= Municipalities of the canton of Basel-Landschaft =

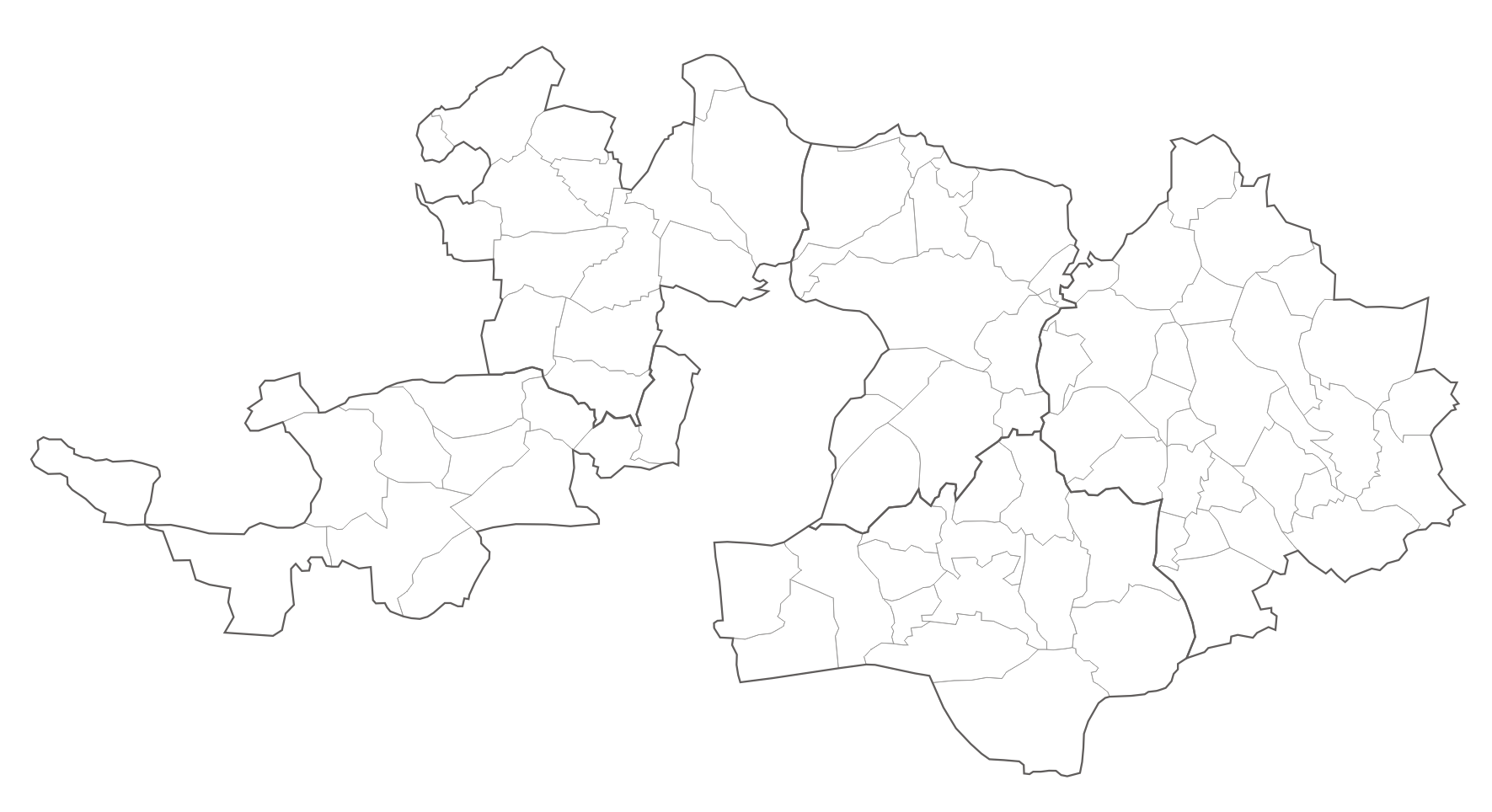
Municipalities in the canton of Basel-Country

The following are the 86 municipalities of the canton of Basel-Country, as of 2009.

== List ==
- Aesch (BL)
- Allschwil
- Anwil
- Arboldswil
- Arisdorf
- Arlesheim
- Augst
- Bennwil
- Biel-Benken
- Binningen
- Birsfelden
- Blauen
- Böckten
- Bottmingen
- Bretzwil
- Brislach
- Bubendorf
- Buckten
- Burg im Leimental
- Buus
- Diegten
- Diepflingen
- Dittingen
- Duggingen
- Eptingen
- Ettingen
- Frenkendorf
- Füllinsdorf
- Gelterkinden
- Giebenach
- Grellingen
- Häfelfingen
- Hemmiken
- Hersberg
- Hölstein
- Itingen
- Känerkinden
- Kilchberg (BL)
- Lampenberg
- Langenbruck
- Läufelfingen
- Laufen
- Lausen
- Lauwil
- Liedertswil
- Liesberg
- Liestal
- Lupsingen
- Maisprach
- Münchenstein
- Muttenz
- Nenzlingen
- Niederdorf
- Nusshof
- Oberdorf (BL)
- Oberwil (BL)
- Oltingen
- Ormalingen
- Pfeffingen
- Pratteln
- Ramlinsburg
- Reigoldswil
- Reinach (BL)
- Rickenbach (BL)
- Roggenburg
- Röschenz
- Rothenfluh
- Rümlingen
- Rünenberg
- Schönenbuch
- Seltisberg
- Sissach
- Tecknau
- Tenniken
- Therwil
- Thürnen
- Titterten
- Wahlen
- Waldenburg
- Wenslingen
- Wintersingen
- Wittinsburg
- Zeglingen
- Ziefen
- Zunzgen
- Zwingen
