= Titterington =

Titterington is a surname. Notable people with the surname include:

- Desmond Titterington (1928–2002), British racing driver from Northern Ireland
- João Titterington Gomes Cravinho (born 1964), Portuguese Minister of Defense (2018-present)
- Meredith Titterington (1886–1949), British Labour Party politician
- Morris M. Titterington (1891–1928), pioneering aviator, and engineer

== See also ==
- Terrington
- Titterten, a municipality in Switzerland
- Titterton, a surname
- Torington
- Wittering (disambiguation)
