= Titterton =

Titterton is a surname. Notable people with the surname include:

- David Titterton (born 1971), British former professional footballer
- Ernest William Titterton Ph. D. (1916–1990), nuclear physicist and professor
- Frank Titterton (1893–1956), well-known British lyric tenor of the mid twentieth century
- George F. Titterton (1904–1998), design engineer and Senior Vice-President of the Grumman Corporation
- Lewis Titterton, American executive
- Maud Titterton (1867–1932), amateur golfer
- Nancy Titterton (1903–1936), American journalist and murder victim
- W. R. Titterton (1876–1963), British journalist, writer and poet, also friend and first biographer of G. K. Chesterton

== See also ==
- Titterten, a municipality in Switzerland
- Titterington, a surname
