= Waldenburg District =

Coordinates: 47°23′N 7°45′E

Waldenburg District Bezirk Waldenburg
- District
- Country: Switzerland
- Canton: Basel-Landschaft
- Capital: Waldenburg

Area
  - Total: 104.93 km^{2} (40.51 sq mi)

Population (2021)
  - Total: 16,118
  - Density: 153.61/km^{2} (397.84/sq mi)
- Time zone: UTC+1 (CET)
  - Summer (DST): UTC+2 (CEST)
- Municipalities: 15

Waldenburg District is one of the five districts of the largely German-speaking canton of Basel-Country in Switzerland. The district lies to the south of Basel-Country, bordering the canton of Solothurn. Its capital is the town of Waldenburg. It has a population of 16,118 (as of 30 June 2021). In average 150 persons live in a square kilometre.

== Geography ==
Waldenburg district has an area, as of 2009, of 104.93 square kilometres (40.51 sq mi). Of this area, 50.72 km^{2} (19.58 sq mi) or 48.3% is used for agricultural purposes, while 46.27 km^{2} (17.86 sq mi) or 44.1% is forested. Of the rest of the land, 7.69 km^{2} (2.97 sq mi) or 7.3% is settled (buildings or roads), 0.21 km^{2} (0.081 sq mi) or 0.2% is either rivers or lakes and 0.07 km^{2} (17 acres) or 0.1% is unproductive land.

Of the built up area, housing and buildings made up 3.9% and transportation infrastructure made up 2.5%. Out of the forested land, 41.8% of the total land area is heavily forested and 2.3% is covered with orchards or small clusters of trees. Of the agricultural land, 10.8% is used for growing crops and 27.5% is pastures, while 3.8% is used for orchards or vine crops and 6.3% is used for alpine pastures. All the water in the municipality is flowing water.

== Municipalities ==
Waldenburg contains a total of fifteen municipalities:

Municipality	Population (30 June 2021)	Area, km^{2}
Arboldswil	580	3.48
Bennwil	673	6.51
Bretzwil	748	7.33
Diegten	1,638	9.64
Eptingen	544	11.19
Hölstein	2,573	6.02
Lampenberg	522	4.00
Langenbruck	958	15.69
Lauwil	307	7.27
Liedertswil	154	1.94
Niederdorf	1,818	4.41
Oberdorf	2,466	6.19
Reigoldswil	1,583	9.25
Titterten	430	3.71
Waldenburg	1,124	8.30
Total	16,118	104.93

== Demographics ==
Waldenburg district has a population (as of June 2021) of 16,118. As of 2008, 13.3% of the population are resident foreign nationals.

Most of the population (as of 2000) speaks German (13,765 or 90.9%), with Italian language being second most common (357 or 2.4%) and Albanian being third (280 or 1.8%). There are 100 people who speak French and 12 people who speak Romansh.

As of 2008, the gender distribution of the population was 50.1% male and 49.9% female. The population was made up of 13,352 Swiss citizens (85.4% of the population), and 2,287 non-Swiss residents (14.6%) Of the population in the district 4,601 or about 30.4% were born in the district and lived there in 2000. There were 4,100 or 27.1% who were born in the same canton, while 3,808 or 25.1% were born somewhere else in Switzerland, and 2,180 or 14.4% were born outside of Switzerland.

In 2008 there were 114 live births to Swiss citizens and 32 births to non-Swiss citizens, and in same time span there were 129 deaths of Swiss citizens and 7 non-Swiss citizen deaths. Ignoring immigration and emigration, the population of Swiss citizens decreased by 15 while the foreign population increased by 25. There were 8 Swiss men and 4 Swiss women who emigrated from Switzerland. At the same time, there were 47 non-Swiss men and 48 non-Swiss women who immigrated from another country to Switzerland. The total Swiss population change in 2008 (from all sources, including moves across municipal borders) was a decrease of 49 and the non-Swiss population change was an increase of 33 people. This represents a population growth rate of -0.1%.

The age distribution, as of 2010, in the district is; 1,044 children or 6.7% of the population are between 0 and 6 years old and 2,581 teenagers or 16.5% are between 7 and 19. Of the adult population, 1,738 people or 11.1% of the population are between 20 and 29 years old. 1,882 people or 12.0% are between 30 and 39, 2,638 people or 16.9% are between 40 and 49, and 3,268 people or 20.9% are between 50 and 64. The senior population distribution is 1,822 people or 11.7% of the population are between 65 and 79 years old and there are 666 people or 4.3% who are over 80.

As of 2000, there were 6,223 people who were single and never married in the municipality. There were 7,489 married individuals, 796 widows or widowers and 635 individuals who are divorced.

There were 1,504 households that consist of only one person and 569 households with five or more people. Out of a total of 5,892 households that answered this question, 25.5% were households made up of just one person and 47 were adults who lived with their parents. Of the rest of the households, there are 1,830 married couples without children, 2,057 married couples with children There were 285 single parents with a child or children. There were 60 households that were made up unrelated people and 109 households that were made some sort of institution or another collective housing.

As of 2000 the average price to rent a two-room apartment was about 726.00 CHF (US$580, £330, €460), a three-room apartment was about 935.00 CHF (US$750, £420, €600) and a four-room apartment cost an average of 1183.00 CHF (US$950, £530, €760).

The historical population is given in the following chart:

== Politics ==
In the 2007 federal election the most popular party was the SVP which received 39.28% of the vote. The next three most popular parties were the SP (20.27%), the FDP (14.58%) and the Green Party (13.65%). In the federal election, a total of 5,408 votes were cast, and the voter turnout was 50.0%.

== Religion ==
From the 2000 census, 2,714 or 17.9% were Roman Catholic, while 8,987 or 59.3% belonged to the Swiss Reformed Church. Of the rest of the population, there were 174 members of an Orthodox church (or about 1.15% of the population), there were 52 individuals (or about 0.34% of the population) who belonged to the Christian Catholic Church, and there were 501 individuals (or about 3.31% of the population) who belonged to another Christian church. There were 7 individuals (or about 0.05% of the population) who were Jewish, and 754 (or about 4.98% of the population) who were Islamic. There were 17 individuals who were Buddhist, 29 individuals who were Hindu and 14 individuals who belonged to another church. 1,419 (or about 9.37% of the population) belonged to no church, are agnostic or atheist, and 475 individuals (or about 3.14% of the population) did not answer the question.

== Education ==
In the district about 5,898 or (38.9%) of the population have completed non-mandatory upper secondary education, and 1,568 or (10.4%) have completed additional higher education (either University or a Fachhochschule). Of the 1,568 who completed tertiary schooling, 67.7% were Swiss men, 22.3% were Swiss women, 6.9% were non-Swiss men and 3.1% were non-Swiss women.
