= Wittering, West Sussex =

Wittering, West Sussex or The Witterings refers to two civil parishes in the Chichester district of West Sussex.

- East Wittering
- West Wittering
- The Witterings (ward), a ward on Chichester District Council

== See also ==
- Wittering (disambiguation)
