= Wittering =

Wittering may refer to:

- Wittering, Cambridgeshire
  - RAF Wittering, near the above
- Wittering, West Sussex, also known as The Witterings, which is divided into:
  - East Wittering
  - West Wittering
- Wittering, a character in the 1958 drama Unman, Wittering and Zigo
