= Lampenberg =

- Municipality
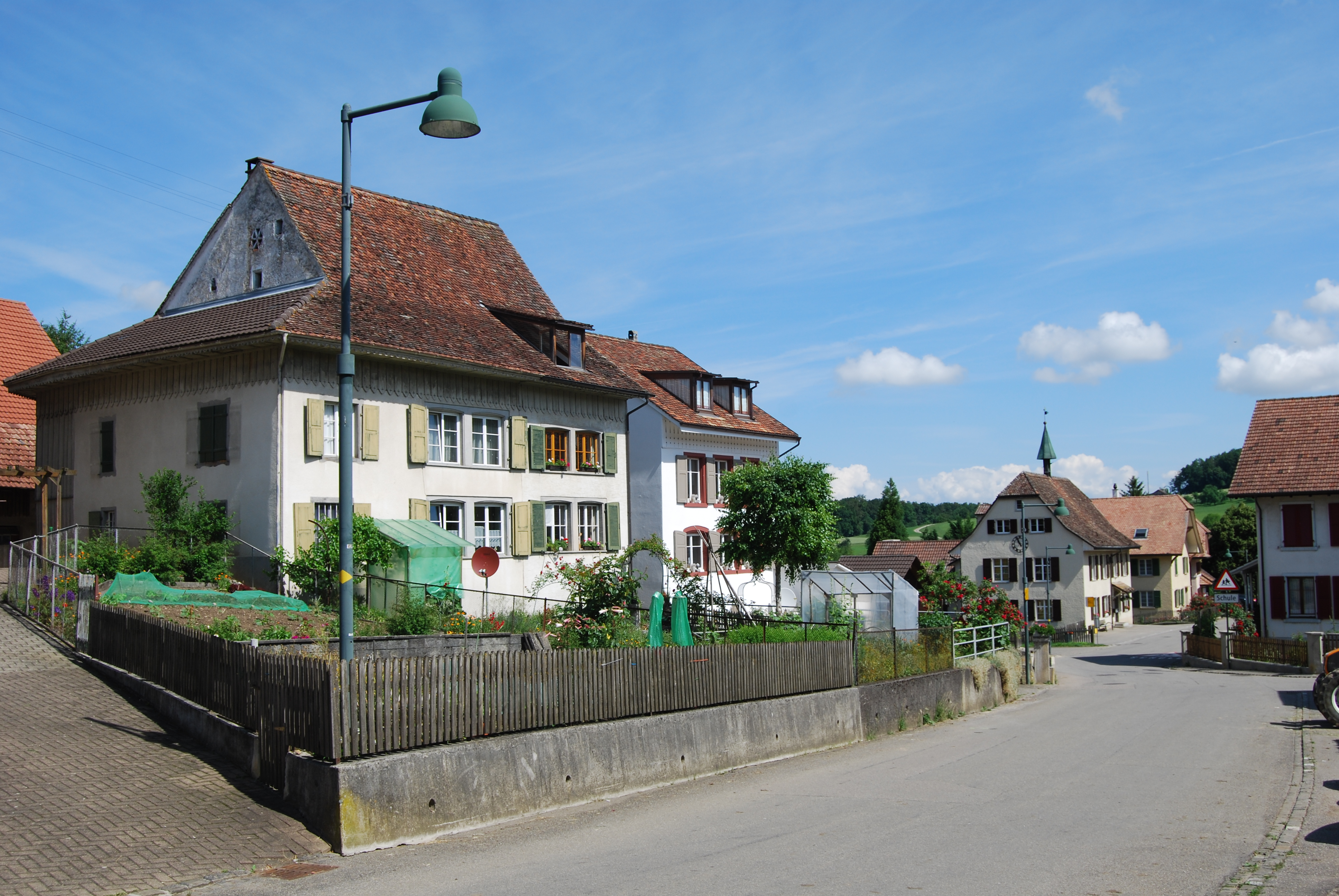

- Coat of arms
- Location of Lampenberg
- Location within Switzerland Location within Canton of Basel-Landschaft
- Coordinates: 47°26′N 7°46′E
- Country: Switzerland
- Canton: Basel-Landschaft
- District: Waldenburg

Area
  - Total: 3.99 km^{2} (1.54 sq mi)
- Elevation: 522 m (1,713 ft)

Population (June 2021)
  - Total: 522
  - Density: 131/km^{2} (339/sq mi)
- Time zone: UTC+01:00 (CET)
  - Summer (DST): UTC+02:00 (CEST)
- Postal code: 4432
- SFOS number: 2887
- ISO 3166 code: CH-BL
- Surrounded by: Bubendorf, Hölstein, Niederdorf
- Website: http://www.lampenberg.ch SFSO statistics

Lampenberg is a municipality in the district of Waldenburg in the canton of Basel-Country in Switzerland.

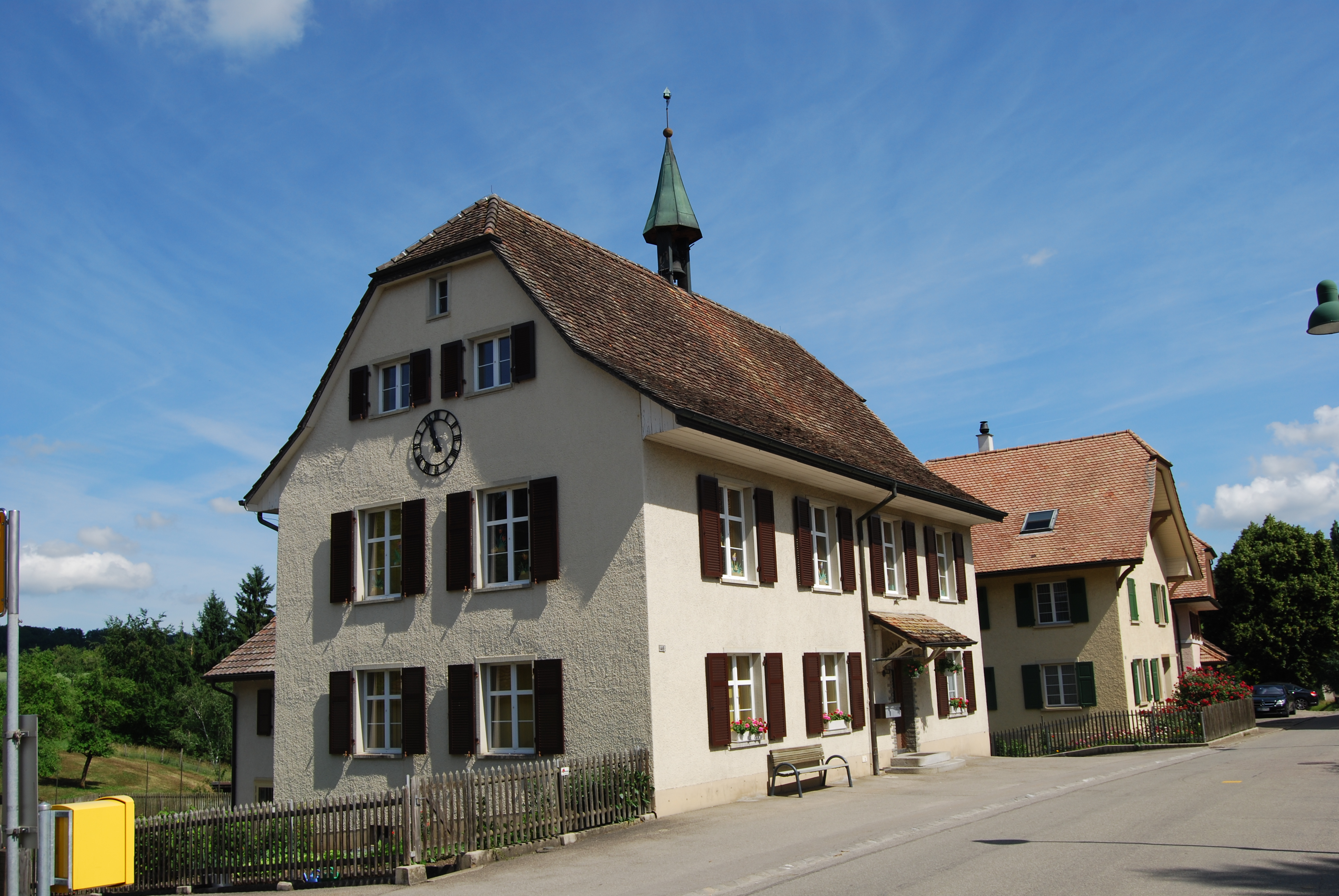
Lampenberg

== History ==
Lampenberg is first mentioned in 1226 as Lampenberc.

== Geography ==
Aerial view from 3000 m by Walter Mittelholzer (1923)

Lampenberg has an area, as of 2009, of 3.99 square kilometers (1.54 sq mi). Of this area, 2.18 km^{2} (0.84 sq mi) or 54.6% is used for agricultural purposes, while 1.56 km^{2} (0.60 sq mi) or 39.1% is forested. Of the rest of the land, 0.29 km^{2} (0.11 sq mi) or 7.3% is settled (buildings or roads).

Of the built up area, housing and buildings made up 4.0% and transportation infrastructure made up 2.8%. Out of the forested land, all of the forested land area is covered with heavy forests. Of the agricultural land, 32.1% is used for growing crops and 16.0% is pastures, while 6.5% is used for orchards or vine crops.

The municipality is located in the Waldenburg district, in a depression between the Vorderen Frenke and Hinteren Frenke valleys gelegene Siedlung district,. It consists of the village of Lampenberg and the hamlets of Bez. Waldenburg, in einer Mulde zwischen den Tälern der Vorderen und Hinteren Frenke gelegene Siedlung..

== Coat of arms ==
The blazon of the municipal coat of arms is Gules, an Arrowpoint Argent.

== Demographics ==
Lampenberg has a population (as of June 2021) of 522. As of 2008, 4.0% of the population are resident foreign nationals. Over the last 10 years (1997–2007) the population has changed at a rate of 10%.

Most of the population (as of 2000) speaks German (427 or 96.8%), with French being second most common (4 or 0.9%) and Turkish being third (3 or 0.7%).

As of 2008, the gender distribution of the population was 48.7% male and 51.3% female. The population was made up of 486 Swiss citizens (95.9% of the population), and 21 non-Swiss residents (4.1%) Of the population in the municipality 168 or about 38.1% were born in Lampenberg and lived there in 2000. There were 129 or 29.3% who were born in the same canton, while 117 or 26.5% were born somewhere else in Switzerland, and 26 or 5.9% were born outside of Switzerland.

In 2008 there were 2 live births to Swiss citizens and 1 birth to non-Swiss citizens, and in same time span there were 8 deaths of Swiss citizens. Ignoring immigration and emigration, the population of Swiss citizens decreased by 6 while the foreign population increased by 1. There were 2 Swiss men who immigrated back to Switzerland. The total Swiss population change in 2008 (from all sources, including moves across municipal borders) was an increase of 1 and the non-Swiss population decreased by 3 people. This represents a population growth rate of -0.4%.

The age distribution, as of 2010, in Lampenberg is; 39 children or 7.7% of the population are between 0 and 6 years old and 69 teenagers or 13.6% are between 7 and 19. Of the adult population, 52 people or 10.3% of the population are between 20 and 29 years old. 57 people or 11.2% are between 30 and 39, 83 people or 16.4% are between 40 and 49, and 120 people or 23.7% are between 50 and 64. The senior population distribution is 67 people or 13.2% of the population are between 65 and 79 years old and there are 20 people or 3.9% who are over 80.

As of 2000, there were 176 people who were single and never married in the municipality. There were 229 married individuals, 23 widows or widowers and 13 individuals who are divorced.

As of 2000, there were 167 private households in the municipality, and an average of 2.6 persons per household. There were 39 households that consist of only one person and 20 households with five or more people. Out of a total of 167 households that answered this question, 23.4% were households made up of just one person and 3 were adults who lived with their parents. Of the rest of the households, there are 54 married couples without children, 61 married couples with children There were 7 single parents with a child or children. There were 3 households that were made up unrelated people.

In 2000, there were 106 single family homes (or 69.3% of the total) out of a total of 153 inhabited buildings. There were 10 multi-family buildings (6.5%), along with 33 multi-purpose buildings that were mostly used for housing (21.6%) and 4 other use buildings (commercial or industrial) that also had some housing (2.6%). Of the single family homes 12 were built before 1919, while 12 were built between 1990 and 2000. The greatest number of single family homes (43) were built between 1971 and 1980.

In 2000, there were 181 apartments in the municipality. The most common apartment size was 5 rooms of which there were 58. There were 5 single room apartments and 101 apartments with five or more rooms. Of these apartments, a total of 164 apartments (90.6% of the total) were permanently occupied, while 7 apartments (3.9%) were seasonally occupied and 10 apartments (5.5%) were empty. As of 2009, the construction rate of new housing units was 5.9 new units per 1000 residents. The vacancy rate for the municipality, in 2010, was 0.48%.

The historical population is given in the following chart:

== Heritage sites of national significance ==
The Neolithic flint tool production site at Stälzer is listed as a Swiss heritage site of national significance.

== Politics ==
In the 2007 federal election the most popular party was the SVP which received 42.58% of the vote. The next three most popular parties were the FDP (15.44%), the SP (14.05%) and the Green Party (12.73%). In the federal election, a total of 238 votes were cast, and the voter turnout was 61.5%.

== Economy ==
As of 2010, Lampenberg had an unemployment rate of 1.8%. As of 2008, there were 42 people employed in the primary economic sector and about 15 businesses involved in this sector. 3 people were employed in the secondary sector and there were 2 businesses in this sector. 24 people were employed in the tertiary sector, with 7 businesses in this sector. There were 221 residents of the municipality who were employed in some capacity, of which females made up 40.7% of the workforce.

In 2008 the total number of full-time equivalent jobs was 41. The number of jobs in the primary sector was 23, all of which were in agriculture. The number of jobs in the secondary sector was 3 of which 2 or (66.7%) were in manufacturing and 1 was in construction. The number of jobs in the tertiary sector was 15. In the tertiary sector; 5 or 33.3% were in a hotel or restaurant, 3 or 20.0% were technical professionals or scientists, 5 or 33.3% were in education.

In 2000, there were 10 workers who commuted into the municipality and 170 workers who commuted away. The municipality is a net exporter of workers, with about 17.0 workers leaving the municipality for every one entering. Of the working population, 21.7% used public transportation to get to work, and 52.9% used a private car.

== Religion ==
From the 2000 census, 71 or 16.1% were Roman Catholic, while 313 or 71.0% belonged to the Swiss Reformed Church. Of the rest of the population, there was 1 member of an Orthodox church who belonged, and there were 21 individuals (or about 4.76% of the population) who belonged to another Christian church. There was 1 individual who belonged to another church. 31 (or about 7.03% of the population) belonged to no church, are agnostic or atheist, and 3 individuals (or about 0.68% of the population) did not answer the question.

== Education ==
In Lampenberg, about 177 or (40.1%) of the population have completed non-mandatory upper secondary education, and 68 or (15.4%) have completed additional higher education (either university or a Fachhochschule). Of the 68 who completed tertiary schooling, 70.6% were Swiss men, 25.0% were Swiss women.

As of 2000, there were 48 students from Lampenberg who attended schools outside the municipality.
