= Bennwil =

- Municipality
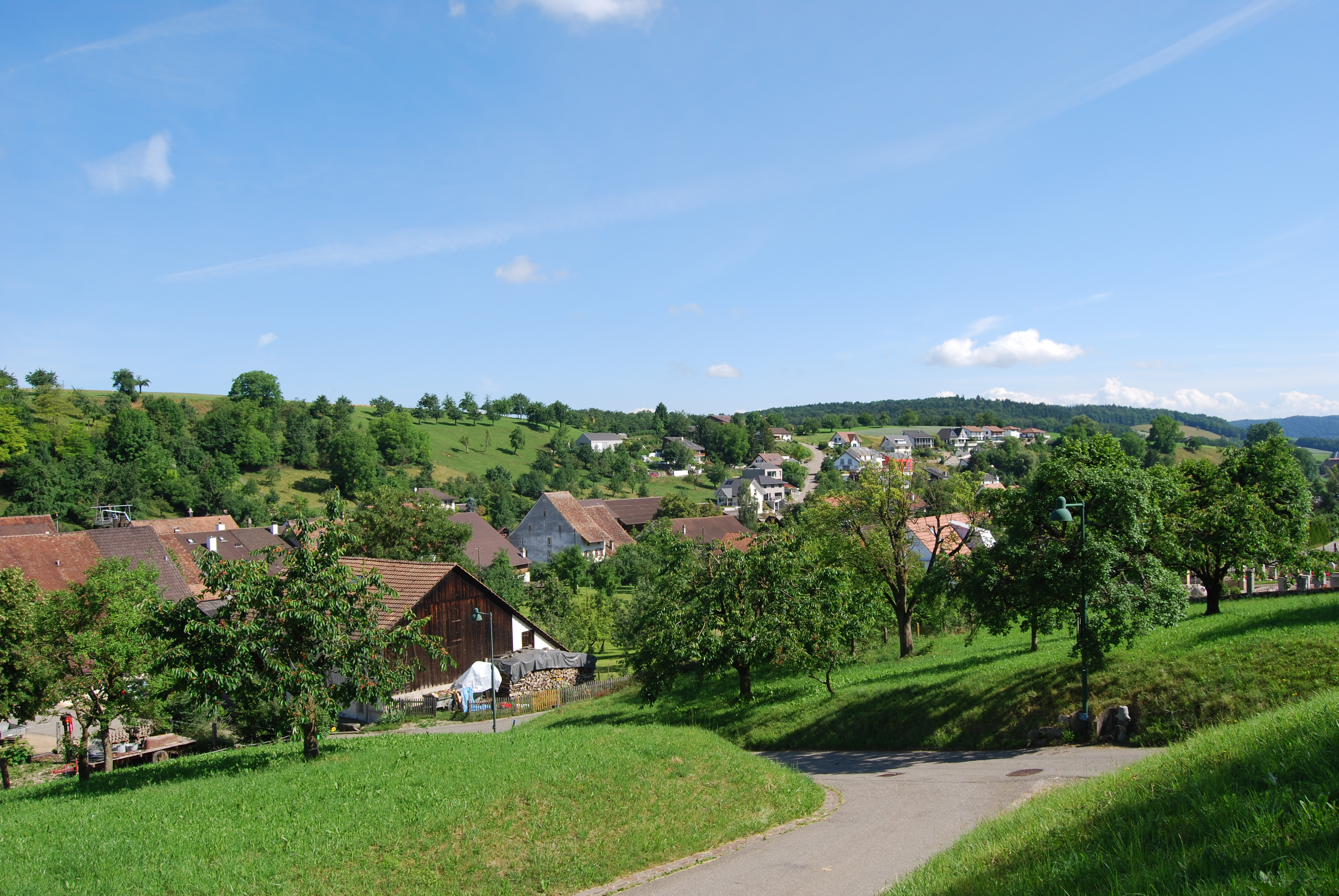

- Flag Coat of arms
- Location of Bennwil
- Location within Switzerland Location within Canton of Basel-Landschaft
- Coordinates: 47°24′N 7°47′E
- Country: Switzerland
- Canton: Basel-Landschaft
- District: Waldenburg

Area
  - Total: 6.51 km^{2} (2.51 sq mi)
- Elevation: 515 m (1,690 ft)

Population (June 2021)
  - Total: 673
  - Density: 103/km^{2} (268/sq mi)
- Time zone: UTC+01:00 (CET)
  - Summer (DST): UTC+02:00 (CEST)
- Postal code: 4431
- SFOS number: 2882
- ISO 3166 code: CH-BL
- Surrounded by: Diegten, Eptingen, Hölstein, Langenbruck, Niederdorf, Oberdorf
- Website: http://www.bennwil.ch SFSO statistics

Bennwil is a municipality in the district of Waldenburg in the canton of Basel-Country in Switzerland.

== History ==
Bennwil is first mentioned in 1218 as Bendewilere. A mention of the village that claimed to be from 1189 is believed to be a fake.

== Geography ==
Aerial view (1953)

Bennwil has an area, as of 2009, of 6.51 square kilometers (2.51 sq mi). Of this area, 3.47 km^{2} (1.34 sq mi) or 53.3% is used for agricultural purposes, while 2.66 km^{2} (1.03 sq mi) or 40.9% is forested. Of the rest of the land, 0.36 km^{2} (0.14 sq mi) or 5.5% is settled (buildings or roads), 0.03 km^{2} (7.4 acres) or 0.5% is either rivers or lakes.

Of the built up area, housing and buildings made up 3.7% and transportation infrastructure made up 1.1%. Out of the forested land, 37.8% of the total land area is heavily forested and 3.1% is covered with orchards or small clusters of trees. Of the agricultural land, 18.0% is used for growing crops and 28.4% is pastures, while 5.2% is used for orchards or vine crops and 1.7% is used for alpine pastures. All the water in the municipality is flowing water.

The municipality is located in the Waldenburg district, in the Bennwilerbach or Walibach valley. It consists of the linear village of Bennwil and about 24 individual farm houses.

== Coat of arms ==
The blazon of the municipal coat of arms is Azure, a Paschal lamb Argent, hoofed and haloed Or, holding a flag Argent a Cross Gules.

== Demographics ==
Bennwil has a population (as of June 2021) of 673. As of 2008, 4.4% of the population are resident foreign nationals. Over the last 10 years (1997–2007) the population has changed at a rate of 2.5%.

Most of the population (as of 2000) speaks German (580 or 96.2%), with Serbo-Croatian being second most common (9 or 1.5%) and English being third (6 or 1.0%). There are 3 people who speak French.

As of 2008, the gender distribution of the population was 53.2% male and 46.8% female. The population was made up of 597 Swiss citizens (94.2% of the population), and 37 non-Swiss residents (5.8%) Of the population in the municipality 237 or about 39.3% were born in Bennwil and lived there in 2000. There were 179 or 29.7% who were born in the same canton, while 139 or 23.1% were born somewhere else in Switzerland, and 37 or 6.1% were born outside of Switzerland.

In 2008 there were 6 live births to Swiss citizens and were 6 deaths of Swiss citizens. Ignoring immigration and emigration, the population of Swiss citizens remained the same while the foreign population remained the same. The total Swiss population change in 2008 (from all sources, including moves across municipal borders) was a decrease of 5 and the non-Swiss population decreased by 6 people. This represents a population growth rate of -1.8%.

The age distribution, as of 2010, in Bennwil is; 67 children or 10.6% of the population are between 0 and 6 years old and 86 teenagers or 13.6% are between 7 and 19. Of the adult population, 68 people or 10.7% of the population are between 20 and 29 years old. 94 people or 14.8% are between 30 and 39, 100 people or 15.8% are between 40 and 49, and 138 people or 21.8% are between 50 and 64. The senior population distribution is 57 people or 9.0% of the population are between 65 and 79 years old and there are 24 people or 3.8% who are over 80.

As of 2000, there were 267 people who were single and never married in the municipality. There were 297 married individuals, 17 widows or widowers and 22 individuals who are divorced.

As of 2000, there were 215 private households in the municipality, and an average of 2.7 persons per household. There were 43 households that consist of only one person and 26 households with five or more people. Out of a total of 218 households that answered this question, 19.7% were households made up of just one person and 1 were adults who lived with their parents. Of the rest of the households, there are 72 married couples without children, 92 married couples with children There were 5 single parents with a child or children. There were 2 households that were made up unrelated people and 3 households that were made some sort of institution or another collective housing.

In 2000 there were 114 single family homes (or 63.3% of the total) out of a total of 180 inhabited buildings. There were 25 multi-family buildings (13.9%), along with 34 multi-purpose buildings that were mostly used for housing (18.9%) and 7 other use buildings (commercial or industrial) that also had some housing (3.9%). Of the single family homes 27 were built before 1919, while 17 were built between 1990 and 2000.

In 2000 there were 230 apartments in the municipality. The most common apartment size was 4 rooms of which there were 73. There were 1 single room apartments and 97 apartments with five or more rooms. Of these apartments, a total of 208 apartments (90.4% of the total) were permanently occupied, while 18 apartments (7.8%) were seasonally occupied and 4 apartments (1.7%) were empty. As of 2009, the construction rate of new housing units was 8 new units per 1000 residents. As of 2000 the average price to rent a three-room apartment was about 1280.00 CHF (US$1020, £580, €820) and a four-room apartment cost an average of 1429.00 CHF (US$1140, £640, €910). The vacancy rate for the municipality, in 2010, was 0.78%.

The historical population is given in the following chart:

== Heritage sites of national significance ==
The Neolithic settlement at Ötschberg is listed as a Swiss heritage site of national significance. The entire village of Bennwil is part of the Inventory of Swiss Heritage Sites.

== Politics ==
In the 2007 federal election the most popular party was the SVP which received 47.27% of the vote. The next three most popular parties were the Green Party (15.94%), the FDP (15.58%) and the SP (11.7%). In the federal election, a total of 240 votes were cast, and the voter turnout was 52.1%.

== Economy ==
As of 2010, Bennwil had an unemployment rate of 2.6%. As of 2008, there were 65 people employed in the primary economic sector and about 23 businesses involved in this sector. 82 people were employed in the secondary sector and there were 9 businesses in this sector. 34 people were employed in the tertiary sector, with 12 businesses in this sector. There were 331 residents of the municipality who were employed in some capacity, of which females made up 42.0% of the workforce.

In 2008 the total number of full-time equivalent jobs was 142. The number of jobs in the primary sector was 44, of which 36 were in agriculture and 8 were in forestry or lumber production. The number of jobs in the secondary sector was 76, of which 63 or (82.9%) were in manufacturing and 13 (17.1%) were in construction. The number of jobs in the tertiary sector was 22. In the tertiary sector; 1 or 4.5% were in wholesale or retail sales or the repair of motor vehicles, 3 or 13.6% were in a hotel or restaurant, 2 or 9.1% were in the information industry, 3 or 13.6% were technical professionals or scientists, 5 or 22.7% were in education.

In 2000, there were 89 workers who commuted into the municipality and 243 workers who commuted away. The municipality is a net exporter of workers, with about 2.7 workers leaving the municipality for every one entering. About 7.9% of the workforce coming into Bennwil are coming from outside Switzerland. Of the working population, 13.6% used public transportation to get to work, and 62.2% used a private car.

== Religion ==
From the 2000 census, 69 or 11.4% were Roman Catholic, while 441 or 73.1% belonged to the Swiss Reformed Church. Of the rest of the population, there were 9 members of an Orthodox church (or about 1.49% of the population), there were 2 individuals (or about 0.33% of the population) who belonged to the Christian Catholic Church, and there were 16 individuals (or about 2.65% of the population) who belonged to another Christian church. 52 (or about 8.62% of the population) belonged to no church, are agnostic or atheist, and 14 individuals (or about 2.32% of the population) did not answer the question.

== Education ==
In Bennwil about 236 or (39.1%) of the population have completed non-mandatory upper secondary education, and 77 or (12.8%) have completed additional higher education (either university or a Fachhochschule). Of the 77 who completed tertiary schooling, 64.9% were Swiss men, 26.0% were Swiss women.

As of 2000, there were 60 students from Bennwil who attended schools outside the municipality.
