= Liedertswil =

- Municipality
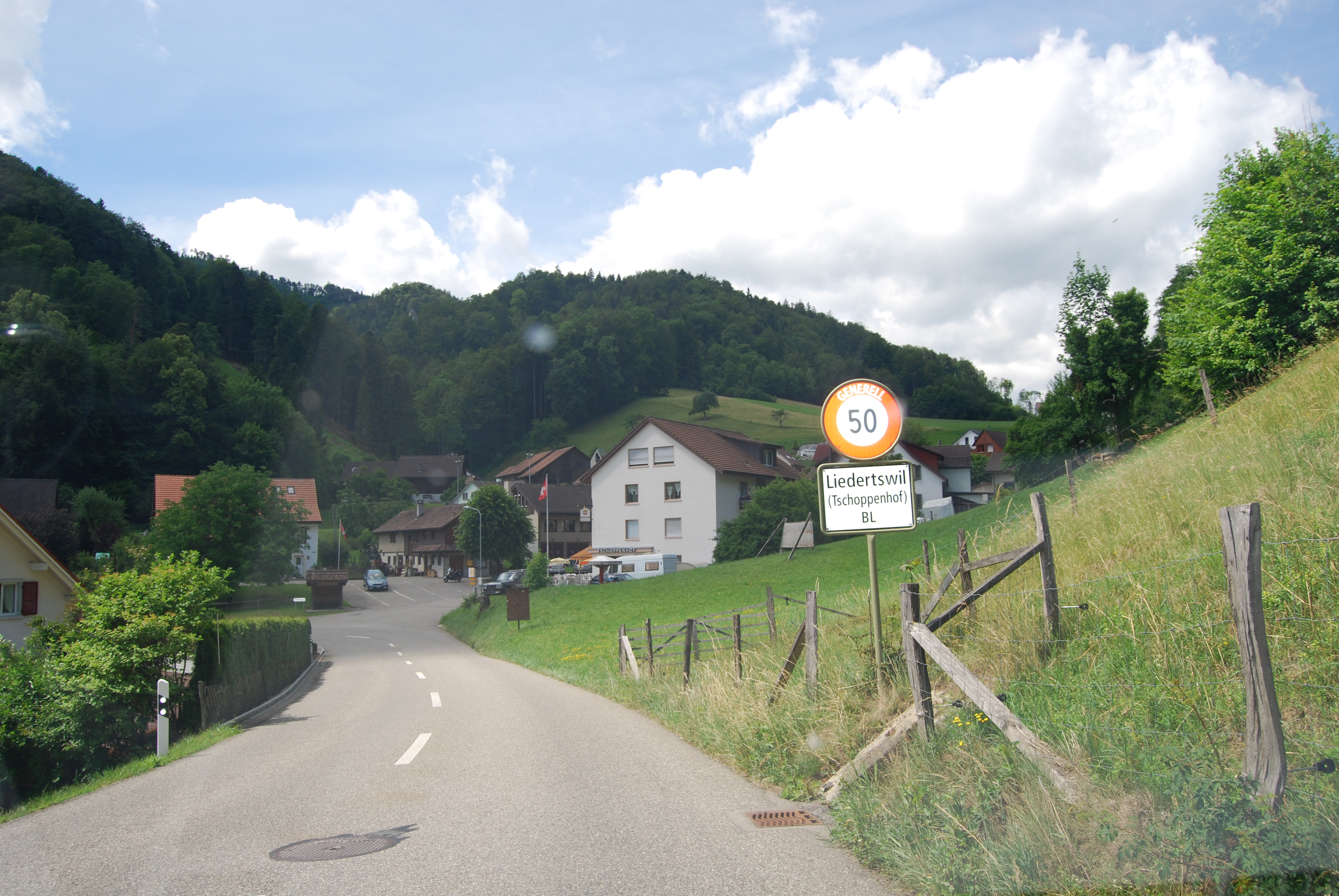

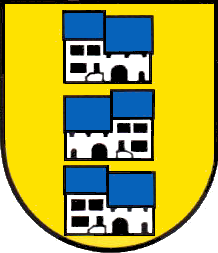
- Coat of arms
- Location of Liedertswil
- Location within Switzerland Location within Canton of Basel-Landschaft
- Coordinates: 47°24′N 7°43′E
- Country: Switzerland
- Canton: Basel-Landschaft
- District: Waldenburg

Area
  - Total: 1.94 km^{2} (0.75 sq mi)
- Elevation: 629 m (2,064 ft)

Population (June 2021)
  - Total: 154
  - Density: 79.4/km^{2} (206/sq mi)
- Time zone: UTC+01:00 (CET)
  - Summer (DST): UTC+02:00 (CEST)
- Postal code: 4436
- SFOS number: 2890
- ISO 3166 code: CH-BL
- Surrounded by: Oberdorf, Reigoldswil, Titterten, Waldenburg
- Website: www.liedertswil.ch

Liedertswil (Swiss German: Tschoppehof) is a municipality in the district of Waldenburg in the canton of Basel-Country in Switzerland.

== History ==
Liedertswil is first mentioned in 1194 as Liedirwilre.

== Geography ==
Liedertswil has an area, as of 2009, of 1.94 square kilometers (0.75 sq mi). Of this area, 0.72 km^{2} (0.28 sq mi) or 37.1% is used for agricultural purposes, while 1.13 km^{2} (0.44 sq mi) or 58.2% is forested. Of the rest of the land, 0.1 km^{2} (25 acres) or 5.2% is settled (buildings or roads).

Of the built up area, housing and buildings made up 2.1% and transportation infrastructure made up 3.1%. Out of the forested land, 53.1% of the total land area is heavily forested and 5.2% is covered with orchards or small clusters of trees. Of the agricultural land, 2.1% is used for growing crops and 24.7% is pastures and 9.3% is used for alpine pastures.

The municipality is located in the Waldenburg district, at the entrance to the Waldenburger valley into the Reigoldswiler valley.

== Coat of arms ==
The blazon of the municipal coat of arms is Or, three Houses in pale Argent roofed Azure doored and windowed Sable.

== Demographics ==
Liedertswil has a population (as of June 2021) of 154. As of 2008, 2.6% of the population are resident foreign nationals. Over the last 10 years (1997–2007) the population has changed at a rate of 5.9%.

Most of the population (as of 2000) speaks German (148 or 98.0%) with the rest speaking French

As of 2008, the gender distribution of the population was 52.5% male and 47.5% female. The population was made up of 151 Swiss citizens (93.2% of the population), and 11 non-Swiss residents (6.8%) Of the population in the municipality 35 or about 23.2% were born in Liedertswil and lived there in 2000. There were 38 or 25.2% who were born in the same canton, while 60 or 39.7% were born somewhere else in Switzerland, and 8 or 5.3% were born outside of Switzerland.

In 2008, the total Swiss population change in 2008 (from all sources, including moves across municipal borders) was an increase of 1 and the non-Swiss population decreased by 1 people. This represents a population growth rate of 0.0%.

The age distribution, as of 2010, in Liedertswil is; 9 children or 5.6% of the population are between 0 and 6 years old and 23 teenagers or 14.2% are between 7 and 19. Of the adult population, 11 people or 6.8% of the population are between 20 and 29 years old. 20 people or 12.3% are between 30 and 39, 31 people or 19.1% are between 40 and 49, and 38 people or 23.5% are between 50 and 64. The senior population distribution is 24 people or 14.8% of the population are between 65 and 79 years old and there are 6 people or 3.7% who are over 80.

As of 2000, there were 60 people who were single and never married in the municipality. There were 84 married individuals, 2 widows or widowers and 5 individuals who are divorced.

As of 2000, there were 63 private households in the municipality, and an average of 2.4 persons per household. There were 18 households that consist of only one person and 3 households with five or more people. Out of a total of 65 households that answered this question, 27.7% were households made up of just one person. Of the rest of the households, there are 19 married couples without children, 22 married couples with children There were 4 single parents with a child or children.

In 2000 there were 28 single-family homes (or 60.9% of the total) out of a total of 46 inhabited buildings. There were 7 multi-family buildings (15.2%), along with 8 multi-purpose buildings that were mostly used for housing (17.4%) and 3 other use buildings (commercial or industrial) that also had some housing (6.5%). Of the single-family homes 6 were built before 1919, while 6 were built between 1990 and 2000. The greatest number of single-family homes (7) were built between 1981 and 1990.

In 2000 there were 64 apartments in the municipality. The most common apartment size was 4 rooms of which there were 22. There were 1 single room apartments and 29 apartments with five or more rooms. Of these apartments, a total of 61 apartments (95.3% of the total) were permanently occupied, while 3 apartments (4.7%) were seasonally occupied. As of 2009, the construction rate of new housing units was 12.4 new units per 1000 residents. The vacancy rate for the municipality, in 2010, was 0%.

The historical population is given in the following chart:

== Politics ==
In the 2007 federal election the most popular party was the SVP which received 46.72% of the vote. The next three most popular parties were the SP (22.13%), the FDP (12.62%) and the Green Party (11.31%). In the federal election, a total of 89 votes were cast, and the voter turnout was 71.8%.

== Economy ==
As of 2010, Liedertswil had an unemployment rate of 2.1%. As of 2008, there were 8 people employed in the primary economic sector and about 4 businesses involved in this sector. 51 people were employed in the secondary sector and there were 2 businesses in this sector. 16 people were employed in the tertiary sector, with 5 businesses in this sector. There were 105 residents of the municipality who were employed in some capacity, of which females made up 42.9% of the workforce.

In 2008 the total number of full-time equivalent jobs was 69. The number of jobs in the primary sector was 5, all of which were in agriculture. The number of jobs in the secondary sector was 50 of which 49 or (98.0%) were in manufacturing and 1 was in construction. The number of jobs in the tertiary sector was 14. In the tertiary sector; 13 or 92.9% were in the movement and storage of goods, 1 was in a hotel or restaurant, 1 was a technical professional or scientist.

In 2000, there were 43 workers who commuted into the municipality and 73 workers who commuted away. The municipality is a net exporter of workers, with about 1.7 workers leaving the municipality for every one entering. Of the working population, 9.5% used public transportation to get to work, and 65.7% used a private car.

== Religion ==
From the 2000 census, 14 or 9.3% were Roman Catholic, while 113 or 74.8% belonged to the Swiss Reformed Church. There was 1 individual who was Islamic. There was 1 person who was Buddhist. 18 (or about 11.92% of the population) belonged to no church, are agnostic or atheist, and 4 individuals (or about 2.65% of the population) did not answer the question.

== Education ==
In Liedertswil about 81 or (53.6%) of the population have completed non-mandatory upper secondary education, and 13 or (8.6%) have completed additional higher education (either university or a Fachhochschule). Of the 13 who completed tertiary schooling, 61.5% were Swiss men, 30.8% were Swiss women.

As of 2000, there were 3 students in Liedertswil who came from another municipality, while 16 residents attended schools outside the municipality.
