= Niederdorf, Basel-Landschaft =

Niederdorf
- Municipality
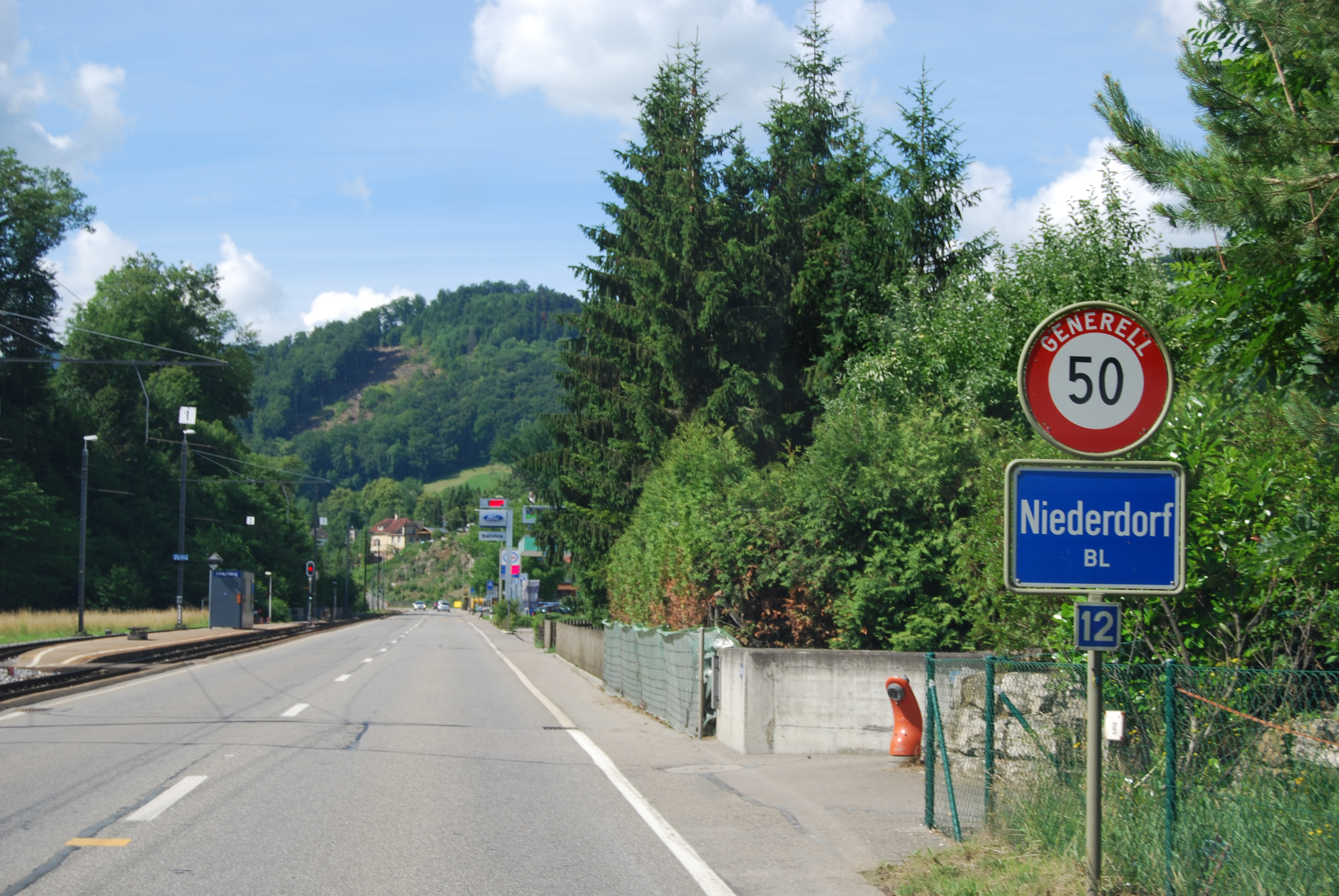

- Coat of arms
- Location of Niederdorf
- Location within Switzerland Location within Canton of Basel-Landschaft
- Coordinates: 47°24′N 7°45′E
- Country: Switzerland
- Canton: Basel-Landschaft
- District: Waldenburg

Area
  - Total: 4.41 km^{2} (1.70 sq mi)
- Elevation: 465 m (1,526 ft)

Population (December 2005)
  - Total: 1,778
  - Density: 403/km^{2} (1,040/sq mi)
- Time zone: UTC+01:00 (CET)
  - Summer (DST): UTC+02:00 (CEST)
- Postal code: 4435
- SFOS number: 2891
- ISO 3166 code: CH-BL
- Surrounded by: Arboldswil, Bennwil, Bubendorf, Hölstein, Lampenberg, Oberdorf, Titterten
- Website: www.niederdorf.ch

Niederdorf is a municipality in the district of Waldenburg in the canton of Basel-Landschaft in Switzerland.

== History ==
Niederdorf is first mentioned around 1345-89 as Onoltzwil in dem [...] nidern dorff. In 1453 it was mentioned as Niderndorff. Like Oberdorf it was part of the village of Onoldswil, until that village was dissolved in the 13th Century.

== Geography ==
Aerial view (1953)

Niederdorf has an area, as of 2009, of 4.41 square kilometers (1.70 sq mi). Of this area, 2.57 km^{2} (0.99 sq mi) or 58.3% is used for agricultural purposes, while 1.17 km^{2} (0.45 sq mi) or 26.5% is forested. Of the rest of the land, 0.66 km^{2} (0.25 sq mi) or 15.0% is settled (buildings or roads), 0.01 km^{2} (2.5 acres) or 0.2% is either rivers or lakes and 0.01 km^{2} (2.5 acres) or 0.2% is unproductive land.

Of the built up area, industrial buildings made up 1.8% of the total area while housing and buildings made up 8.8% and transportation infrastructure made up 4.1%. Out of the forested land, 24.7% of the total land area is heavily forested and 1.8% is covered with orchards or small clusters of trees. Of the agricultural land, 27.2% is used for growing crops and 25.4% is pastures, while 5.7% is used for orchards or vine crops. All the water in the municipality is flowing water.

The municipality is located in the Waldenburg district, in the Waldenburger and Vorderen Frenken valleys on the old road over the Oberen Hauenstein Pass. It consists of the village of Niederdorf along with 14 scattered farming settlements (from the 19th Century) and the former church-owned farm of Arxhof (established in 1585, acquired by the Canton in 1960).

== Coat of arms ==
The blazon of the municipal coat of arms is Per bend Argent and Gules, overall a Key palewise counterchanged.

== Demographics ==
Niederdorf has a population (as of June 2021) of 1,818. As of 2008, 20.9% of the population are resident foreign nationals. Over the last 10 years (1997–2007) the population has changed at a rate of 0%.

Most of the population (as of 2000) speaks German (1,640 or 84.8%), with Italian language being second most common (105 or 5.4%) and Serbo-Croatian being third (62 or 3.2%). There are 11 people who speak French and 3 people who speak Romansh.

As of 2008, the gender distribution of the population was 50.0% male and 50.0% female. The population was made up of 1,380 Swiss citizens (76.6% of the population), and 421 non-Swiss residents (23.4%) Of the population in the municipality 465 or about 24.1% were born in Niederdorf and lived there in 2000. There were 544 or 28.1% who were born in the same canton, while 442 or 22.9% were born somewhere else in Switzerland, and 378 or 19.6% were born outside of Switzerland.

In 2008 there were 9 live births to Swiss citizens and 5 births to non-Swiss citizens, and in same time span there were 15 deaths of Swiss citizens and 1 non-Swiss citizen death. Ignoring immigration and emigration, the population of Swiss citizens decreased by 6 while the foreign population increased by 4. There were 3 Swiss men and 1 Swiss woman who emigrated from Switzerland. At the same time, there were 4 non-Swiss men and 6 non-Swiss women who immigrated from another country to Switzerland. The total Swiss population change in 2008 (from all sources, including moves across municipal borders) was a decrease of 7 and the non-Swiss population decreased by 9 people. This represents a population growth rate of -0.9%.

The age distribution, as of 2010, in Niederdorf is; 114 children or 6.3% of the population are between 0 and 6 years old and 303 teenagers or 16.8% are between 7 and 19. Of the adult population, 193 people or 10.7% of the population are between 20 and 29 years old. 203 people or 11.3% are between 30 and 39, 266 people or 14.8% are between 40 and 49, and 419 people or 23.3% are between 50 and 64. The senior population distribution is 230 people or 12.8% of the population are between 65 and 79 years old and there are 73 people or 4.1% who are over 80.

As of 2000, there were 791 people who were single and never married in the municipality. There were 943 married individuals, 112 widows or widowers and 87 individuals who are divorced.

As of 2000 the average number of residents per living room was 0.58 which is about equal to the cantonal average of 0.56 per room. In this case, a room is defined as space of a housing unit of at least 4 m^{2} (43 sq ft) as normal bedrooms, dining rooms, living rooms, kitchens and habitable cellars and attics. About 57% of the total households were owner occupied, or in other words did not pay rent (though they may have a mortgage or a rent-to-own agreement).

As of 2000, there were 696 private households in the municipality, and an average of 2.5 persons per household. There were 175 households that consist of only one person and 54 households with five or more people. Out of a total of 713 households that answered this question, 24.5% were households made up of just one person and 3 were adults who lived with their parents. Of the rest of the households, there are 229 married couples without children, 256 married couples with children There were 29 single parents with a child or children. There were 4 households that were made up unrelated people and 17 households that were made some sort of institution or another collective housing.

In 2000 there were 291 single family homes (or 68.1% of the total) out of a total of 427 inhabited buildings. There were 73 multi-family buildings (17.1%), along with 45 multi-purpose buildings that were mostly used for housing (10.5%) and 18 other use buildings (commercial or industrial) that also had some housing (4.2%). Of the single family homes 16 were built before 1919, while 54 were built between 1990 and 2000. The greatest number of single family homes (60) were built between 1946 and 1960.

In 2000 there were 703 apartments in the municipality. The most common apartment size was 4 rooms of which there were 217. There were 11 single room apartments and 271 apartments with five or more rooms. Of these apartments, a total of 658 apartments (93.6% of the total) were permanently occupied, while 21 apartments (3.0%) were seasonally occupied and 24 apartments (3.4%) were empty. As of 2009, the construction rate of new housing units was 1.7 new units per 1000 residents. As of 2000 the average price to rent a two-room apartment was about 684.00 CHF (US$550, £310, €440), a three-room apartment was about 905.00 CHF (US$720, £410, €580) and a four-room apartment cost an average of 1055.00 CHF (US$840, £470, €680). The vacancy rate for the municipality, in 2010, was 0.54%.

The historical population is given in the following chart:

== Politics ==
In the 2007 federal election the most popular party was the SVP which received 40.15% of the vote. The next three most popular parties were the FDP (20.66%), the SP (16.25%) and the Green Party (11.06%). In the federal election, a total of 570 votes were cast, and the voter turnout was 49.1%.

== Economy ==
As of 2010, Niederdorf had an unemployment rate of 3.7%. As of 2008, there were 40 people employed in the primary economic sector and about 12 businesses involved in this sector. 170 people were employed in the secondary sector and there were 24 businesses in this sector. 506 people were employed in the tertiary sector, with 55 businesses in this sector. There were 995 residents of the municipality who were employed in some capacity, of which females made up 40.8% of the workforce.

In 2008 the total number of full-time equivalent jobs was 571. The number of jobs in the primary sector was 29, of which23 were in agriculture and 5 were in forestry or lumber production. The number of jobs in the secondary sector was 155 of which 122 or (78.7%) were in manufacturing and 33 (21.3%) were in construction. The number of jobs in the tertiary sector was 387. In the tertiary sector; 85 or 22.0% were in wholesale or retail sales or the repair of motor vehicles, 6 or 1.6% were in the movement and storage of goods, 6 or 1.6% were in a hotel or restaurant, 12 or 3.1% were in the information industry, 1 was the insurance or financial industry, 21 or 5.4% were technical professionals or scientists, 35 or 9.0% were in education and 135 or 34.9% were in health care.

In 2000, there were 512 workers who commuted into the municipality and 676 workers who commuted away. The municipality is a net exporter of workers, with about 1.3 workers leaving the municipality for every one entering. About 7.0% of the workforce coming into Niederdorf are coming from outside Switzerland. Of the working population, 24% used public transportation to get to work, and 46.7% used a private car.

== Religion ==
From the 2000 census, 464 or 24.0% were Roman Catholic, while 976 or 50.5% belonged to the Swiss Reformed Church. Of the rest of the population, there were 40 members of an Orthodox church (or about 2.07% of the population), there were 8 individuals (or about 0.41% of the population) who belonged to the Christian Catholic Church, and there were 43 individuals (or about 2.22% of the population) who belonged to another Christian church. There were 113 (or about 5.85% of the population) who were Islamic. There were 3 individuals who were Buddhist, 2 individuals who were Hindu and 1 individual who belonged to another church. 172 (or about 8.90% of the population) belonged to no church, are agnostic or atheist, and 111 individuals (or about 5.74% of the population) did not answer the question.

== Education ==
In Niederdorf about 673 or (34.8%) of the population have completed non-mandatory upper secondary education, and 188 or (9.7%) have completed additional higher education (either university or a Fachhochschule). Of the 188 who completed tertiary schooling, 73.9% were Swiss men, 19.1% were Swiss women, 6.4% were non-Swiss men.

As of 2000, there were 53 students in Niederdorf who came from another municipality, while 130 residents attended schools outside the municipality.

== Transport ==
Niederdorf is served by the Waldenburg narrow gauge railway, which operates a quarter-hourly train service to Liestal. At Liestal railway station, onward connection is made with the Swiss Federal Railway's services to Basel, Bern, Lucerne and Zürich.
