= Arboldswil =

- Municipality
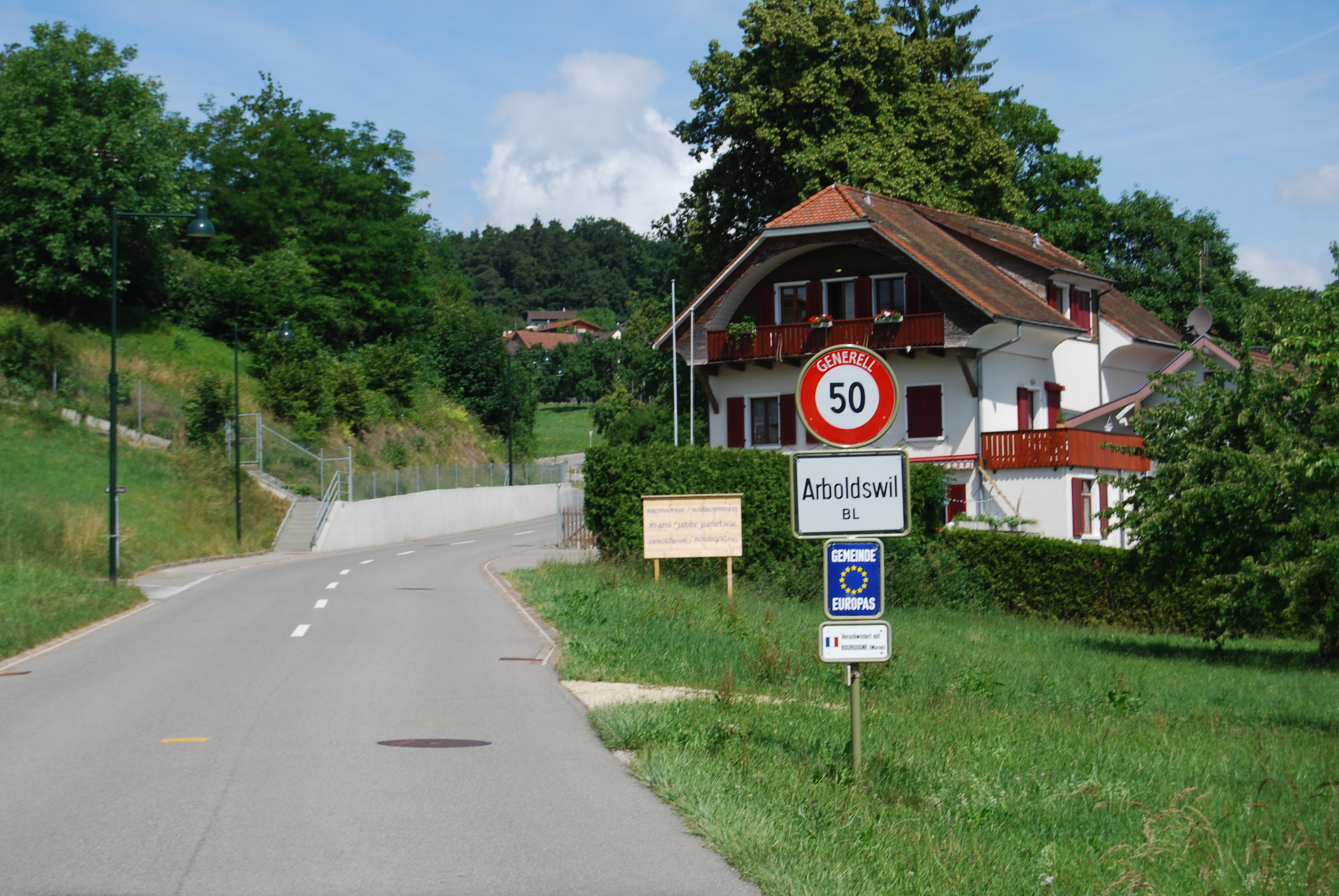

- Coat of arms
- Location of Arboldswil
- Location within Switzerland Location within Canton of Basel-Landschaft
- Coordinates: 47°25′N 7°43′E
- Country: Switzerland
- Canton: Basel-Landschaft
- District: Waldenburg

Area
  - Total: 3.48 km^{2} (1.34 sq mi)
- Elevation: 630 m (2,070 ft)

Population (June 2021)
  - Total: 580
  - Density: 170/km^{2} (430/sq mi)
- Time zone: UTC+01:00 (CET)
  - Summer (DST): UTC+02:00 (CEST)
- Postal code: 4424
- SFOS number: 2881
- ISO 3166 code: CH-BL
- Surrounded by: Bubendorf, Niederdorf, Reigoldswil, Titterten, Ziefen
- Website: www.arboldswil.ch

Arboldswil is a municipality in the district of Waldenburg in the canton of Basel-Country in Switzerland.

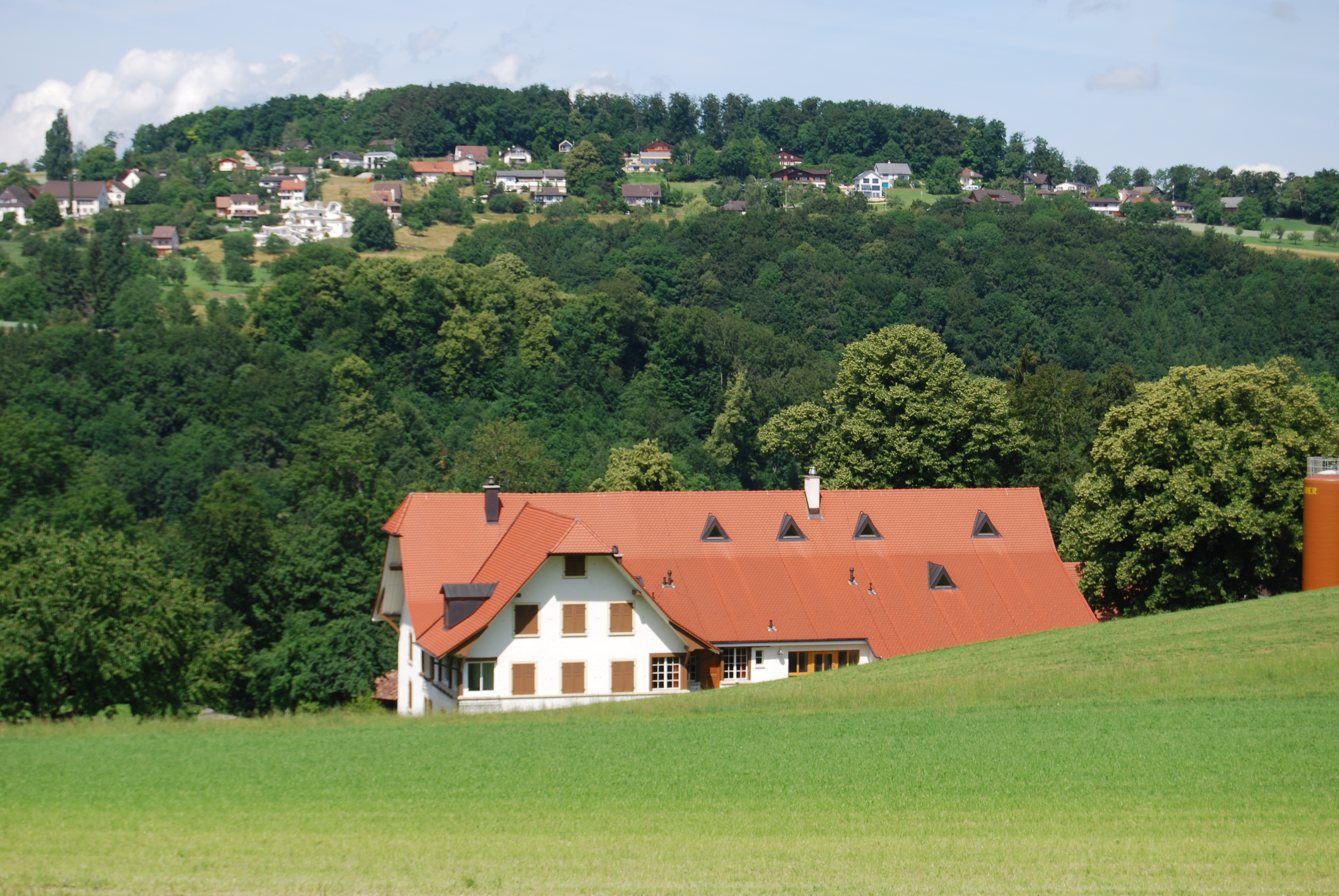
Arboldswil

== History ==
Arboldswil is first mentioned in 1226 as Arboldswilre.

== Geography ==
Aerial view (1953)

Arboldswil has an area, as of 2009, of 3.48 square kilometers (1.34 sq mi). Of this area, 1.78 km^{2} (0.69 sq mi) or 51.1% is used for agricultural purposes, while 1.44 km^{2} (0.56 sq mi) or 41.4% is forested. Of the rest of the land, 0.22 km^{2} (0.085 sq mi) or 6.3% is settled (buildings or roads).

Of the built up area, housing and buildings made up 3.4% and transportation infrastructure made up 2.6%. Out of the forested land, 39.4% of the total land area is heavily forested and 2.0% is covered with orchards or small clusters of trees. Of the agricultural land, 9.8% is used for growing crops and 32.5% is pastures, while 8.9% is used for orchards or vine crops.

The municipality is located in the Waldenburg district, on a plateau in the Jura Mountains between the Waldenburger and Reigoldswiler valleys.

== Coat of arms ==
The blazon of the municipal coat of arms is Azure, a tower embattled argent masoned sable issuant from a mount of three coupeaux vert, in chief the sun in its splendour or.

== Demographics ==
Arboldswil has a population (as of June 2021) of 580. As of 2008, 4.6% of the population are resident foreign nationals. Over the last 10 years (1997–2007) the population has changed at a rate of 5.3%.

Most of the population (as of 2000) speaks German (454 or 92.1%), with Portuguese being second most common (16 or 3.2%) and French being third (5 or 1.0%).

As of 2008, the gender distribution of the population was 50.5% male and 49.5% female. The population was made up of 494 Swiss citizens (94.5% of the population), and 29 non-Swiss residents (5.5%) Of the population in the municipality 187 or about 37.9% were born in Arboldswil and lived there in 2000. There were 143 or 29.0% who were born in the same canton, while 91 or 18.5% were born somewhere else in Switzerland, and 67 or 13.6% were born outside of Switzerland.

In 2008 there were 8 live births to Swiss citizens and were 2 deaths of Swiss citizens. Ignoring immigration and emigration, the population of Swiss citizens increased by 6 while the foreign population remained the same. There were 2 non-Swiss women who immigrated from another country to Switzerland. The total Swiss population change in 2008 (from all sources, including moves across municipal borders) was an increase of 7 and the non-Swiss population increased by 5 people. This represents a population growth rate of 2.3%.

The age distribution, as of 2010, in Arboldswil is; 45 children or 8.6% of the population are between 0 and 6 years old and 78 teenagers or 14.9% are between 7 and 19. Of the adult population, 38 people or 7.3% of the population are between 20 and 29 years old. 72 people or 13.8% are between 30 and 39, 92 people or 17.6% are between 40 and 49, and 115 people or 22.0% are between 50 and 64. The senior population distribution is 64 people or 12.2% of the population are between 65 and 79 years old and there are 19 people or 3.6% who are over 80.

As of 2000, there were 186 people who were single and never married in the municipality. There were 261 married individuals, 21 widows or widowers and 25 individuals who are divorced.

As of 2000, there were 192 private households in the municipality, and an average of 2.6 persons per household. There were 44 households that consist of only one person and 16 households with five or more people. Out of a total of 194 households that answered this question, 22.7% were households made up of just one person and 2 were adults who lived with their parents. Of the rest of the households, there are 64 married couples without children, 72 married couples with children There were 10 single parents with a child or children.

In 2000 there were 113 single-family homes (or 70.2% of the total) out of a total of 161 inhabited buildings. There were 18 multi-family buildings (11.2%), along with 24 multi-purpose buildings that were mostly used for housing (14.9%) and 6 other use buildings (commercial or industrial) that also had some housing (3.7%). Of the single-family homes 19 were built before 1919, while 27 were built between 1990 and 2000. The greatest number of single-family homes (20) were built between 1961 and 1970.

In 2000 there were 199 apartments in the municipality. The most common apartment size was 5 rooms of which there were 61. There were 5 single-room apartments and 89 apartments with five or more rooms. Of these apartments, a total of 183 apartments (92.0% of the total) were permanently occupied, while 9 apartments (4.5%) were seasonally occupied and 7 apartments (3.5%) were empty. As of 2009, the construction rate of new housing units was 5.8 new units per 1000 residents. As of 2000 the average price to rent a two-room apartment was about .00 CHF (US$0, £0, €0), a three-room apartment was about 892.00 CHF (US$710, £400, €570) and a four-room apartment cost an average of 1108.00 CHF (US$890, £500, €710). The vacancy rate for the municipality, in 2010, was 0%.

The historical population is given in the following chart:

== Politics ==
In the 2007 federal election the most popular party was the SVP which received 43.31% of the vote. The next three most popular parties were the SP (16.81%), the FDP (13.63%) and the Green Party (11.56%). In the federal election, a total of 229 votes were cast, and the voter turnout was 59.8%.

== Economy ==
As of 2010, Arboldswil had an unemployment rate of 1%. As of 2008, there were 16 people employed in the primary economic sector and about 9 businesses involved in this sector. 12 people were employed in the secondary sector and there were 3 businesses in this sector. 49 people were employed in the tertiary sector, with 11 businesses in this sector. There were 261 residents of the municipality who were employed in some capacity, of which females made up 41.0% of the workforce.

In 2008 the total number of full-time equivalent jobs was 52. The number of jobs in the primary sector was 9, all of which were in agriculture. The number of jobs in the secondary sector was 6, of which 5 or (83.3%) were in manufacturing and 1 (16.7%) were in construction. The number of jobs in the tertiary sector was 37. In the tertiary sector; 2 or 5.4% were in wholesale or retail sales or the repair of motor vehicles, 1 or 2.7% were in a hotel or restaurant, 1 or 2.7% were the insurance or financial industry, 25 or 67.6% were technical professionals or scientists, 6 or 16.2% were in education.

In 2000, there were 29 workers who commuted into the municipality and 204 workers who commuted away. The municipality is a net exporter of workers, with about 7.0 workers leaving the municipality for every one entering. Of the working population, 26.8% used public transportation to get to work, and 51.3% used a private car.

== Religion ==
From the 2000 census, 48 or 9.7% were Roman Catholic, while 340 or 69.0% belonged to the Swiss Reformed Church. Of the rest of the population, there were 2 individuals (or about 0.41% of the population) who belonged to the Christian Catholic Church, and there were 29 individuals (or about 5.88% of the population) who belonged to another Christian church. There were 10 (or about 2.03% of the population) who were Islamic. There were 3 individuals who were Buddhist, 5 individuals who were Hindu and 1 individual who belonged to another church. 38 (or about 7.71% of the population) belonged to no church, are agnostic or atheist, and 17 individuals (or about 3.45% of the population) did not answer the question.

== Education ==
In Arboldswil about 220 or (44.6%) of the population have completed non-mandatory upper secondary education, and 49 or (9.9%) have completed additional higher education (either university or a Fachhochschule). Of the 49 who completed tertiary schooling, 65.3% were Swiss men, 26.5% were Swiss women.

As of 2000, there were 14 students in Arboldswil who came from another municipality, while 55 residents attended schools outside the municipality.
