= Lauwil =

- Municipality
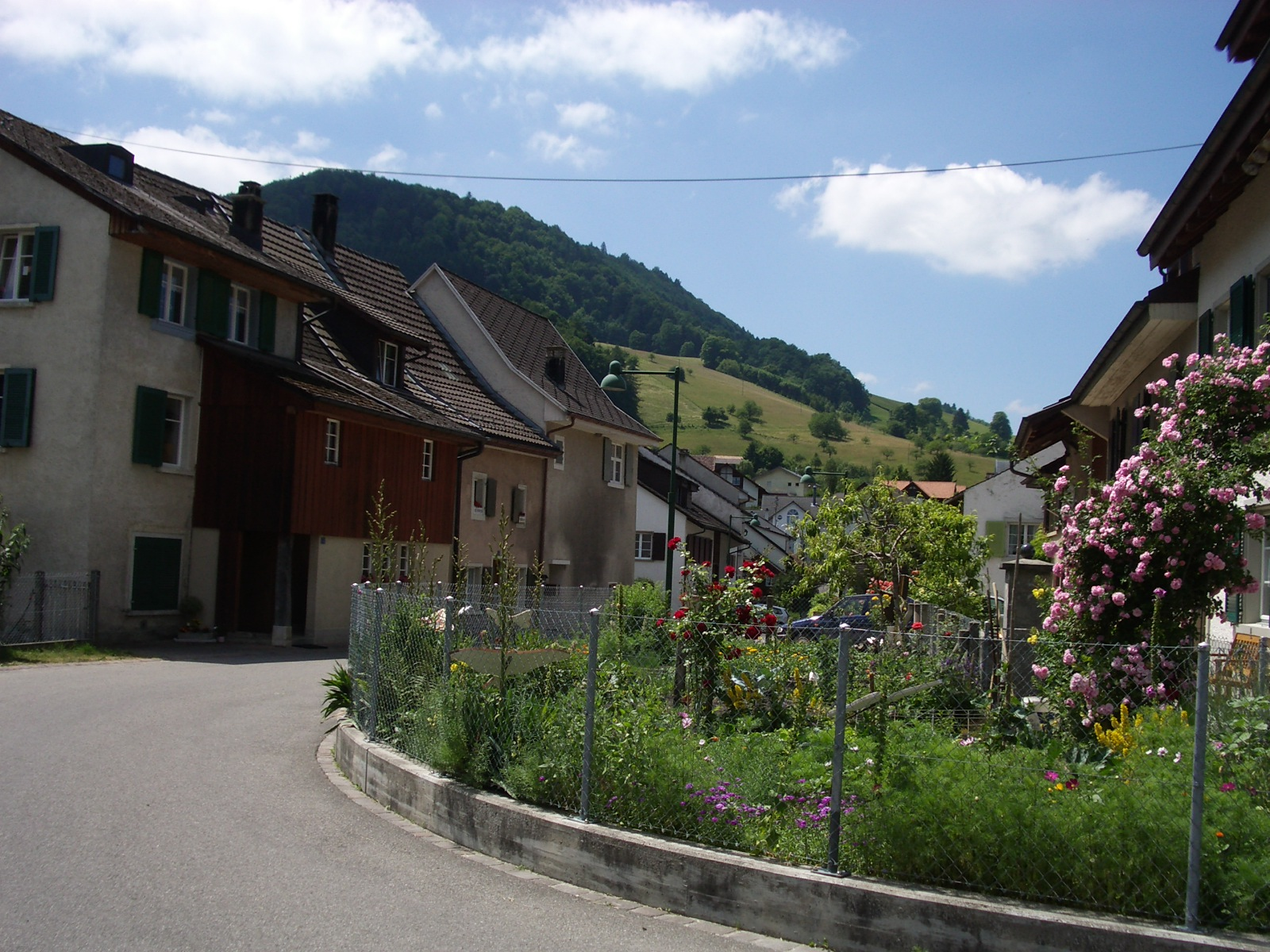

- Coat of arms
- Location of Lauwil
- Location within Switzerland Location within Canton of Basel-Landschaft
- Coordinates: 47°23′N 7°41′E
- Country: Switzerland
- Canton: Basel-Landschaft
- District: Waldenburg

Area
  - Total: 7.27 km^{2} (2.81 sq mi)
- Elevation: 633 m (2,077 ft)

Population (June 2021)
  - Total: 307
  - Density: 42.2/km^{2} (109/sq mi)
- Time zone: UTC+01:00 (CET)
  - Summer (DST): UTC+02:00 (CEST)
- Postal code: 4426
- SFOS number: 2889
- ISO 3166 code: CH-BL
- Surrounded by: Beinwil (SO), Bretzwil, Mümliswil-Ramiswil (SO), Nunningen (SO), Reigoldswil
- Website: www.lauwil.ch

Lauwil is a municipality in the district of Waldenburg in the canton of Basel-Country in Switzerland.

== History ==
Lauwil is first mentioned in 1194 as Luiwilre.

== Geography ==
Aerial view (1953)

Lauwil has an area, as of 2009, of 7.27 square kilometers (2.81 sq mi). Of this area, 3.47 km^{2} (1.34 sq mi) or 47.7% is used for agricultural purposes, while 3.6 km^{2} (1.4 sq mi) or 49.5% is forested. Of the rest of the land, 0.18 km^{2} (0.069 sq mi) or 2.5% is settled (buildings or roads), 0.02 km^{2} (4.9 acres) or 0.3% is either rivers or lakes.

Of the built up area, housing and buildings made up 1.7% and transportation infrastructure made up 0.7%. Out of the forested land, 46.4% of the total land area is heavily forested and 3.2% is covered with orchards or small clusters of trees. Of the agricultural land, 0.8% is used for growing crops and 25.6% is pastures, while 2.8% is used for orchards or vine crops and 18.6% is used for alpine pastures. All of the water in the municipality is flowing water.

The municipality is located in the Waldenburg district, in a depression in the Jura Mountains at an elevation of 637 m (2,090 ft). It consists of the village of Lauwil and the hamlets of Bez.

== Coat of arms ==
The blazon of the municipal coat of arms is Argent, Coupeaux Vert incensed Gules.

== Demographics ==
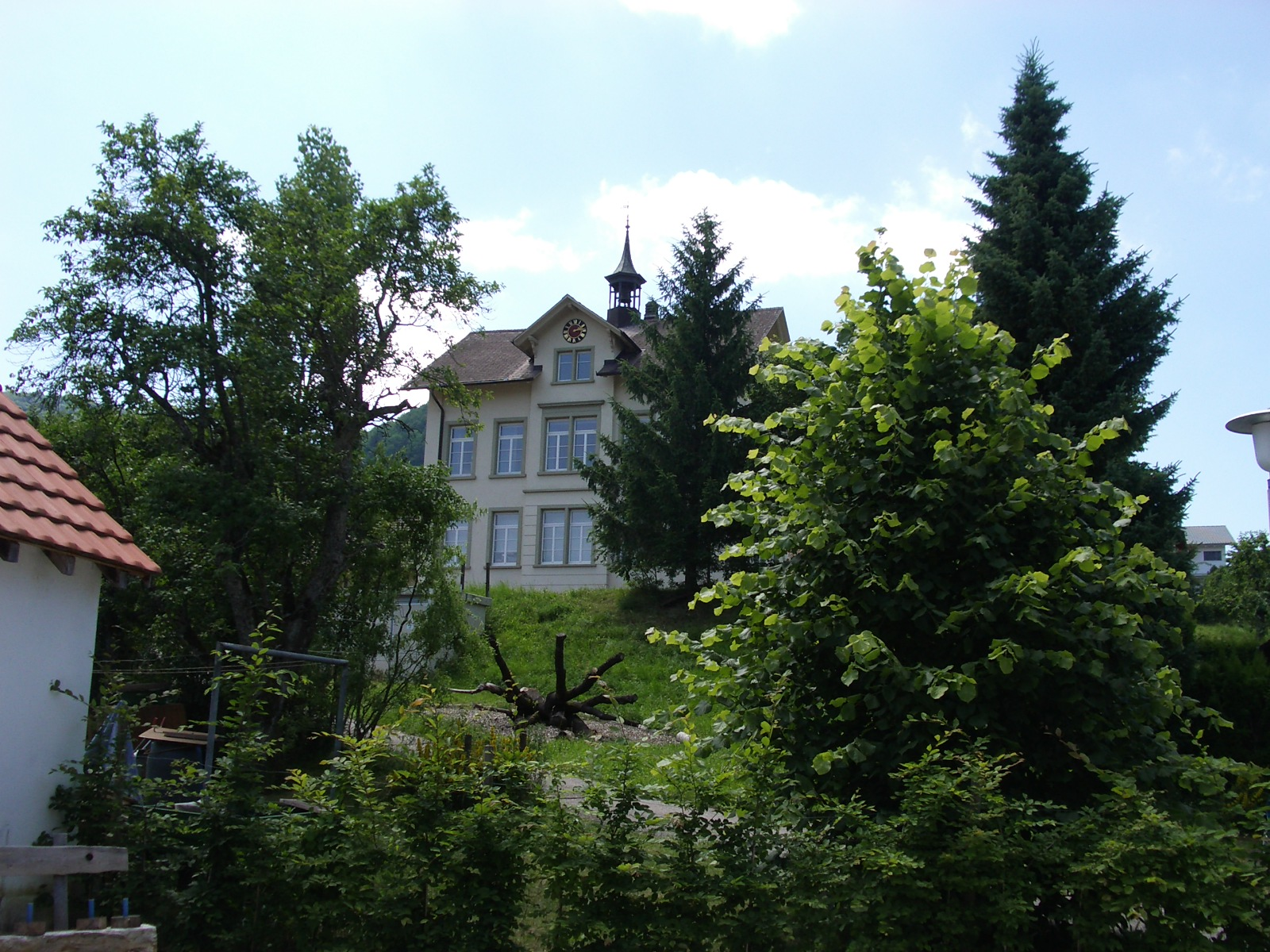
Lauwil

Lauwil has a population (as of June 2021) of 307. As of 2008, 6.2% of the population are resident foreign nationals. Over the last 10 years (1997–2007), the population has changed at a rate of 6.8%.

Most of the population (as of 2000) speaks German (305 or 99.3%), with Italian being second most common (1 or 0.3%) and Polish being third (1 or 0.3%).

As of 2008, the gender distribution of the population was 46.8% male and 53.2% female. The population was made up of 309 Swiss citizens (93.4% of the population), and 22 non-Swiss residents (6.6%) Of the population in the municipality, 109 (or about 35.5%) were born in Lauwil and lived there in 2000. There were 86 or 28.0% who were born in the same canton, while 79 or 25.7% were born somewhere else in Switzerland, and 23 or 7.5% were born outside of Switzerland.

In 2008, there were 4 live births to Swiss citizens and there were 2 deaths of Swiss citizens. Ignoring immigration and emigration, the population of Swiss citizens increased by 2 while the foreign population remained the same. At the same time, there was 1 non-Swiss woman who immigrated from another country to Switzerland. The total Swiss population change in 2008 (from all sources, including moves across municipal borders) was an increase of 6 and the non-Swiss population increased by 5 people. This represents a population growth rate of 3.4%.

The age distribution, as of 2010, in Lauwil is, 27 children (or 8.2% of the population) are between 0 and 6 years old and 48 teenagers (or 14.5%) are between 7 and 19. Of the adult population, 19 people (or 5.7% of the population) are between 20 and 29 years old. 52 people (or 15.7%) are between 30 and 39, 59 people (or 17.8%) are between 40 and 49, and 57 people (or 17.2%) are between 50 and 64. The senior population distribution is 46 people (or 13.9% of the population) between 65 and 79 years old and 23 people (or 6.9%) who are over 80.

As of 2000, there were 120 people who were single and never married in the municipality. There were 150 married individuals, 17 widows or widowers, and 20 individuals who were divorced.

As of 2000, there were 124 private households in the municipality, and an average of 2.5 persons per household. There were 34 households that consist of only one person and 10 households with five or more people. Out of a total of 125 households that answered this question, 27.2% were households made up of just one person and 1 were adults who lived with their parents. Of the rest of the households, there were 34 married couples without children, 44 married couples with children There were 8 single parents with a child or children. There were 3 households that were made up unrelated people and 1 household that was some sort of institution or another collective housing.

In 2000, there were 77 single family homes (or 64.2% of the total) out of a total of 120 inhabited buildings. There were 11 multi-family buildings (9.2%), along with 23 multi-purpose buildings that were mostly used for housing (19.2%), and 9 other use buildings (commercial or industrial) that also had some housing (7.5%). Of the single family homes, 27 were built before 1919, while 12 were built between 1990 and 2000.

In 2000, there were 156 apartments in the municipality. The most common apartment size was 4 rooms, of which there were 35. There were 3 single room apartments and 62 apartments with five or more rooms. Of these apartments, a total of 121 apartments (77.6% of the total) were permanently occupied, while 24 apartments (15.4%) were seasonally occupied, and 11 apartments (7.1%) were empty. As of 2009, the construction rate of new housing units was 0 new units per 1000 residents. The vacancy rate for the municipality, in 2010, was 0%.

The historical population is given in the following chart:

== Politics ==
In the 2007 federal election, the most popular party was the SVP which received 34.18% of the vote. The next three most popular parties were the SP (21.71%), the Green Party (17.78%), and the FDP (11.78%). In the federal election, a total of 125 votes were cast, and the voter turnout was 48.8%.

== Economy ==
As of 2010, Lauwil had an unemployment rate of 0.6%. As of 2008, there were 26 people employed in the primary economic sector and about 11 businesses involved in this sector. 37 people were employed in the secondary sector and there were 5 businesses in this sector. 23 people were employed in the tertiary sector, with 7 businesses in this sector. There were 148 residents of the municipality who were employed in some capacity, of which females made up 39.9% of the workforce.

In 2008, the total number of full-time equivalent jobs was 65. The number of jobs in the primary sector was 18, all of which were in agriculture. The number of jobs in the secondary sector was 35, of which 2 (5.7%) were in manufacturing and 32 (91.4%) were in construction. The number of jobs in the tertiary sector was 12. In the tertiary sector, 2 (16.7%) were in wholesale or retail sales or the repair of motor vehicles, 2 (16.7%) were in a hotel or restaurant, 1 was in the information industry, 1 was a technical professional or scientist, and 5 (41.7%) were in education.

In 2000, there were 23 workers who commuted into the municipality and 104 workers who commuted away. The municipality is a net exporter of workers, with about 4.5 workers leaving the municipality for every one entering. Of the working population, 23% used public transportation to get to work and 47.3% used a private car.

== Religion ==
From the 2000 census, 44 or 14.3% were Roman Catholic, while 211 or 68.7% belonged to the Swiss Reformed Church. Of the rest of the population, there were 7 individuals (or about 2.28% of the population) who belonged to another Christian church. There were 4 (or about 1.30% of the population) who were Islamic. 32 (or about 10.42% of the population) belonged to no church – they were agnostic or atheist – and 9 individuals (or about 2.93% of the population) did not answer the question.

== Education ==
In Lauwil, about 125 (40.7% of the population) have completed non-mandatory upper secondary education, and 28 or (9.1%) have completed additional higher education (either university or a Fachhochschule). Of the 28 who completed tertiary schooling, 71.4% were Swiss men and 21.4% were Swiss women.

As of 2000, there was one student in Lauwil who came from another municipality, while 18 residents attended schools outside the municipality.
