= Reigoldswil =

- Municipality
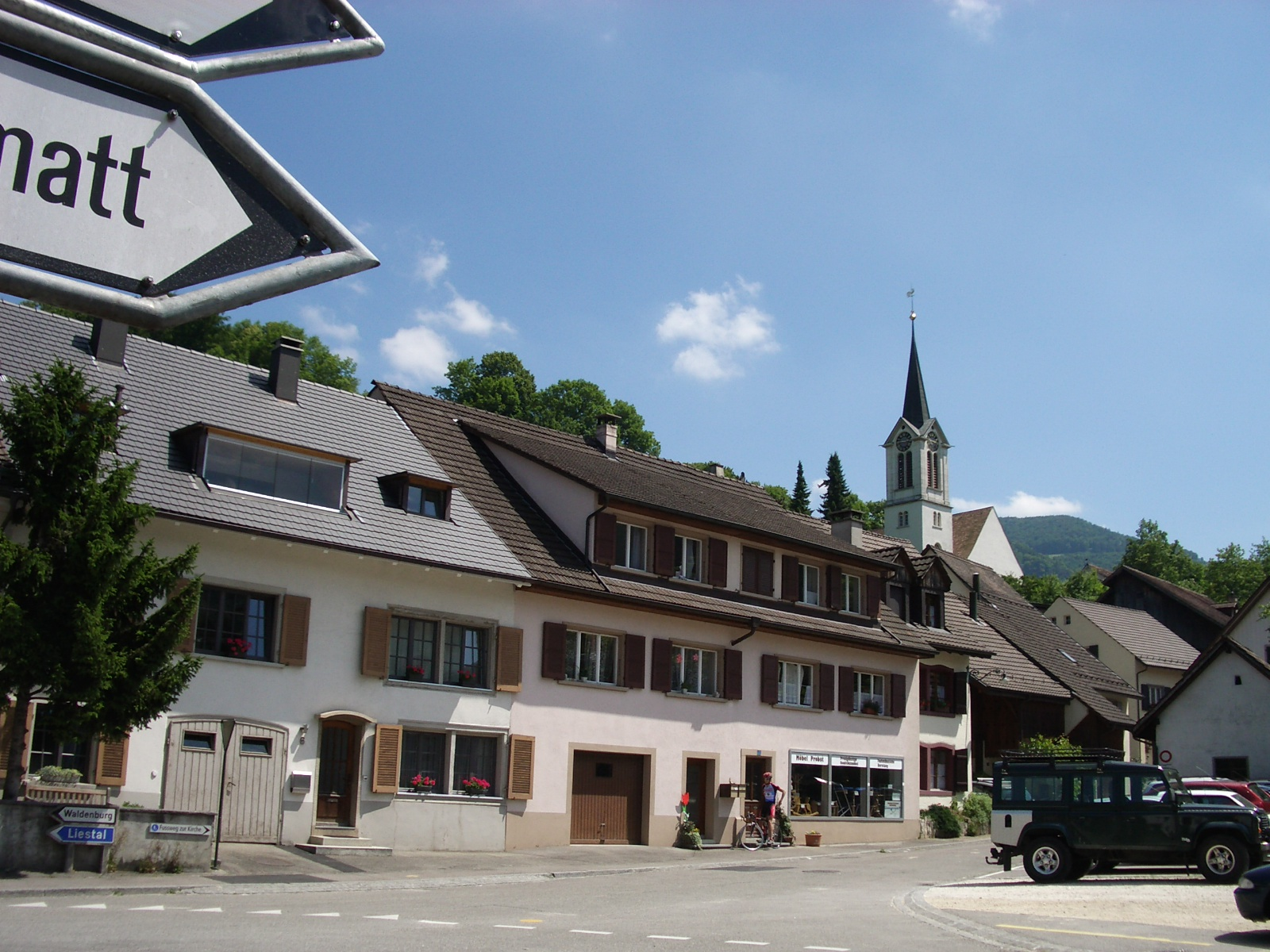

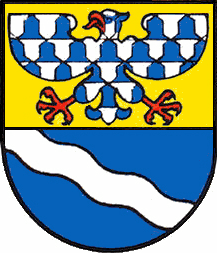
- Coat of arms
- Location of Reigoldswil
- Location within Switzerland Location within Canton of Basel-Landschaft
- Coordinates: 47°24′N 7°41′E
- Country: Switzerland
- Canton: Basel-Landschaft
- District: Waldenburg

Area
  - Total: 9.25 km^{2} (3.57 sq mi)
- Elevation: 509 m (1,670 ft)

Population (June 2021)
  - Total: 1,583
  - Density: 171/km^{2} (443/sq mi)
- Time zone: UTC+01:00 (CET)
  - Summer (DST): UTC+02:00 (CEST)
- Postal code: 4418
- SFOS number: 2893
- ISO 3166 code: CH-BL
- Surrounded by: Arboldswil, Bretzwil, Lauwil, Liedertswil, Mümliswil-Ramiswil (SO), Seewen (SO), Titterten, Waldenburg, Ziefen
- Twin towns: Bad Bellingen (Germany)
- Website: www.reigoldswil.ch

Reigoldswil is a municipality in the district of Waldenburg in the canton of Basel-Country in Switzerland.

== History ==
Reigoldswil is first mentioned in 1152 as Rigoltswilre.

== Geography ==
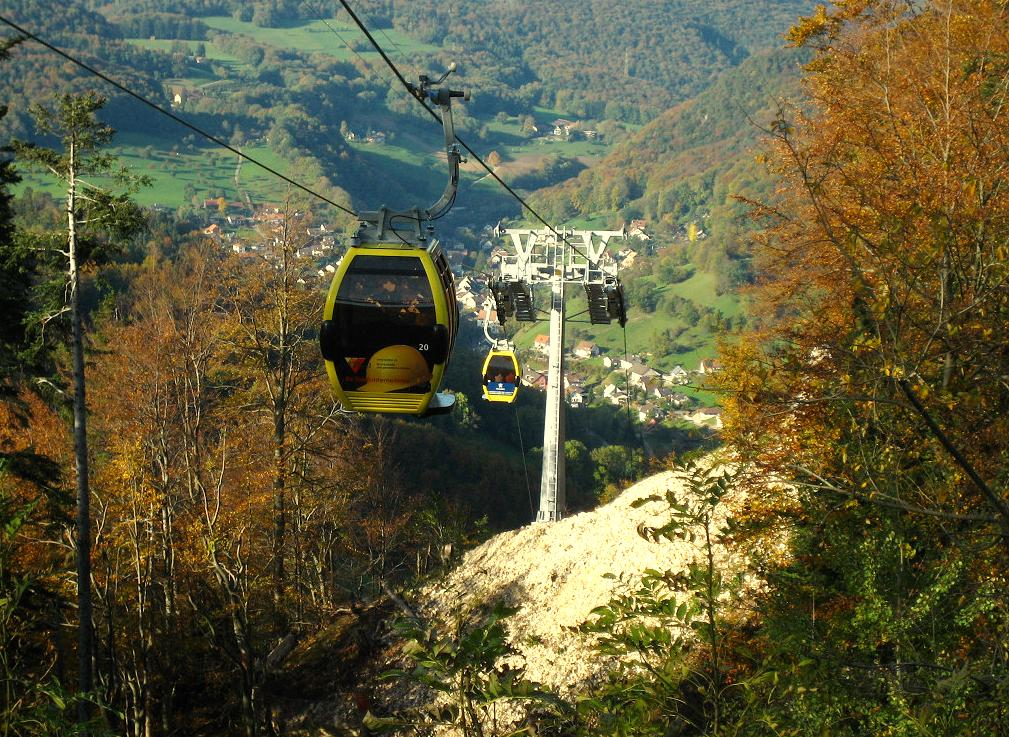
Cable car to Wasserfallen, above Reidgoldswil.

Aerial view (1967)

Reigoldswil has an area, as of 2009, of 9.25 square kilometers (3.57 sq mi). Of this area, 4.27 km^{2} (1.65 sq mi) or 46.2% is used for agricultural purposes, while 4.17 km^{2} (1.61 sq mi) or 45.1% is forested. Of the rest of the land, 0.75 km^{2} (0.29 sq mi) or 8.1% is settled (buildings or roads), 0.01 km^{2} (2.5 acres) or 0.1% is either rivers or lakes.

Of the built up area, housing and buildings made up 4.2% and transportation infrastructure made up 2.8%. Out of the forested land, 41.5% of the total land area is heavily forested and 3.6% is covered with orchards or small clusters of trees. Of the agricultural land, 5.8% is used for growing crops and 32.9% is pastures, while 5.0% is used for orchards or vine crops and 2.5% is used for alpine pastures. All the water in the municipality is in lakes.

The municipality is located in the Waldenburg district, in the far Frenken valley. The current village grew out of three separate medieval villages, in the 18th century. It consists of the villages of Hofstetten-Chilchli, Mittelbiel and Unterbiel.

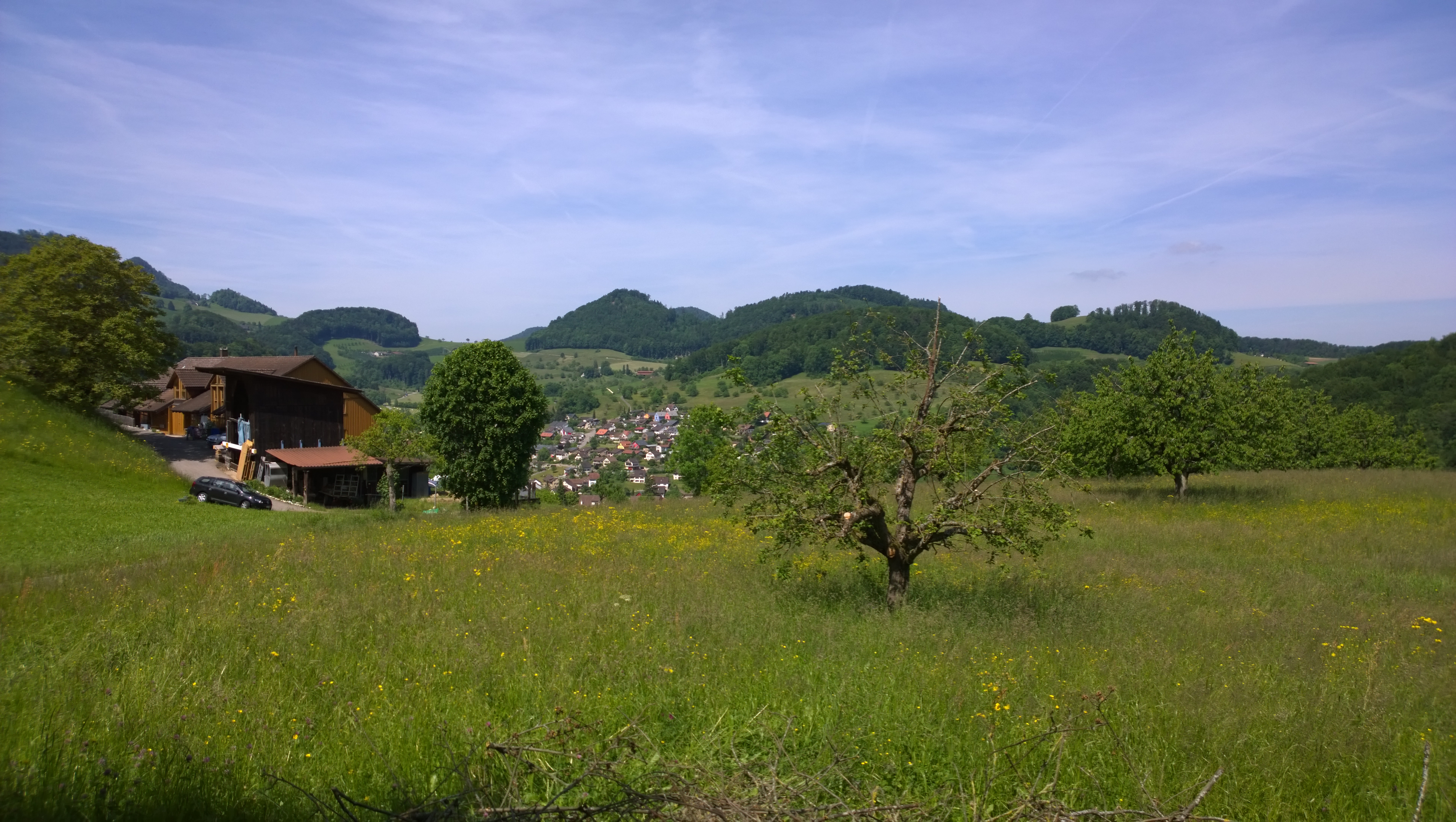
Reigoldswil from a nearby hill, May 2015.

== Coat of arms ==
The blazon of the municipal coat of arms is Per fess, Or, an Eagle displaied Vair, langued beaked and membered Gules, and Azure, a Bend wavy Argent.

== Demographics ==
Reigoldswil has a population (as of June 2021) of 1,583. As of 2008, 8.1% of the population are resident foreign nationals. Over the last 10 years (1997–2007) the population has changed at a rate of 4%.

Most of the population (as of 2000) speaks German (1,419 or 93.4%), with Albanian being second most common (23 or 1.5%) and French being third (20 or 1.3%). There are 2 people who speak Romansh.

As of 2008, the gender distribution of the population was 48.7% male and 51.3% female. The population was made up of 1,397 Swiss citizens (89.5% of the population), and 164 non-Swiss residents (10.5%) Of the population in the municipality 573 or about 37.7% were born in Reigoldswil and lived there in 2000. There were 393 or 25.9% who were born in the same canton, while 335 or 22.0% were born somewhere else in Switzerland, and 153 or 10.1% were born outside of Switzerland.

In 2008 there were 17 live births to Swiss citizens and 3 births to non-Swiss citizens, and in same time span there were 16 deaths of Swiss citizens. Ignoring immigration and emigration, the population of Swiss citizens increased by 1 while the foreign population increased by 3. There were 4 Swiss men who immigrated back to Switzerland. At the same time, there were 4 non-Swiss men who immigrated from another country to Switzerland. The total Swiss population change in 2008 (from all sources, including moves across municipal borders) was an increase of 2 and the non-Swiss population increased by 6 people. This represents a population growth rate of 0.5%.

The age distribution, as of 2010, in Reigoldswil is; 95 children or 6.1% of the population are between 0 and 6 years old and 258 teenagers or 16.5% are between 7 and 19. Of the adult population, 167 people or 10.7% of the population are between 20 and 29 years old. 189 people or 12.1% are between 30 and 39, 263 people or 16.8% are between 40 and 49, and 299 people or 19.2% are between 50 and 64. The senior population distribution is 202 people or 12.9% of the population are between 65 and 79 years old and there are 88 people or 5.6% who are over 80.

As of 2000, there were 584 people who were single and never married in the municipality. There were 769 married individuals, 113 widows or widowers and 54 individuals who are divorced.

As of 2000, there were 612 private households in the municipality, and an average of 2.4 persons per household. There were 193 households that consist of only one person and 54 households with five or more people. Out of a total of 624 households that answered this question, 30.9% were households made up of just one person and 6 were adults who lived with their parents. Of the rest of the households, there are 197 married couples without children, 192 married couples with children There were 19 single parents with a child or children. There were 5 households that were made up unrelated people and 12 households that were made some sort of institution or another collective housing.

In 2000 there were 263 single family homes (or 62.2% of the total) out of a total of 423 inhabited buildings. There were 66 multi-family buildings (15.6%), along with 73 multi-purpose buildings that were mostly used for housing (17.3%) and 21 other use buildings (commercial or industrial) that also had some housing (5.0%). Of the single family homes 53 were built before 1919, while 35 were built between 1990 and 2000.

In 2000 there were 660 apartments in the municipality. The most common apartment size was 4 rooms of which there were 157. There were 20 single room apartments and 256 apartments with five or more rooms. Of these apartments, a total of 592 apartments (89.7% of the total) were permanently occupied, while 33 apartments (5.0%) were seasonally occupied and 35 apartments (5.3%) were empty. As of 2009, the construction rate of new housing units was 3.2 new units per 1000 residents. As of 2000 the average price to rent a two-room apartment was about 758.00 CHF (US$610, £340, €490), a three-room apartment was about 1068.00 CHF (US$850, £480, €680) and a four-room apartment cost an average of 1379.00 CHF (US$1100, £620, €880). The vacancy rate for the municipality, in 2010, was 0.29%.

The historical population is given in the following chart:

== Heritage sites of national significance ==
The House Preiswerk is listed as a Swiss heritage site of national significance.

== Politics ==
In the 2007 federal election the most popular party was the SVP which received 35.07% of the vote. The next three most popular parties were the SP (24.19%), the FDP (14.93%) and the Green Party (14.46%). In the federal election, a total of 527 votes were cast, and the voter turnout was 47.5%.

== Economy ==
As of 2010, Reigoldswil had an unemployment rate of 2.8%. As of 2008, there were 76 people employed in the primary economic sector and about 26 businesses involved in this sector. 85 people were employed in the secondary sector and there were 16 businesses in this sector. 339 people were employed in the tertiary sector, with 53 businesses in this sector. There were 730 residents of the municipality who were employed in some capacity, of which females made up 41.6% of the workforce.

In 2008 the total number of full-time equivalent jobs was 357. The number of jobs in the primary sector was 52, of which 47 were in agriculture and 5 were in forestry or lumber production. The number of jobs in the secondary sector was 68 of which 57 or (83.8%) were in manufacturing and 11 (16.2%) were in construction. The number of jobs in the tertiary sector was 237. In the tertiary sector; 25 or 10.5% were in wholesale or retail sales or the repair of motor vehicles, 16 or 6.8% were in the movement and storage of goods, 17 or 7.2% were in a hotel or restaurant, 1 was the insurance or financial industry, 12 or 5.1% were technical professionals or scientists, 40 or 16.9% were in education and 90 or 38.0% were in health care.

In 2000, there were 223 workers who commuted into the municipality and 486 workers who commuted away. The municipality is a net exporter of workers, with about 2.2 workers leaving the municipality for every one entering. Of the working population, 23.3% used public transportation to get to work, and 47.9% used a private car.

== Religion ==
From the 2000 census, 173 or 11.4% were Roman Catholic, while 1,035 or 68.1% belonged to the Swiss Reformed Church. Of the rest of the population, there were 11 members of an Orthodox church (or about 0.72% of the population), there were 3 individuals (or about 0.20% of the population) who belonged to the Christian Catholic Church, and there were 75 individuals (or about 4.93% of the population) who belonged to another Christian church. There were 42 (or about 2.76% of the population) who were Islamic. There were 4 individuals who were Buddhist and 2 individuals who belonged to another church. 107 (or about 7.04% of the population) belonged to no church, are agnostic or atheist, and 68 individuals (or about 4.47% of the population) did not answer the question.

== Weather ==
Reigoldswil has an average of 145.6 days of rain or snow per year and on average receives 1,175 mm (46.3 in) of precipitation. The wettest month is June during which time Reigoldswil receives an average of 129 mm (5.1 in) of rain or snow. During this month there is precipitation for an average of 13.1 days. The month with the most days of precipitation is May, with an average of 14.8, but with only 116 mm (4.6 in) of rain or snow. The driest month of the year is October with an average of 80 mm (3.1 in) of precipitation over 9.1 days.

== Education ==
In Reigoldswil about 621 or (40.9%) of the population have completed non-mandatory upper secondary education, and 144 or (9.5%) have completed additional higher education (either university or a Fachhochschule). Of the 144 who completed tertiary schooling, 68.1% were Swiss men, 25.0% were Swiss women, 4.9% were non-Swiss men.

As of 2000, there were 174 students in Reigoldswil who came from another municipality, while 34 residents attended schools outside the municipality.
