= Oberdorf, Basel-Landschaft =

Oberdorf
- Municipality
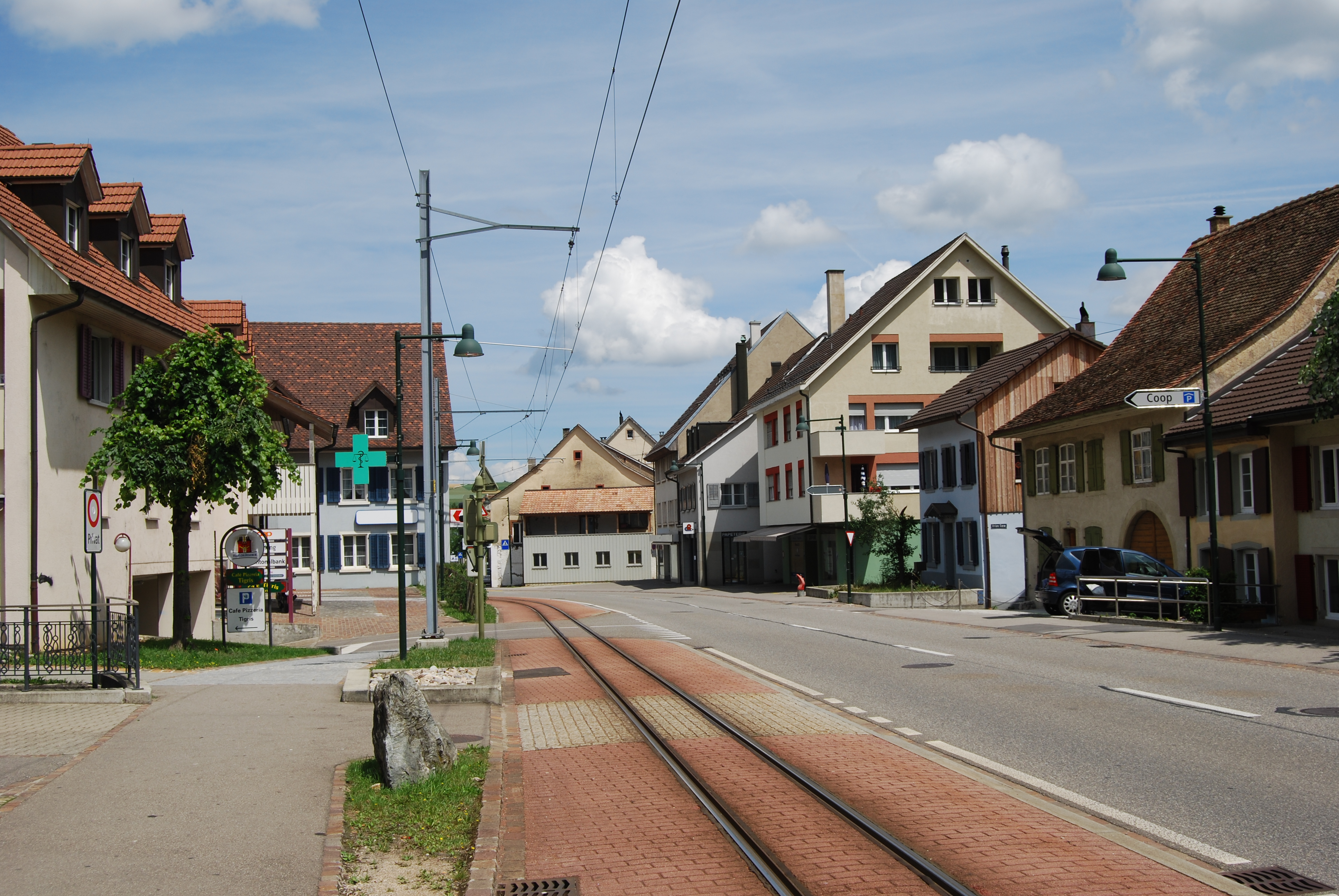

- Coat of arms
- Location of Oberdorf
- Location within Switzerland Location within Canton of Basel-Landschaft
- Coordinates: 47°23′N 7°45′E
- Country: Switzerland
- Canton: Basel-Landschaft
- District: Waldenburg

Area
  - Total: 6.19 km^{2} (2.39 sq mi)
- Elevation: 493 m (1,617 ft)

Population (June 2021)
  - Total: 2,466
  - Density: 398/km^{2} (1,030/sq mi)
- Time zone: UTC+01:00 (CET)
  - Summer (DST): UTC+02:00 (CEST)
- Postal code: 4436
- SFOS number: 2892
- ISO 3166 code: CH-BL
- Surrounded by: Bennwil, Langenbruck, Liedertswil, Niederdorf, Titterten, Waldenburg
- Website: www.oberdorf-bl.ch

Oberdorf is a municipality in the district of Waldenburg in the canton of Basel-Landschaft in Switzerland.

== History ==
Oberdorf is first mentioned in 835 as Honoltesuuilare. In 1345-89 it was mentioned as Onoltzwil in dem obern [...] dorff and in 1491 it was mentioned as Oberdorf. Like Niederdorf it was part of the village of Onoldswil, until that village was dissolved in the 13th Century.

== Geography ==
Aerial view (1953)

Oberdorf has an area, as of 2009, of 6.19 square kilometers (2.39 sq mi). Of this area, 2.69 km^{2} (1.04 sq mi) or 43.5% is used for agricultural purposes, while 2.71 km^{2} (1.05 sq mi) or 43.8% is forested. Of the rest of the land, 0.79 km^{2} (0.31 sq mi) or 12.8% is settled (buildings or roads), 0.03 km^{2} (7.4 acres) or 0.5% is either rivers or lakes.

Of the built up area, housing and buildings made up 7.9% and transportation infrastructure made up 2.6%. while parks, green belts and sports fields made up 1.3%. Out of the forested land, 42.2% of the total land area is heavily forested and 1.6% is covered with orchards or small clusters of trees. Of the agricultural land, 10.2% is used for growing crops and 25.5% is pastures, while 5.7% is used for orchards or vine crops and 2.1% is used for alpine pastures. All the water in the municipality is flowing water.

The municipality is located in the Waldenburg district, in the Waldenburger Valley or Vorderen Frenken Valley on the old road over the Oberen Hauenstein Pass. It consists of the village of Oberdorf and 13 scattered farming settlements, which were all founded since the 19th Century.

== Coat of arms ==
The blazon of the municipal coat of arms is Per bend sinistre Argent and Azure, overall a Key sinister palewise counterchanged.

== Demographics ==
Oberdorf has a population (as of June 2021) of 2,466. As of 2008, 19.7% of the population are resident foreign nationals. Over the last 10 years (1997–2007) the population has changed at a rate of -2.2%.

Most of the population (as of 2000) speaks German (2,058 or 88.7%), with Italian being second most common (99 or 4.3%) and Albanian being third (53 or 2.3%). There are 14 people who speak French and 5 people who speak Romansh.

As of 2008, the gender distribution of the population was 50.4% male and 49.6% female. The population was made up of 1,825 Swiss citizens (80.1% of the population), and 452 non-Swiss residents (19.9%) Of the population in the municipality 584 or about 25.2% were born in Oberdorf and lived there in 2000. There were 710 or 30.6% who were born in the same canton, while 561 or 24.2% were born somewhere else in Switzerland, and 411 or 17.7% were born outside of Switzerland.

In 2008 there were 11 live births to Swiss citizens and 6 births to non-Swiss citizens, and in same time span there were 13 deaths of Swiss citizens and 1 non-Swiss citizen death. Ignoring immigration and emigration, the population of Swiss citizens decreased by 2 while the foreign population increased by 5. There were 3 Swiss men who emigrated from Switzerland and 2 Swiss women who immigrated back to Switzerland. At the same time, there were 6 non-Swiss men and 5 non-Swiss women who immigrated from another country to Switzerland. The total Swiss population change in 2008 (from all sources, including moves across municipal borders) was a decrease of 21 and the non-Swiss population increased by 19 people. This represents a population growth rate of -0.1%.

The age distribution, as of 2010, in Oberdorf is; 129 children or 5.7% of the population are between 0 and 6 years old and 391 teenagers or 17.2% are between 7 and 19. Of the adult population, 291 people or 12.8% of the population are between 20 and 29 years old. 243 people or 10.7% are between 30 and 39, 368 people or 16.2% are between 40 and 49, and 464 people or 20.4% are between 50 and 64. The senior population distribution is 291 people or 12.8% of the population are between 65 and 79 years old and there are 100 people or 4.4% who are over 80.

As of 2000, there were 939 people who were single and never married in the municipality. There were 1,172 married individuals, 129 widows or widowers and 79 individuals who are divorced.

As of 2000, there were 887 private households in the municipality, and an average of 2.6 persons per household. There were 216 households that consist of only one person and 92 households with five or more people. Out of a total of 906 households that answered this question, 23.8% were households made up of just one person and 11 were adults who lived with their parents. Of the rest of the households, there are 299 married couples without children, 301 married couples with children There were 51 single parents with a child or children. There were 9 households that were made up unrelated people and 19 households that were made some sort of institution or another collective housing.

In 2000 there were 432 single family homes (or 69.5% of the total) out of a total of 622 inhabited buildings. There were 89 multi-family buildings (14.3%), along with 67 multi-purpose buildings that were mostly used for housing (10.8%) and 34 other use buildings (commercial or industrial) that also had some housing (5.5%). Of the single family homes 33 were built before 1919, while 80 were built between 1990 and 2000. The greatest number of single family homes (85) were built between 1946 and 1960.

In 2000 there were 996 apartments in the municipality. The most common apartment size was 4 rooms of which there were 289. There were 60 single room apartments and 390 apartments with five or more rooms. Of these apartments, a total of 876 apartments (88.0% of the total) were permanently occupied, while 85 apartments (8.5%) were seasonally occupied and 35 apartments (3.5%) were empty. As of 2009, the construction rate of new housing units was 0.9 new units per 1000 residents. The vacancy rate for the municipality, in 2010, was 0.86%.

The historical population is given in the following chart:

== Politics ==
In the 2007 federal election the most popular party was the SVP which received 35.21% of the vote. The next three most popular parties were the SP (24.54%), the FDP (14.11%) and the Green Party (13.67%). In the federal election, a total of 760 votes were cast, and the voter turnout was 50.8%.

== Economy ==
As of 2010, Oberdorf had an unemployment rate of 3.8%. As of 2008, there were 39 people employed in the primary economic sector and about 13 businesses involved in this sector. 746 people were employed in the secondary sector and there were 28 businesses in this sector. 412 people were employed in the tertiary sector, with 78 businesses in this sector. There were 1,197 residents of the municipality who were employed in some capacity, of which females made up 43.1% of the workforce.

In 2008 the total number of full-time equivalent jobs was 1,026. The number of jobs in the primary sector was 24, of which19 were in agriculture and 5 were in forestry or lumber production. The number of jobs in the secondary sector was 700 of which 647 or (92.4%) were in manufacturing and 53 (7.6%) were in construction. The number of jobs in the tertiary sector was 302. In the tertiary sector; 94 or 31.1% were in wholesale or retail sales or the repair of motor vehicles, 14 or 4.6% were in the movement and storage of goods, 21 or 7.0% were in a hotel or restaurant, 21 or 7.0% were in the information industry, 15 or 5.0% were the insurance or financial industry, 33 or 10.9% were technical professionals or scientists, 55 or 18.2% were in education and 17 or 5.6% were in health care.

In 2000, there were 718 workers who commuted into the municipality and 797 workers who commuted away. The municipality is a net exporter of workers, with about 1.1 workers leaving the municipality for every one entering. About 4.0% of the workforce coming into Oberdorf are coming from outside Switzerland. Of the working population, 23.9% used public transportation to get to work, and 44.5% used a private car.

== Religion ==
From the 2000 census, 542 or 23.4% were Roman Catholic, while 1,261 or 54.4% belonged to the Swiss Reformed Church. Of the rest of the population, there were 28 members of an Orthodox church (or about 1.21% of the population), there were 17 individuals (or about 0.73% of the population) who belonged to the Christian Catholic Church, and there were 72 individuals (or about 3.10% of the population) who belonged to another Christian church. There was 1 individual who was Jewish, and 153 (or about 6.60% of the population) who were Islamic. There were 2 individuals who were Buddhist, 3 individuals who were Hindu and 1 individual who belonged to another church. 184 (or about 7.93% of the population) belonged to no church, are agnostic or atheist, and 55 individuals (or about 2.37% of the population) did not answer the question.

== Education ==
In Oberdorf about 863 or (37.2%) of the population have completed non-mandatory upper secondary education, and 228 or (9.8%) have completed additional higher education (either university or a Fachhochschule). Of the 228 who completed tertiary schooling, 70.6% were Swiss men, 19.3% were Swiss women, 5.7% were non-Swiss men and 4.4% were non-Swiss women.

As of 2000, there were 299 students in Oberdorf who came from another municipality, while 69 residents attended schools outside the municipality.

== Transport ==
Oberdorf is served by the Waldenburg narrow gauge railway, which operates a quarter-hourly train service to Liestal. At Liestal railway station, onward connection is made with the Swiss Federal Railway's services to Basel, Bern, Lucerne and Zürich.
