= Titterten =

- Municipality
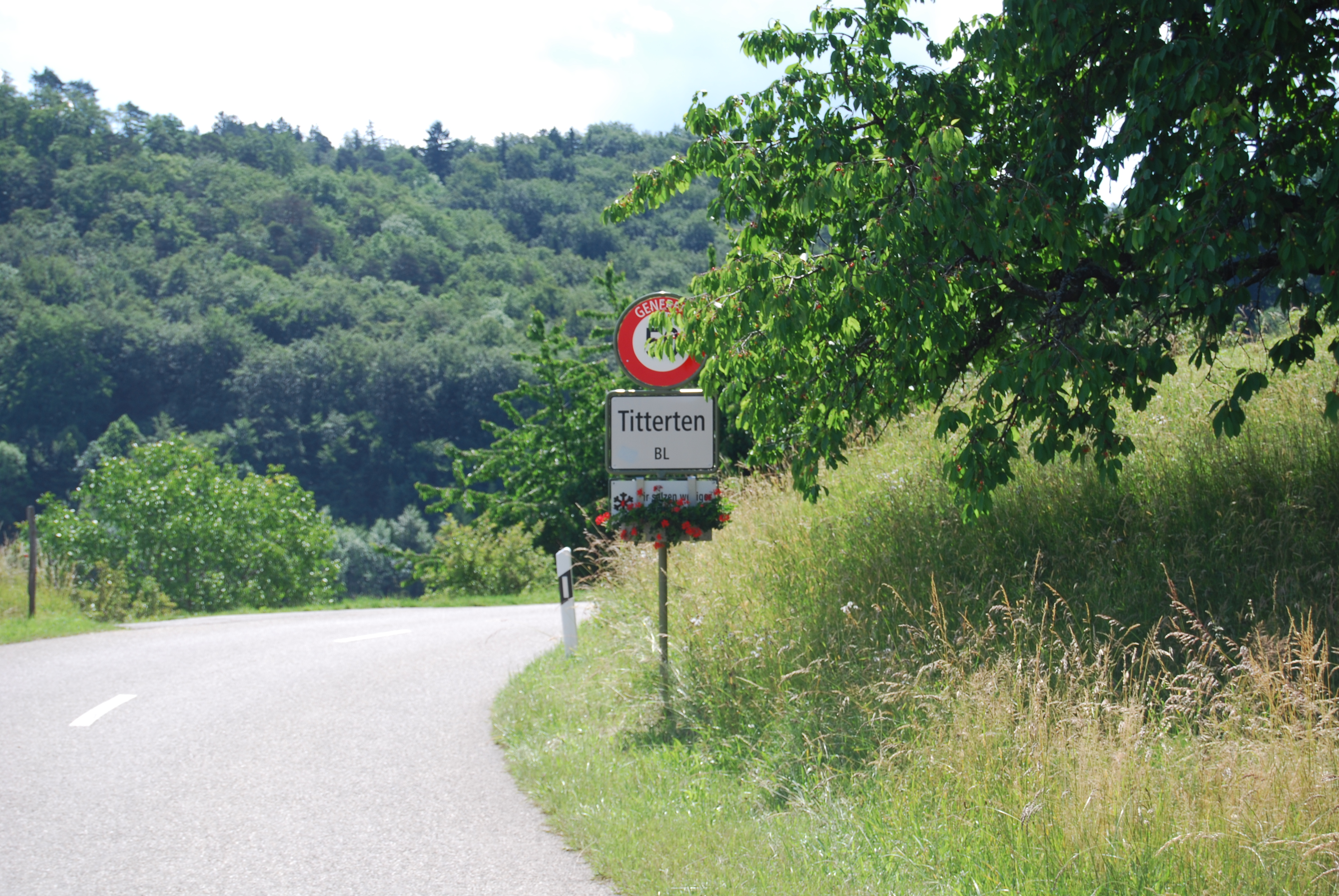

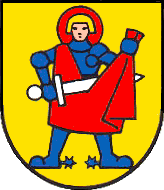
- Coat of arms
- Location of Titterten
- Location within Switzerland Location within Canton of Basel-Landschaft
- Coordinates: 47°24′N 7°43′E
- Country: Switzerland
- Canton: Basel-Landschaft
- District: Waldenburg

Area
  - Total: 3.71 km^{2} (1.43 sq mi)
- Elevation: 668 m (2,192 ft)

Population (June 2021)
  - Total: 430
  - Density: 120/km^{2} (300/sq mi)
- Time zone: UTC+01:00 (CET)
  - Summer (DST): UTC+02:00 (CEST)
- Postal code: 4425
- SFOS number: 2894
- ISO 3166 code: CH-BL
- Surrounded by: Arboldswil, Liedertswil, Niederdorf, Oberdorf, Reigoldswil
- Website: www.titterten.ch

Titterten is a municipality in the district of Waldenburg in the canton of Basel-Country in Switzerland.

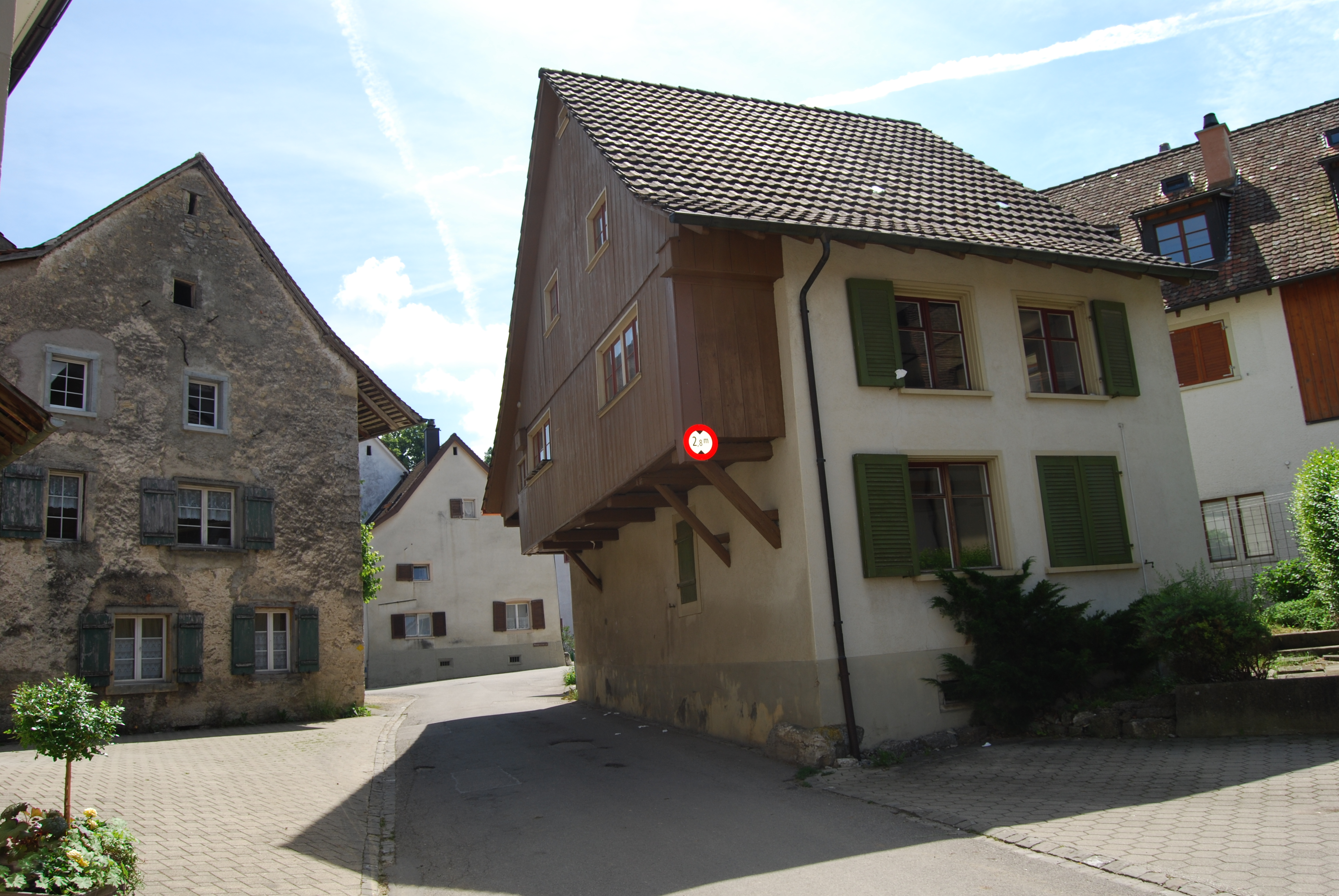
Titterten

== Geography ==
Aerial view (1953)

Titterten has an area, as of 2009, of 3.71 square kilometers (1.43 sq mi). Of this area, 2.11 km^{2} (0.81 sq mi) or 56.9% is used for agricultural purposes, while 1.35 km^{2} (0.52 sq mi) or 36.4% is forested. Of the rest of the land, 0.23 km^{2} (0.089 sq mi) or 6.2% is settled (buildings or roads) and 0.01 km^{2} (2.5 acres) or 0.3% is unproductive land.

Of the built up area, housing and buildings made up 3.0% and transportation infrastructure made up 2.7%. Out of the forested land, 34.8% of the total land area is heavily forested and 1.6% is covered with orchards or small clusters of trees. Of the agricultural land, 20.5% is used for growing crops and 28.0% is pastures, while 8.4% is used for orchards or vine crops.

== Coat of arms ==
The blazon of the municipal coat of arms is Or, St. Martin statant armoured Azure, nimbed and clothed Gules and holding a sword Argent cutting his cloth in two.

== Demographics ==
Titterten has a population (as of June 2021) of 430. As of 2008, 4.3% of the population are resident foreign nationals. Over the last 10 years (1997–2007) the population has changed at a rate of -0.3%.

Most of the population (as of 2000) speaks German (377 or 99.2%), with French being second most common (1 or 0.3%) and English being third (1 or 0.3%).

As of 2008, the gender distribution of the population was 48.8% male and 51.3% female. The population was made up of 379 Swiss citizens (94.8% of the population), and 21 non-Swiss residents (5.3%) Of the population in the municipality 152 or about 40.0% were born in Titterten and lived there in 2000. There were 119 or 31.3% who were born in the same canton, while 83 or 21.8% were born somewhere else in Switzerland, and 19 or 5.0% were born outside of Switzerland.

In 2008 there were 5 live births to Swiss citizens and 1 birth to non-Swiss citizens, and in same time span there were 6 deaths of Swiss citizens. Ignoring immigration and emigration, the population of Swiss citizens decreased by 1 while the foreign population increased by 1. There was 1 Swiss man who emigrated from Switzerland. At the same time, there were 2 non-Swiss women who immigrated from another country to Switzerland. The total Swiss population change in 2008 (from all sources, including moves across municipal borders) was an increase of 8 and the non-Swiss population remained the same. This represents a population growth rate of 2.0%.

The age distribution, as of 2010, in Titterten is; 23 children or 5.8% of the population are between 0 and 6 years old and 61 teenagers or 15.3% are between 7 and 19. Of the adult population, 30 people or 7.5% of the population are between 20 and 29 years old. 40 people or 10.0% are between 30 and 39, 76 people or 19.0% are between 40 and 49, and 99 people or 24.8% are between 50 and 64. The senior population distribution is 53 people or 13.3% of the population are between 65 and 79 years old and there are 18 people or 4.5% who are over 80.

As of 2000, there were 136 people who were single and never married in the municipality. There were 213 married individuals, 19 widows or widowers and 12 individuals who are divorced.

As of 2000, there were 155 private households in the municipality, and an average of 2.4 persons per household. There were 36 households that consist of only one person and 12 households with five or more people. Out of a total of 156 households that answered this question, 23.1% were households made up of just one person. Of the rest of the households, there are 59 married couples without children and 52 married couples with children. There were 6 single parents with one or more children. There were 2 households that were made up unrelated people and 1 household that was made some sort of institution or another collective housing.

In 2000 there were 77 single-family homes (or 58.8% of the total) out of a total of 131 inhabited buildings. There were 17 multi-family buildings (13.0%), along with 31 multi-purpose buildings that were mostly used for housing (23.7%) and 6 other use buildings (commercial or industrial) that also had some housing (4.6%). Of the single-family homes 15 were built before 1919, while 11 were built between 1990 and 2000. The greatest number of single-family homes (17) were built between 1971 and 1980.

In 2000 there were 165 apartments in the municipality. The most common apartment size was 5 rooms of which there were 47. There were 3 single-room apartments and 77 apartments with five or more rooms. Of these apartments, a total of 151 apartments (91.5% of the total) were permanently occupied, while 11 apartments (6.7%) were seasonally occupied and 3 apartments (1.8%) were empty. As of 2009, the construction rate of new housing units was 5 new units per 1000 residents. The vacancy rate for the municipality, in 2010, was 0%.

The historical population is given in the following chart:

== Politics ==
In the 2007 federal election the most popular party was the SVP which received 37.66% of the vote. The next three most popular parties were the SP (24.13%), the Green Party (15.31%) and the FDP (12.24%). In the federal election, a total of 211 votes were cast, and the voter turnout was 64.5%.

== Economy ==
As of 2010, Titterten had an unemployment rate of 2.4%. As of 2008, there were 33 people employed in the primary economic sector and about 12 businesses involved in this sector. 13 people were employed in the secondary sector and there were 6 businesses in this sector. 37 people were employed in the tertiary sector, with 8 businesses in this sector. There were 200 residents of the municipality who were employed in some capacity, of which females made up 46.5% of the workforce.

In 2008 the total number of full-time equivalent jobs was 60. The number of jobs in the primary sector was 21, all of which were in agriculture. The number of jobs in the secondary sector was 11 of which 2 or (18.2%) were in manufacturing and 9 (81.8%) were in construction. The number of jobs in the tertiary sector was 28. In the tertiary sector; 1 was in the sale or repair of motor vehicles, 7 or 25.0% were technical professionals or scientists, 1 was in education.

In 2000, there were 39 workers who commuted into the municipality and 136 workers who commuted away. The municipality is a net exporter of workers, with about 3.5 workers leaving the municipality for every one entering. Of the working population, 19% used public transportation to get to work, and 48.5% used a private car.

== Religion ==
From the 2000 census, 22 or 5.8% were Roman Catholic, while 319 or 83.9% belonged to the Swiss Reformed Church. Of the rest of the population, there was 1 individual who belongs to the Christian Catholic Church, and there were 2 individuals (or about 0.53% of the population) who belonged to another Christian church. There was 1 individual who was Islamic. 28 (or about 7.37% of the population) belonged to no church, are agnostic or atheist, and 7 individuals (or about 1.84% of the population) did not answer the question.

== Education ==
In Titterten about 168 or (44.2%) of the population have completed non-mandatory upper secondary education, and 41 or (10.8%) have completed additional higher education (either university or a Fachhochschule). Of the 41 who completed tertiary schooling, 75.6% were Swiss men, 17.1% were Swiss women.

As of 2000, there were 18 students in Titterten who came from another municipality, while 36 residents attended schools outside the municipality.
