= Altenberg Castle =

Castle in Füllinsdorf, Switzerland

- Füllinsdorf
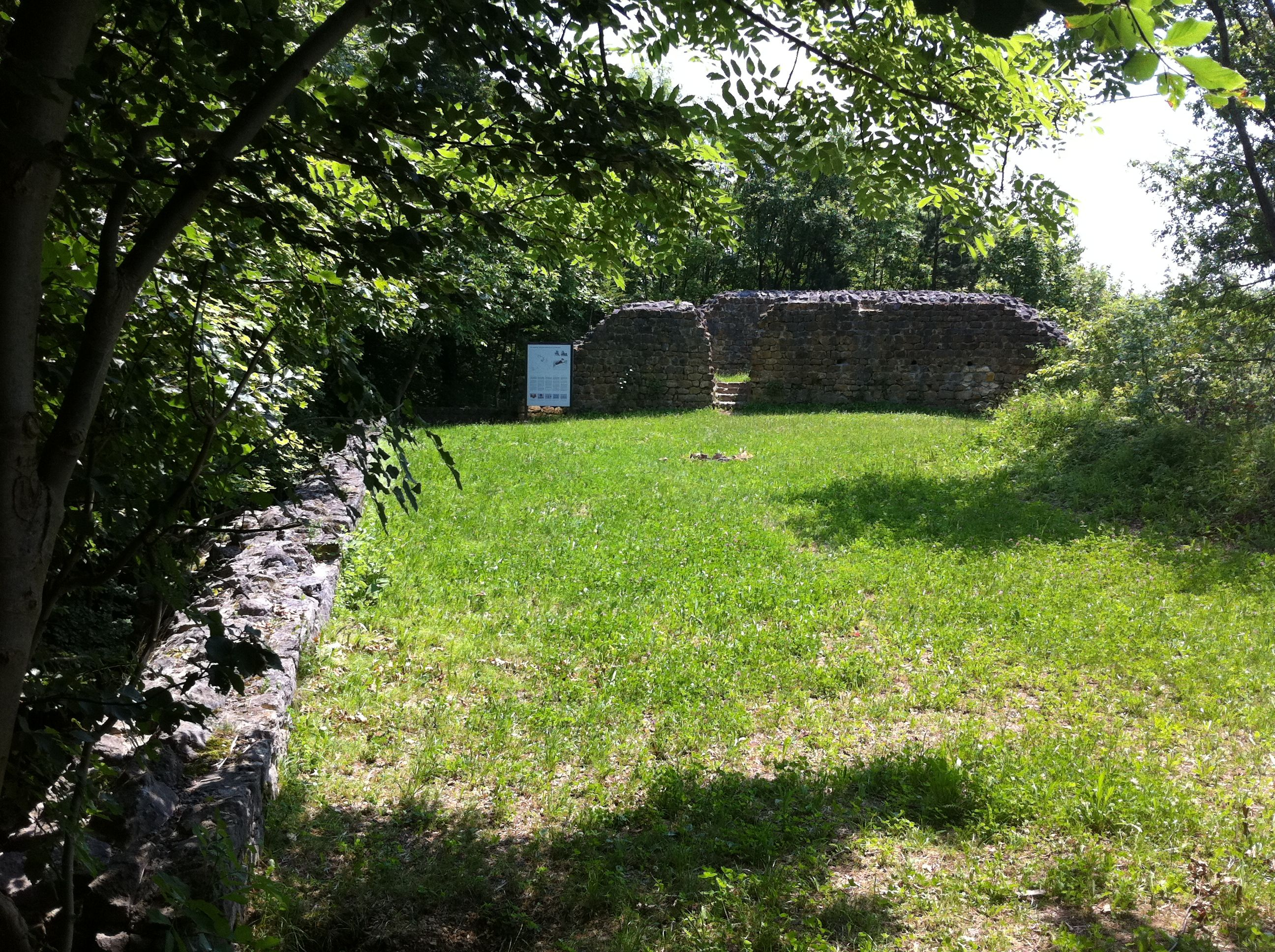

Site information
- Code: CH-BL
- Condition: Ruins

Location
- Coordinates: 47°30′34.31″N 7°44′23.84″E
- Height: 530 m

Site history
- Built: Approx. 1000

Altenberg Castle (German: Burg Altenberg) is a ruined castle in the municipality of Füllinsdorf in the canton of Basel-Land in Switzerland.

== History ==
The castle was built around 1000 for a member of the high nobility. However, the castle does not appear in any surviving documents and was probably abandoned within a century. Everything that is known about the castle therefore comes from archeological excavations. At the time of its construction, the site was on the border between the Kingdom of Germany and the Kingdom of Burgundy / of Arles. The castle was probably built by a member of the high nobility to expand their power in this border region. From the castle they probably ruled over the villages of Füllinsdorf, Frenkendorf and the abandoned village of Munzach. A fire around 1050 destroyed part of the castle after which it was rebuilt. By the 12th century the noble family had moved to Neu-Schauenburg Castle and were known as the Lords of Schauenburg. Many of the wooden buildings and fixtures were stripped out of Altenberg and probably moved to Neu-Schauenburg.

In the 17th and 18th centuries, the ruins were still visible and were also known as Filisberg. This name may have the same origin as the name of the village, Füllinsdorf. By the 20th century the ruins were overgrown and covered by soil with only a few traces of walls still visible. An excavation in 1982 identified the massive tower and in 1986/87 the entire site was excavated and repaired. The excavation discovered over 250 items including a piece of gold and silver jewellery. A number of bones were also discovered including herring bones, a very rare find in land locked Switzerland.

== Castle site ==
In the center of the site is a large tower house which covers about 9 by 15 meters (30 ft × 49 ft) and has 1.6 m (5.2 ft) thick walls. North-west of the tower is a 35 m (115 ft) long section of the curtain wall. A double garderobe or bathroom is built into the curtain wall. On the north end of the complex was a residential tract with a kitchen. The gatehouse was in the southern corner of the castle.

== See also ==
- List of castles in Switzerland
