= Augstgau =

Augstgau is the name for one of two medieval counties (gau being an old German word for county):

- Augusta Raurica, today in Switzerland (historically Rhaetia)
- Augsburg, today in Bavaria (historically Swabia)
