= Frenkendorf =

- Municipality
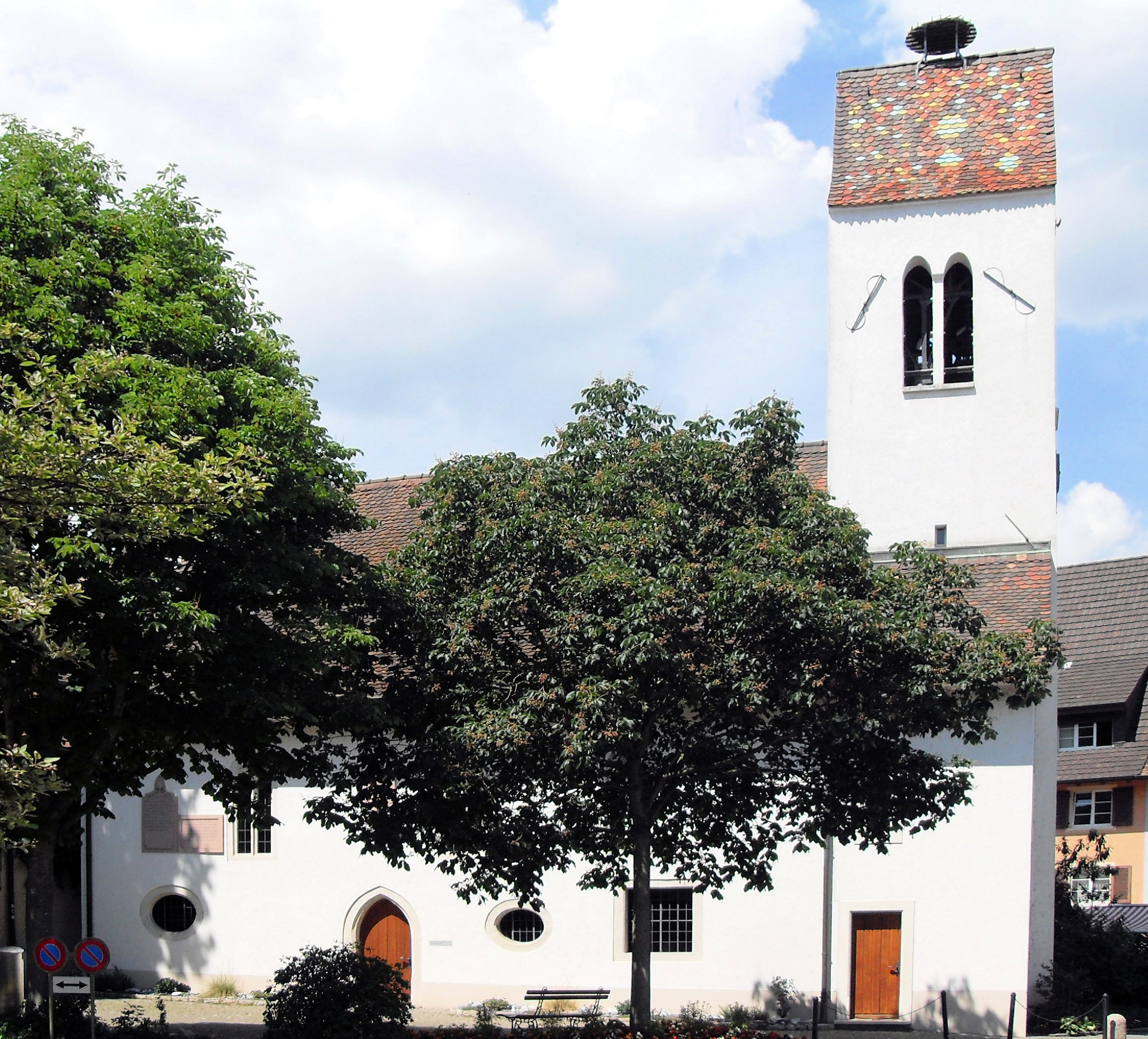

- Flag Coat of arms
- Location of Frenkendorf
- Location within Switzerland Location within Canton of Basel-Landschaft
- Coordinates: 47°30′N 7°43′E
- Country: Switzerland
- Canton: Basel-Landschaft
- District: Liestal

Area
  - Total: 4.6 km^{2} (1.8 sq mi)
- Elevation: 337 m (1,106 ft)

Population (June 2021)
  - Total: 6,511
  - Density: 1,400/km^{2} (3,700/sq mi)
- Time zone: UTC+01:00 (CET)
  - Summer (DST): UTC+02:00 (CEST)
- Postal code: 4402
- SFOS number: 2824
- ISO 3166 code: CH-BL
- Surrounded by: Füllinsdorf, Gempen (SO), Liestal, Muttenz, Nuglar-Sankt Pantaleon (SO), Pratteln
- Website: frenkendorf.ch

Frenkendorf is a municipality in the district of Liestal in the canton of Basel-Country in Switzerland.

== History ==
Frenkendorf is first mentioned in 1249 as Frenchendorf.

== Geography ==
Aerial view (1956)

Frenkendorf has an area, as of 2009, of 4.6 square kilometers (1.8 sq mi). Of this area, 1.27 km^{2} (0.49 sq mi) or 27.6% is used for agricultural purposes, while 1.93 km^{2} (0.75 sq mi) or 42.0% is forested. Of the rest of the land, 1.39 km^{2} (0.54 sq mi) or 30.2% is settled (buildings or roads) and 0.01 km^{2} (2.5 acres) or 0.2% is unproductive land.

Of the built up area, industrial buildings made up 4.3% of the total area while housing and buildings made up 18.7% and transportation infrastructure made up 6.1%. while parks, green belts and sports fields made up 1.1%. Out of the forested land, 40.7% of the total land area is heavily forested and 1.3% is covered with orchards or small clusters of trees. Of the agricultural land, 10.2% is used for growing crops and 13.9% is pastures, while 3.5% is used for orchards or vine crops.

The municipality is located in the Liestal district. The old village center is located on a terrace above the Ergolz valley. After 1854, the settlement of Neu-Frenkendorf grew up in the valley along the Basel-Olten railway line.

== Coat of arms ==
The blazon of the municipal coat of arms is Azure, Moon Argent.

== Demographics ==
Frenkendorf has a population (as of June 2021) of 6,511. As of 2008, 28.5% of the population are resident foreign nationals. Over the last 10 years (1997–2007) the population has changed at a rate of 6.2%.

Most of the population (as of 2000) speaks German (4,817 or 84.5%), with Italian language being second most common (308 or 5.4%) and Turkish being third (108 or 1.9%). There are 40 people who speak French and 2 people who speak Romansh.

As of 2008, the gender distribution of the population was 49.5% male and 50.5% female. The population was made up of 4,360 Swiss citizens (71.5% of the population), and 1,734 non-Swiss residents (28.5%) Of the population in the municipality 1,300 or about 22.8% were born in Frenkendorf and lived there in 2000. There were 1,336 or 23.4% who were born in the same canton, while 1,509 or 26.5% were born somewhere else in Switzerland, and 1,367 or 24.0% were born outside of Switzerland.

In 2008 there were 42 live births to Swiss citizens and 18 births to non-Swiss citizens, and in same time span there were 38 deaths of Swiss citizens and 5 non-Swiss citizen deaths. Ignoring immigration and emigration, the population of Swiss citizens increased by 4 while the foreign population increased by 13. There were 4 Swiss men who emigrated from Switzerland. At the same time, there were 32 non-Swiss men and 37 non-Swiss women who immigrated from another country to Switzerland. The total Swiss population change in 2008 (from all sources, including moves across municipal borders) was a decrease of 81 and the non-Swiss population increased by 81 people. This represents a population growth rate of 0.0%.

The age distribution, as of 2010, in Frenkendorf is; 404 children or 6.6% of the population are between 0 and 6 years old and 893 teenagers or 14.7% are between 7 and 19. Of the adult population, 770 people or 12.6% of the population are between 20 and 29 years old. 795 people or 13.0% are between 30 and 39, 1,026 people or 16.8% are between 40 and 49, and 1,227 people or 20.1% are between 50 and 64. The senior population distribution is 735 people or 12.1% of the population are between 65 and 79 years old and there are 244 people or 4.0% who are over 80.

As of 2000, there were 2,247 people who were single and never married in the municipality. There were 2,849 married individuals, 272 widows or widowers and 335 individuals who are divorced.

As of 2000, there were 2,555 private households in the municipality, and an average of 2.2 persons per household. There were 928 households that consist of only one person and 113 households with five or more people. Out of a total of 2,613 households that answered this question, 35.5% were households made up of just one person and 12 were adults who lived with their parents. Of the rest of the households, there are 720 married couples without children, 731 married couples with children There were 130 single parents with a child or children. There were 34 households that were made up unrelated people and 58 households that were made some sort of institution or another collective housing.

In 2000 there were 669 single-family homes (or 63.2% of the total) out of a total of 1,058 inhabited buildings. There were 246 multi-family buildings (23.3%), along with 92 multi-purpose buildings that were mostly used for housing (8.7%) and 51 other use buildings (commercial or industrial) that also had some housing (4.8%). Of the single-family homes 40 were built before 1919, while 114 were built between 1990 and 2000. The greatest number of single-family homes (143) were built between 1946 and 1960.

In 2000 there were 2,742 apartments in the municipality. The most common apartment size was 4 rooms of which there were 858. There were 92 single-room apartments and 600 apartments with five or more rooms. Of these apartments, a total of 2,497 apartments (91.1% of the total) were permanently occupied, while 208 apartments (7.6%) were seasonally occupied and 37 apartments (1.3%) were empty. As of 2007, the construction rate of new housing units was 1.5 new units per 1000 residents. As of 2000 the average price to rent a two-room apartment was about 786.00 CHF (US$630, £350, €500), a three-room apartment was about 993.00 CHF (US$790, £450, €640) and a four-room apartment cost an average of 1228.00 CHF (US$980, £550, €790). The vacancy rate for the municipality, in 2008, was 0.83%.

The historical population is given in the following chart:

== Sights ==
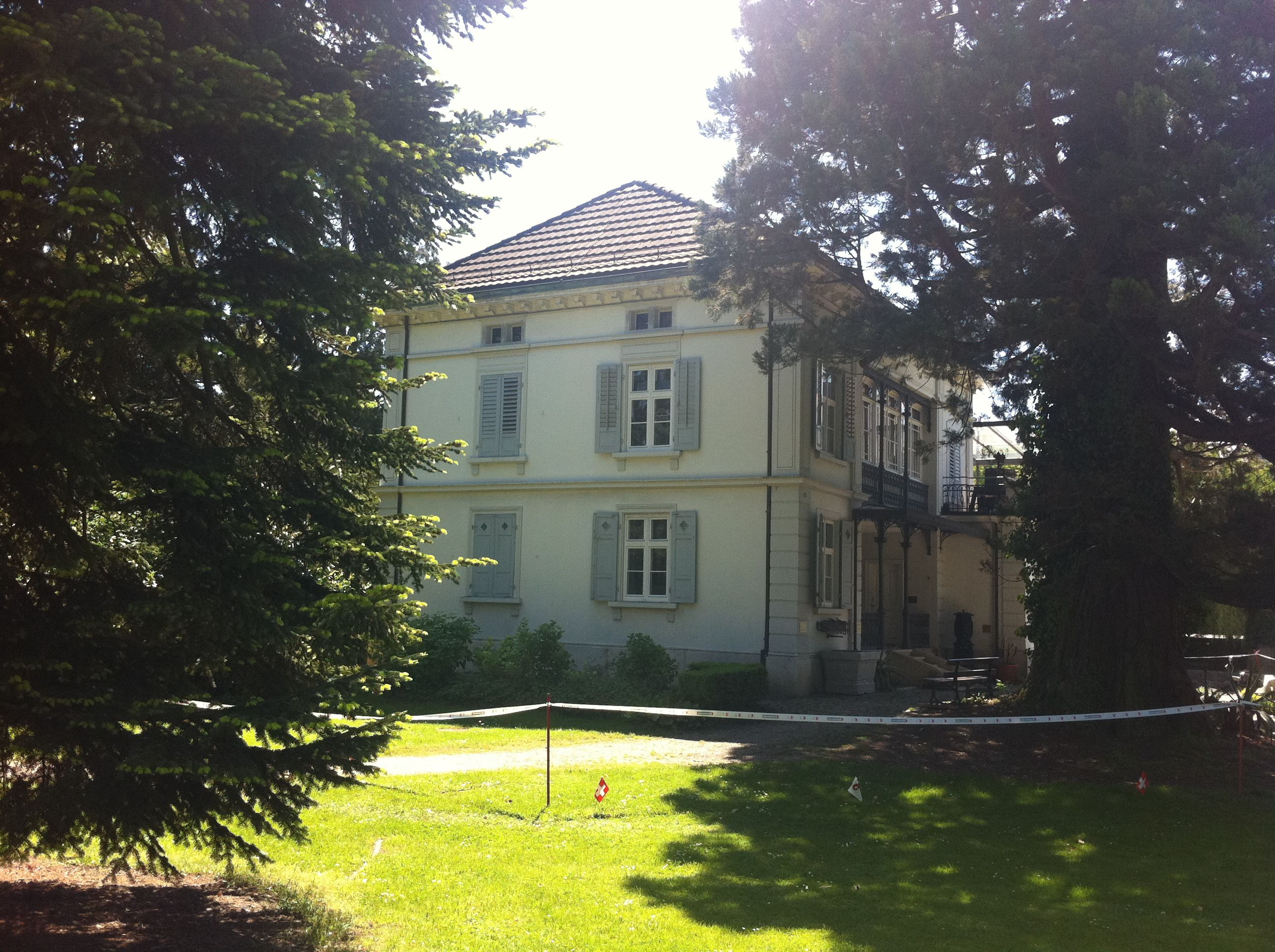
The Villa Sacher, now a municipal museum

The Villa Sacher, with its collection of modern art, was listed as a heritage site of national significance in 1995, but no longer appears on the list.

The ruins of Alt-Schauenburg Castle and Neu-Schauenburg Castle are near the village.

== Politics ==
In the 2007 federal election the most popular party was the SP which received 31.8% of the vote. The next three most popular parties were the SVP (26.67%), the FDP (16.73%) and the Green Party (13.14%). In the federal election, a total of 1,694 votes were cast, and the voter turnout was 46.0%.

== Economy ==
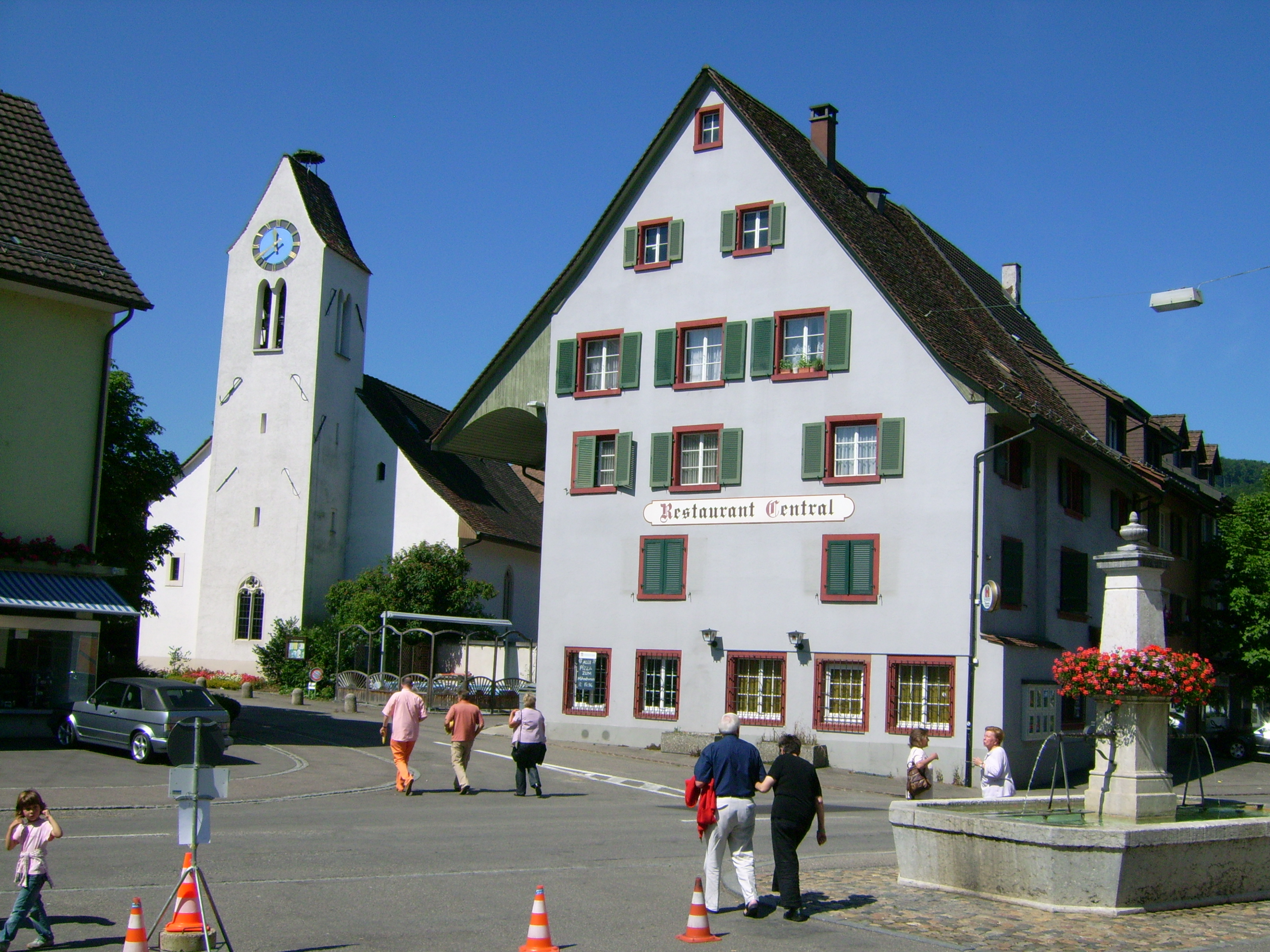
Frenkendorf village center, with the church and the Central Restaurant

As of 2007, Frenkendorf had an unemployment rate of 3.37%. As of 2005, there were 24 people employed in the primary economic sector and about 6 businesses involved in this sector. 518 people were employed in the secondary sector and there were 41 businesses in this sector. 1,074 people were employed in the tertiary sector, with 151 businesses in this sector. There were 3,112 residents of the municipality who were employed in some capacity, of which females made up 45.1% of the workforce.

In 2008 the total number of full-time equivalent jobs was 1,449. The number of jobs in the primary sector was 6, all of which were in agriculture. The number of jobs in the secondary sector was 455, of which 350 or (76.9%) were in manufacturing and 102 (22.4%) were in construction. The number of jobs in the tertiary sector was 988. In the tertiary sector; 400 or 40.5% were in wholesale or retail sales or the repair of motor vehicles, 89 or 9.0% were in the movement and storage of goods, 53 or 5.4% were in a hotel or restaurant, 21 or 2.1% were in the information industry, 1 or 0.1% were the insurance or financial industry, 41 or 4.1% were technical professionals or scientists, 96 or 9.7% were in education and 76 or 7.7% were in health care.

In 2000, there were 1,255 workers who commuted into the municipality and 2,560 workers who commuted away. The municipality is a net exporter of workers, with about 2.0 workers leaving the municipality for every one entering. About 10.0% of the workforce coming into Frenkendorf are coming from outside Switzerland, while 0.2% of the locals commute out of Switzerland for work. Of the working population, 26.9% used public transportation to get to work, and 43.1% used a private car.

== Religion ==
From the 2000 census, 1,633 or 28.6% were Roman Catholic, while 2,534 or 44.4% belonged to the Swiss Reformed Church. Of the rest of the population, there were 147 members of an Orthodox church (or about 2.58% of the population), there were 23 individuals (or about 0.40% of the population) who belonged to the Christian Catholic Church, and there were 138 individuals (or about 2.42% of the population) who belonged to another Christian church. There were 386 (or about 6.77% of the population) who were Islamic. There were 8 individuals who were Buddhist, 43 individuals who were Hindu and 1 individual who belonged to another church. 601 (or about 10.54% of the population) belonged to no church, are agnostic or atheist, and 189 individuals (or about 3.31% of the population) did not answer the question.

== Transport ==
Frenkendorf sits on the Hauenstein line and is served by trains at Frenkendorf-Füllinsdorf railway station.

== Education ==
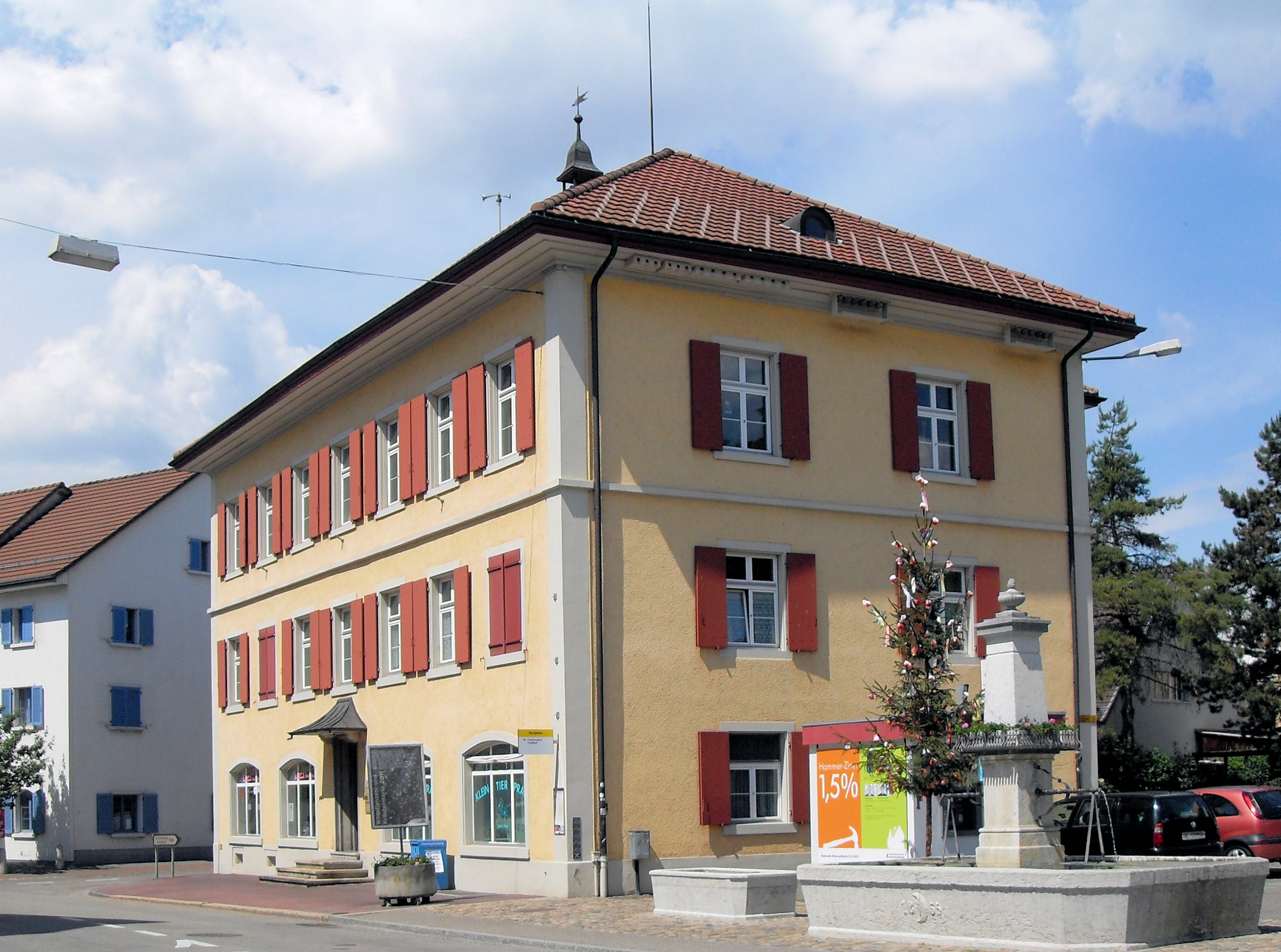
The old village school house

In Frenkendorf about 2,245 or (39.4%) of the population have completed non-mandatory upper secondary education, and 654 or (11.5%) have completed additional higher education (either university or a Fachhochschule). Of the 654 who completed tertiary schooling, 63.6% were Swiss men, 20.8% were Swiss women, 9.9% were non-Swiss men and 5.7% were non-Swiss women.

As of 2000, there were 149 students in Frenkendorf who came from another municipality, while 182 residents attended schools outside the municipality.

== Crime ==
In 2014 the crime rate, of the over 200 crimes listed in the Swiss Criminal Code (running from murder, robbery and assault to accepting bribes and election fraud), in Frenkendorf was 50 per thousand residents, slightly lower than the national average (64.6 per thousand). During the same period, the rate of drug crimes was 1.6 per thousand residents. This rate is lower than average, at only 53.3% of the rate in the district, 59.3% of the cantonal rate and only 16.2% of the national rate. The rate of violations of immigration, visa and work permit laws was 1.4 per thousand residents. This rate is 55.6% greater than the rate in the canton, but is only 28.6% of the rate for the entire country.
