= Augusta Munatiana =

Augusta Munatiana also known as Rauracorum was a Roman colony six miles from Basle. The original town had been an Oppidum of the Raurici Celtic tribe at Basel-Gasfabrik.

During the Roman Empire it was a large town, mentioned on the Tabula Peutingeriana and prospered due to its proximity to the regional capital Augusta Raurica on the crossroads and the Pax Romana, but shrunk during the Middle Ages to be a mere village.
