= Arisdorf =

- Municipality
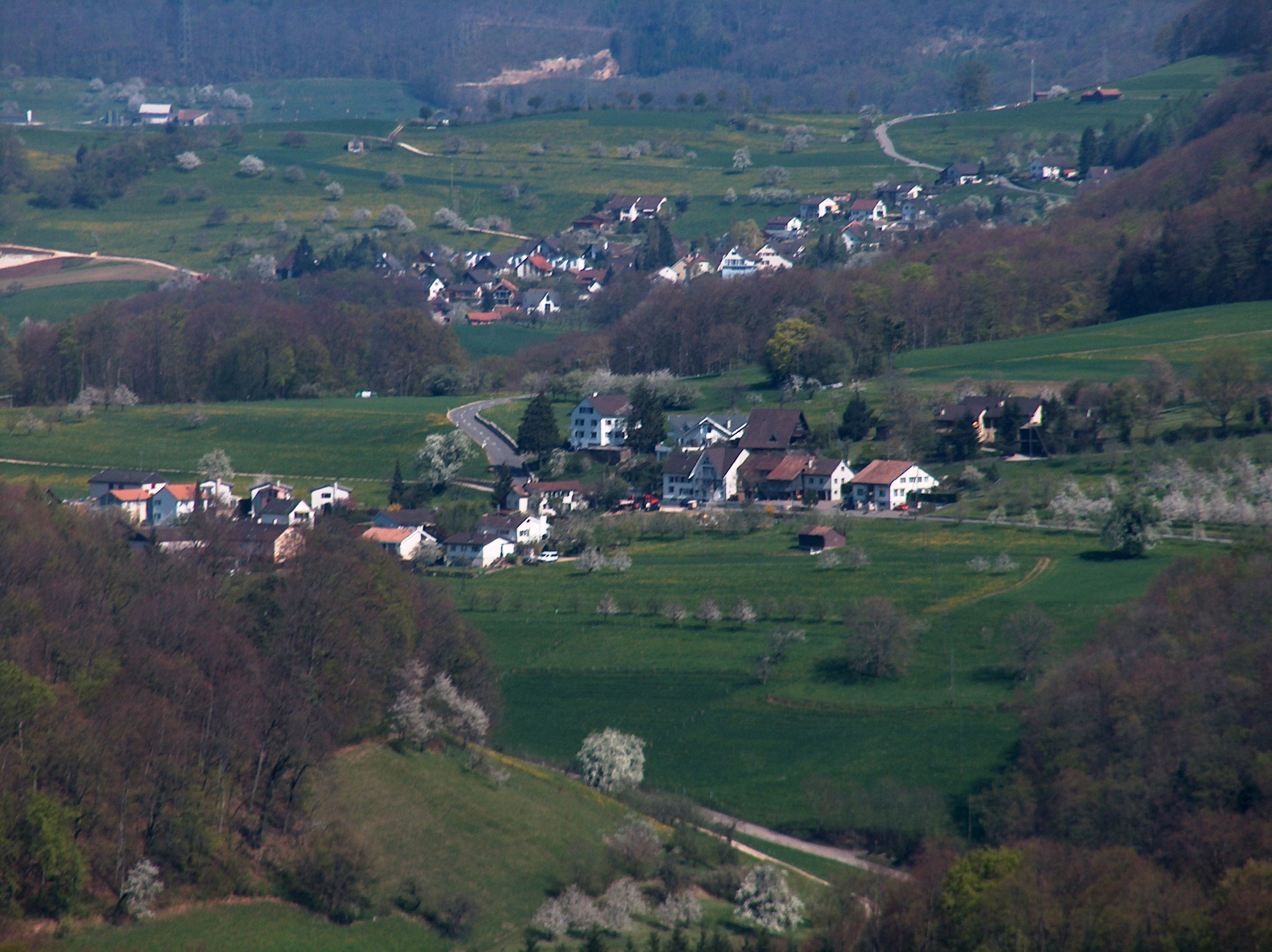

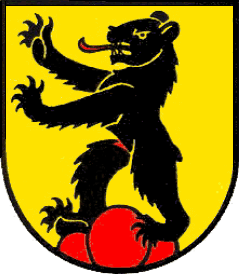
- Coat of arms
- Location of Arisdorf
- Location within Switzerland Location within Canton of Basel-Landschaft
- Coordinates: 47°31′N 7°46′E
- Country: Switzerland
- Canton: Basel-Landschaft
- District: Liestal

Area
  - Total: 10.0 km^{2} (3.9 sq mi)
- Elevation: 345 m (1,132 ft)

Population (June 2021)
  - Total: 1,714
  - Density: 171/km^{2} (444/sq mi)
- Time zone: UTC+01:00 (CET)
  - Summer (DST): UTC+02:00 (CEST)
- Postal code: 4422
- SFOS number: 2821
- ISO 3166 code: CH-BL
- Surrounded by: Füllinsdorf, Giebenach, Hersberg, Liestal, Magden (AG), Olsberg (AG)
- Website: arisdorf.ch

Arisdorf is a municipality in the district of Liestal in the canton of Basel-Country in Switzerland.

== History ==
Arisdorf is first mentioned in 1154 as Arnolstorf.

== Geography ==
Aerial view (1954)

Arisdorf has an area, as of 2009, of 10 square kilometers (3.9 sq mi). Of this area, 5.63 km^{2} (2.17 sq mi) or 56.3% is used for agricultural purposes, while 3.41 km^{2} (1.32 sq mi) or 34.1% is forested. Of the rest of the land, 0.94 km^{2} (0.36 sq mi) or 9.4% is settled (buildings or roads) and 0.01 km^{2} (2.5 acres) or 0.1% is unproductive land.

Of the built up area, housing and buildings made up 4.0% and transportation infrastructure made up 4.3%. Out of the forested land, 32.9% of the total land area is heavily forested and 1.2% is covered with orchards or small clusters of trees. Of the agricultural land, 22.7% is used for growing crops and 26.7% is pastures, while 6.9% is used for orchards or vine crops.

The municipality is located in the Liestal district, in a valley in the Jura Mountains. It consists of the village of Arisdorf which is made up of the sections; Ober-, Mittel- and Unterdorf, as well as scattered individual houses.

== Coat of arms ==
The blazon of the municipal coat of arms is Or, a Bear rampant Sable langued and vilené Gules on Coupeaux of the last.

== Demographics ==
Arisdorf has a population (as of June 2021) of 1,714. As of 2008, 6.6% of the population are resident foreign nationals. Over the last 10 years (1997–2007) the population has changed at a rate of 14.6%.

Most of the population (as of 2000) speaks German (1,264 or 92.9%), with English being second most common (27 or 2.0%) and French being third (15 or 1.1%).

As of 2008, the gender distribution of the population was 48.4% male and 51.6% female. The population was made up of 1,451 Swiss citizens (91.9% of the population), and 128 non-Swiss residents (8.1%) Of the population in the municipality 396 or about 29.1% were born in Arisdorf and lived there in 2000. There were 332 or 24.4% who were born in the same canton, while 407 or 29.9% were born somewhere else in Switzerland, and 175 or 12.9% were born outside of Switzerland.

In 2008 there were 7 live births to Swiss citizens and were 4 deaths of Swiss citizens. Ignoring immigration and emigration, the population of Swiss citizens increased by 3 while the foreign population remained the same. There were 2 Swiss men and 1 Swiss woman who immigrated back to Switzerland. At the same time, there were 6 non-Swiss men and 3 non-Swiss women who immigrated from another country to Switzerland. The total Swiss population change in 2008 (from all sources, including moves across municipal borders) was an increase of 23 and the non-Swiss population change was a decrease of 4 people. This represents a population growth rate of 1.3%.

The age distribution, as of 2010, in Arisdorf is; 109 children or 6.9% of the population are between 0 and 6 years old and 257 teenagers or 16.3% are between 7 and 19. Of the adult population, 153 people or 9.7% of the population are between 20 and 29 years old. 171 people or 10.8% are between 30 and 39, 286 people or 18.1% are between 40 and 49, and 337 people or 21.3% are between 50 and 64. The senior population distribution is 206 people or 13.0% of the population are between 65 and 79 years old and there are 60 people or 3.8% who are over 80.

As of 2000, there were 506 people who were single and never married in the municipality. There were 711 married individuals, 70 widows or widowers and 73 individuals who are divorced.

As of 2000, there were 538 private households in the municipality, and an average of 2.5 persons per household. There were 112 households that consist of only one person and 41 households with five or more people. Out of a total of 547 households that answered this question, 20.5% were households made up of just one person and 8 were adults who lived with their parents. Of the rest of the households, there are 201 married couples without children, 181 married couples with children There were 31 single parents with a child or children. There were 5 households that were made up unrelated people and 9 households that were made some sort of institution or another collective housing.

In 2000 there were 294 single family homes (or 70.7% of the total) out of a total of 416 inhabited buildings. There were 43 multi-family buildings (10.3%), along with 64 multi-purpose buildings that were mostly used for housing (15.4%) and 15 other use buildings (commercial or industrial) that also had some housing (3.6%). Of the single family homes 42 were built before 1919, while 58 were built between 1990 and 2000. The greatest number of single family homes (92) were built between 1971 and 1980.

In 2000 there were 564 apartments in the municipality. The most common apartment size was 5 rooms of which there were 172. There were 5 single room apartments and 298 apartments with five or more rooms. Of these apartments, a total of 519 apartments (92.0% of the total) were permanently occupied, while 37 apartments (6.6%) were seasonally occupied and 8 apartments (1.4%) were empty. As of 2007, the construction rate of new housing units was 6.7 new units per 1000 residents. As of 2000 the average price to rent a two-room apartment was about 987.00 CHF (US$790, £440, €630), a three-room apartment was about 1274.00 CHF (US$1020, £570, €820) and a four-room apartment cost an average of 1649.00 CHF (US$1320, £740, €1060). The vacancy rate for the municipality, in 2008, was 0%.

The historical population is given in the following chart:

== Sights ==
The entire village of Arisdorf is designated as part of the Inventory of Swiss Heritage Sites.

== Politics ==
In the 2007 federal election the most popular party was the SVP which received 42.57% of the vote. The next three most popular parties were the FDP (18.47%), the SP (17.01%) and the Green Party (11.35%). In the federal election, a total of 543 votes were cast, and the voter turnout was 49.3%.

== Economy ==
As of 2007, Arisdorf had an unemployment rate of 1.2%. As of 2005, there were 105 people employed in the primary economic sector and about 32 businesses involved in this sector. 243 people were employed in the secondary sector and there were 18 businesses in this sector. 240 people were employed in the tertiary sector, with 50 businesses in this sector. There were 722 residents of the municipality who were employed in some capacity, of which females made up 43.2% of the workforce.

In 2008 the total number of full-time equivalent jobs was 519. The number of jobs in the primary sector was 64, of which 60 were in agriculture and 4 were in forestry or lumber production. The number of jobs in the secondary sector was 254, of which 113 or (44.5%) were in manufacturing and 141 (55.5%) were in construction. The number of jobs in the tertiary sector was 201. In the tertiary sector; 60 or 29.9% were in wholesale or retail sales or the repair of motor vehicles, 16 or 8.0% were in the movement and storage of goods, 2 or 1.0% were in a hotel or restaurant, 10 or 5.0% were in the information industry, 3 or 1.5% were the insurance or financial industry, 70 or 34.8% were technical professionals or scientists, 11 or 5.5% were in education and 4 or 2.0% were in health care.

In 2000, there were 305 workers who commuted into the municipality and 524 workers who commuted away. The municipality is a net exporter of workers, with about 1.7 workers leaving the municipality for every one entering. About 12.5% of the workforce coming into Arisdorf are coming from outside Switzerland. Of the working population, 13.9% used public transportation to get to work, and 51.2% used a private car.

== Religion ==
From the 2000 census, 220 or 16.2% were Roman Catholic, while 841 or 61.8% belonged to the Swiss Reformed Church. Of the rest of the population, there were 19 members of an Orthodox church (or about 1.40% of the population), there were 2 individuals (or about 0.15% of the population) who belonged to the Christian Catholic Church, and there were 15 individuals (or about 1.10% of the population) who belonged to another Christian church. There were 18 (or about 1.32% of the population) who were Islamic. There were 3 individuals who were Buddhist. 180 (or about 13.24% of the population) belonged to no church, are agnostic or atheist, and 62 individuals (or about 4.56% of the population) did not answer the question.

== Weather ==
Arisdorf has an average of 137.4 days of rain or snow per year and on average receives 972 mm (38.3 in) of precipitation. The wettest month is August during which time Arisdorf receives an average of 112 mm (4.4 in) of rain or snow. During this month there is precipitation for an average of 12 days. The month with the most days of precipitation is May, with an average of 13.7, but with only 98 mm (3.9 in) of rain or snow. The driest month of the year is February with an average of 64 mm (2.5 in) of precipitation over 11 days.

== Education ==
In Arisdorf about 538 or (39.6%) of the population have completed non-mandatory upper secondary education, and 210 or (15.4%) have completed additional higher education (either university or a Fachhochschule). Of the 210 who completed tertiary schooling, 64.8% were Swiss men, 21.9% were Swiss women, 8.6% were non-Swiss men and 4.8% were non-Swiss women.

As of 2000, there were 9 students in Arisdorf who came from another municipality, while 64 residents attended schools outside the municipality.
