= Augst =

Place in Basel-Landschaft, Switzerland

- Municipality
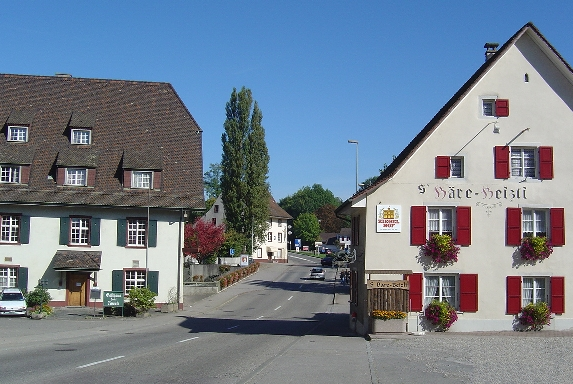

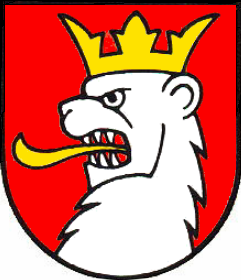
- Coat of arms
- Location of Augst
- Location within Switzerland Location within Canton of Basel-Landschaft
- Coordinates: 47°32′07″N 7°42′54″E
- Country: Switzerland
- Canton: Basel-Landschaft
- District: Liestal

Area
  - Total: 1.64 km^{2} (0.63 sq mi)
- Elevation: 275 m (902 ft)

Population (June 2021)
  - Total: 1,057
  - Density: 645/km^{2} (1,670/sq mi)
- Time zone: UTC+01:00 (CET)
  - Summer (DST): UTC+02:00 (CEST)
- Postal code: 4302
- SFOS number: 2822
- ISO 3166 code: CH-BL
- Surrounded by: Füllinsdorf, Giebenach, Grenzach-Wyhlen (DE-BW), Kaiseraugst (AG), Pratteln
- Website: augst.ch

Augst (Swiss German: Augscht) is a municipality in the district of Liestal in the canton of Basel-Country in Switzerland. It was known as Augusta Raurica in Roman times.

== History ==
Augst is first mentioned in 615 as Augustodunensem praesulem. In 752 it was mentioned as Augusta and in 1288 as Augst.

== Geography ==
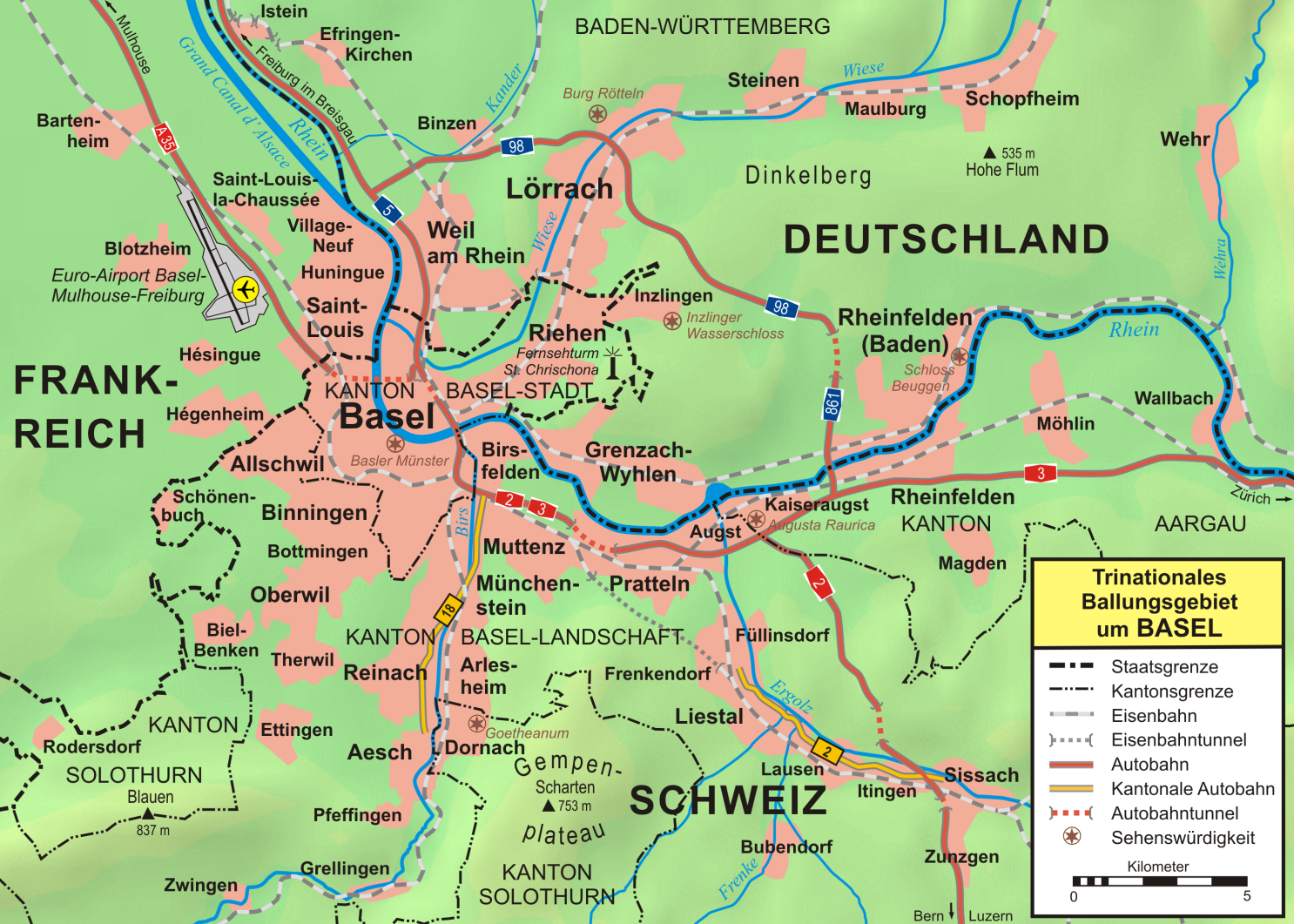
Map of Basel showing the location of Augst.

Aerial view from 500 m by Walter Mittelholzer (1925)

Augst has an area, as of 2009, of 1.64 square kilometers (0.63 sq mi). Of this area, 0.57 km^{2} (0.22 sq mi) or 34.8% is used for agricultural purposes, while 0.11 km^{2} (0.042 sq mi) or 6.7% is forested. Of the rest of the land, 0.66 km^{2} (0.25 sq mi) or 40.2% is settled (buildings or roads), 0.28 km^{2} (0.11 sq mi) or 17.1% is either rivers or lakes.

Of the built up area, industrial buildings made up 6.1% of the total area while housing and buildings made up 11.0% and transportation infrastructure constituted 15.9%. Power and water infrastructure as well as other special developed areas made up 1.8% of the area while parks, green belts and sports fields made up 5.5%. Out of the forested land, 4.9% of the total land area is heavily forested and 1.8% is covered with orchards or small clusters of trees. Of the agricultural land, 18.9% is used for growing crops and 14.6% is pasture-land, while 1.2% is used for orchards or vine crops. All the water in the municipality is flowing water.

The municipality is located in the Liestal district, near the mouth of the Ergolz river. It consists of the linear village of Augst.

== Coat of arms ==
The blazon of the municipal coat of arms is Gules, a Lion's head Argent issuant langued and crowned Or.

== Demographics ==
Augst has a population (as of June 2021) of 1,057. As of 2008, 16.7% of the population are resident foreign nationals. Over the last 10 years (1997–2007) the population has changed at a rate of 10.6%. Its population was comparable to its current level around 1910, or the early twentieth century.

Most of the population (as of 2000) speaks German (804 or 84.6%), with Italian language and Serbo-Croatian being second and third most common (28 or 2.9%). There are 17 people who speak French and 1 person who speaks Romansh.

As of 2008, the gender distribution of the population was 49.4% male and 50.6% female. The population was made up of 736 Swiss citizens (82.5% of the population), and 156 non-Swiss residents (17.5%) Of the population in the municipality 195 or about 20.5% were born in Augst and lived there in 2000. There were 187 or 19.7% who were born in the same canton, while 324 or 34.1% were born somewhere else in Switzerland, and 217 or 22.8% were born outside Switzerland.

In 2008 there were 2 live births to Swiss citizens and 3 births to non-Swiss citizens, and in same time span there were 5 deaths of Swiss citizens and 1 non-Swiss citizen death. Ignoring immigration and emigration, the population of Swiss citizens decreased by 3 while the foreign population increased by 2. There were 8 Swiss men and 2 Swiss women who emigrated from Switzerland. At the same time, there were 11 non-Swiss men and 4 non-Swiss women who immigrated from another country to Switzerland. The total Swiss population change in 2008 (from all sources, including moves across municipal borders) was a decrease of 7 and the non-Swiss population remained the same. This represents a population growth rate of -0.8%.

The age distribution, as of 2010, in Augst is; 33 children or 3.7% of the population are between 0 and 6 years old and 89 teenagers or 10.0% are between 7 and 19. Of the adult population, 89 people or 10.0% of the population are between 20 and 29 years old. 94 people or 10.5% are between 30 and 39, 151 people or 16.9% are between 40 and 49, and 231 people or 25.9% are between 50 and 64. The senior population distribution is 143 people or 16.0% of the population are between 65 and 79 years old and there are 62 people or 7.0% who are over 80.

As of 2000, there were 350 people who were single and never married in the municipality. There were 514 married individuals, 44 widows or widowers and 42 individuals who are divorced.

As of 2000, there were 407 private households in the municipality, and an average of 2.3 persons per household. There were 122 households that consist of only one person and 25 households with five or more people. Out of a total of 417 households that answered this question, 29.3% were households made up of just one person and 2 were adults who lived with their parents. Of the rest of the households, there are 151 married couples without children, 109 married couples with children There were 16 single parents with a child or children. There were 7 households that were made up unrelated people and 10 households that were made some sort of institution or another collective housing.

In 2000 there were 123 single family homes (or 58.6% of the total) out of a total of 210 inhabited buildings. There were 47 multi-family buildings (22.4%), along with 17 multi-purpose buildings that were mostly used for housing (8.1%) and 23 other use buildings (commercial or industrial) that also had some housing (11.0%). Of the single family homes 17 were built before 1919, while 9 were built between 1990 and 2000. The greatest number of single family homes (33) were built between 1946 and 1960.

In 2000 there were 454 apartments in the municipality. The most common apartment size was 4 rooms of which there were 144. There were 20 single room apartments and 134 apartments with five or more rooms. Of these apartments, a total of 391 apartments (86.1% of the total) were permanently occupied, while 43 apartments (9.5%) were seasonally occupied and 20 apartments (4.4%) were empty. As of 2007, the construction rate of new housing units was 0 new units per 1000 residents. As of 2000 the average price to rent a two-room apartment was about 808.00 CHF (US$650, £360, €520), a three-room apartment was about 978.00 CHF (US$780, £440, €630) and a four-room apartment cost an average of 1231.00 CHF (US$980, £550, €790). The vacancy rate for the municipality, in 2008, was 0.22%.

The historical population is given in the following chart:

== Heritage sites of national significance ==
The Roman city of Augusta Raurica and museum and the Villa Clavel auf Castelen are listed as Swiss heritage site of national significance. The entire Augusta Raurica site is part of the Inventory of Swiss Heritage Sites.

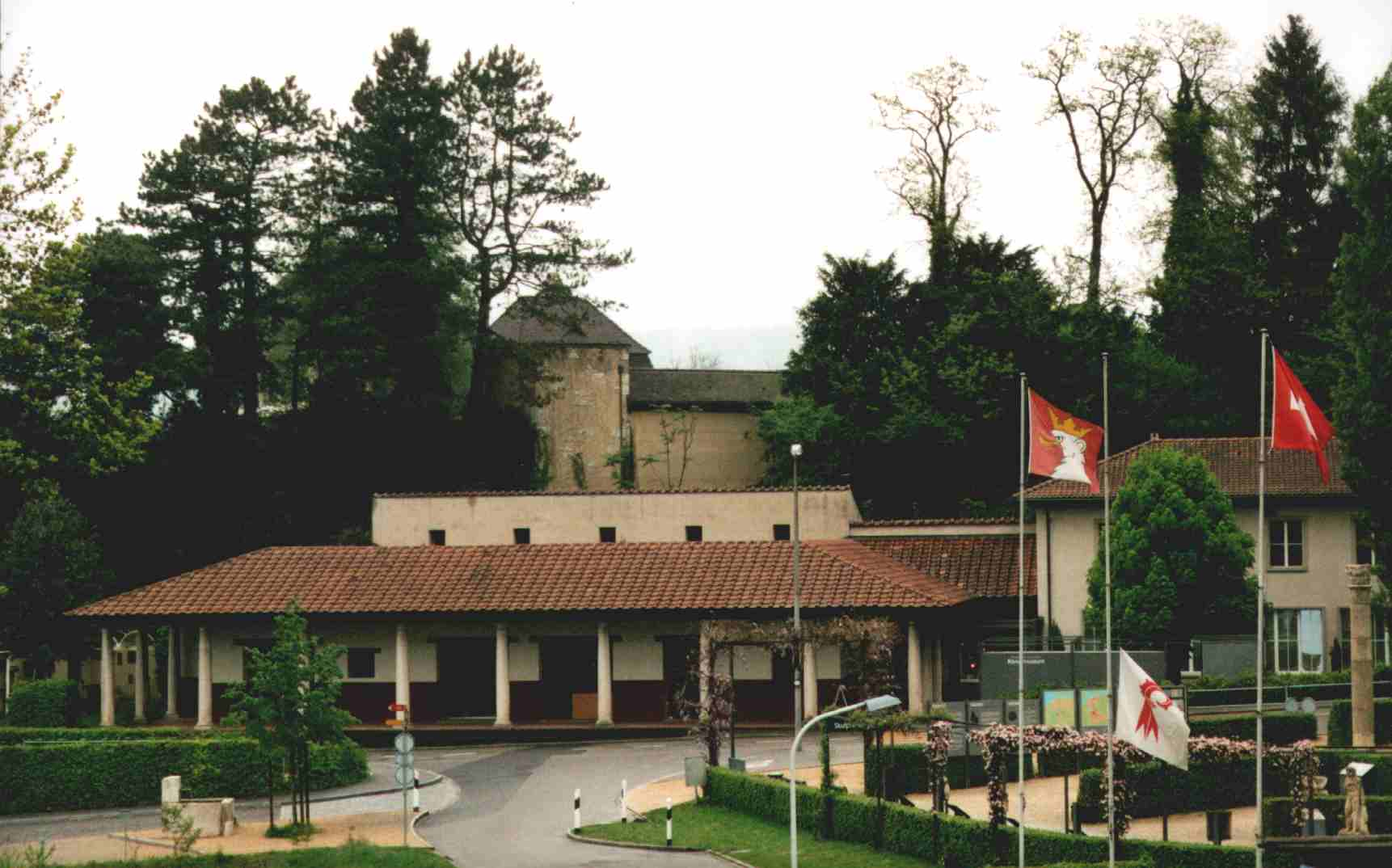
Augusta Raurica Museum

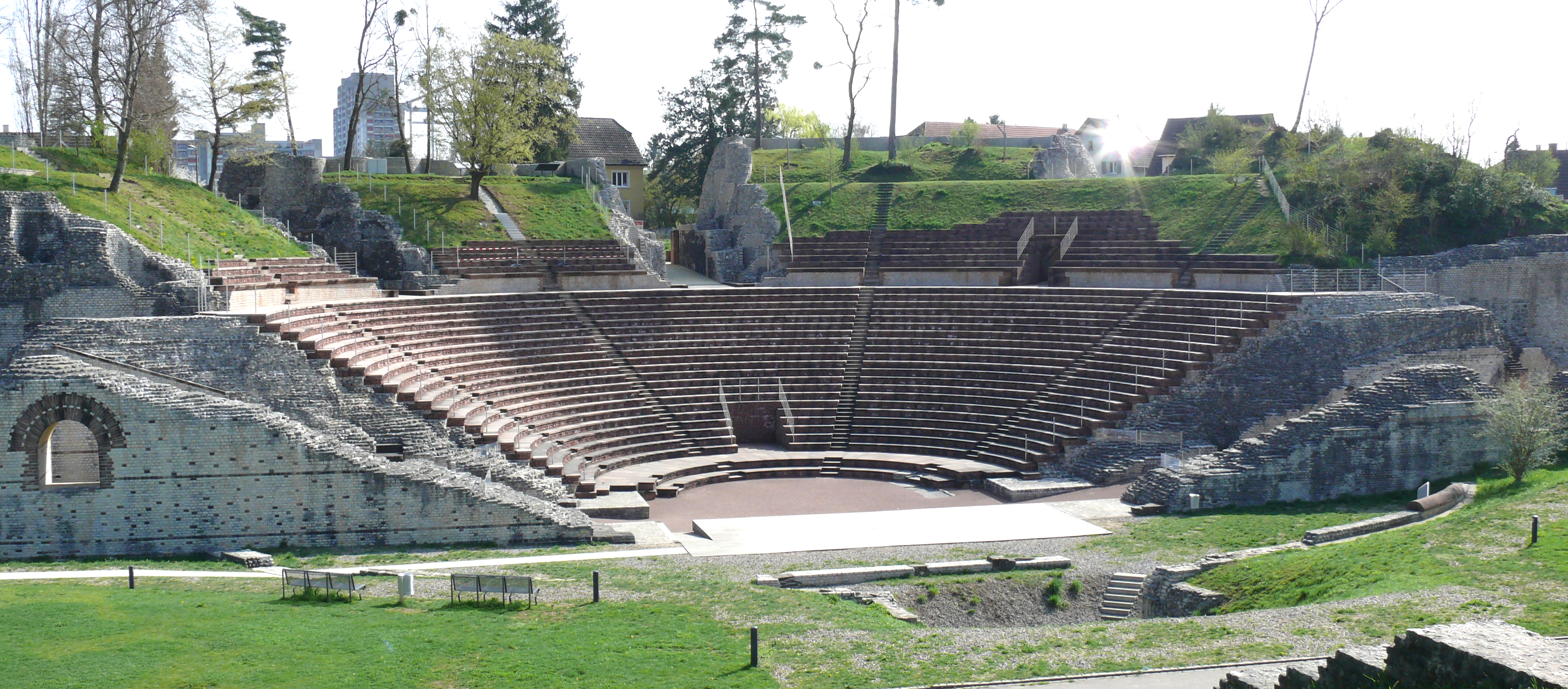
Augusta Raurica theater

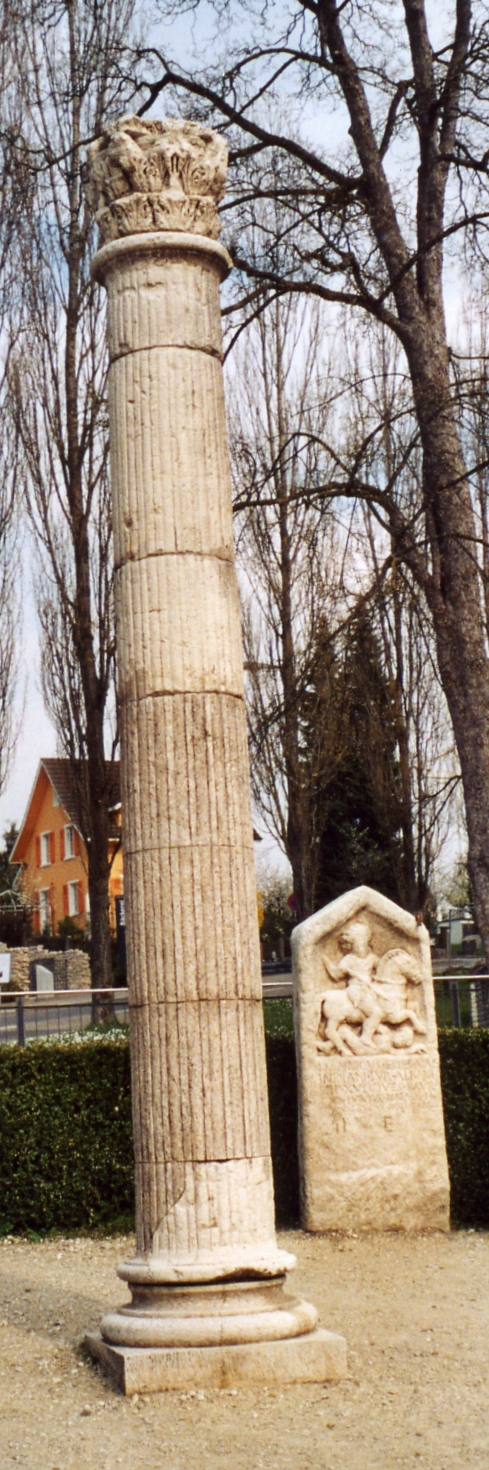
Roman era columns

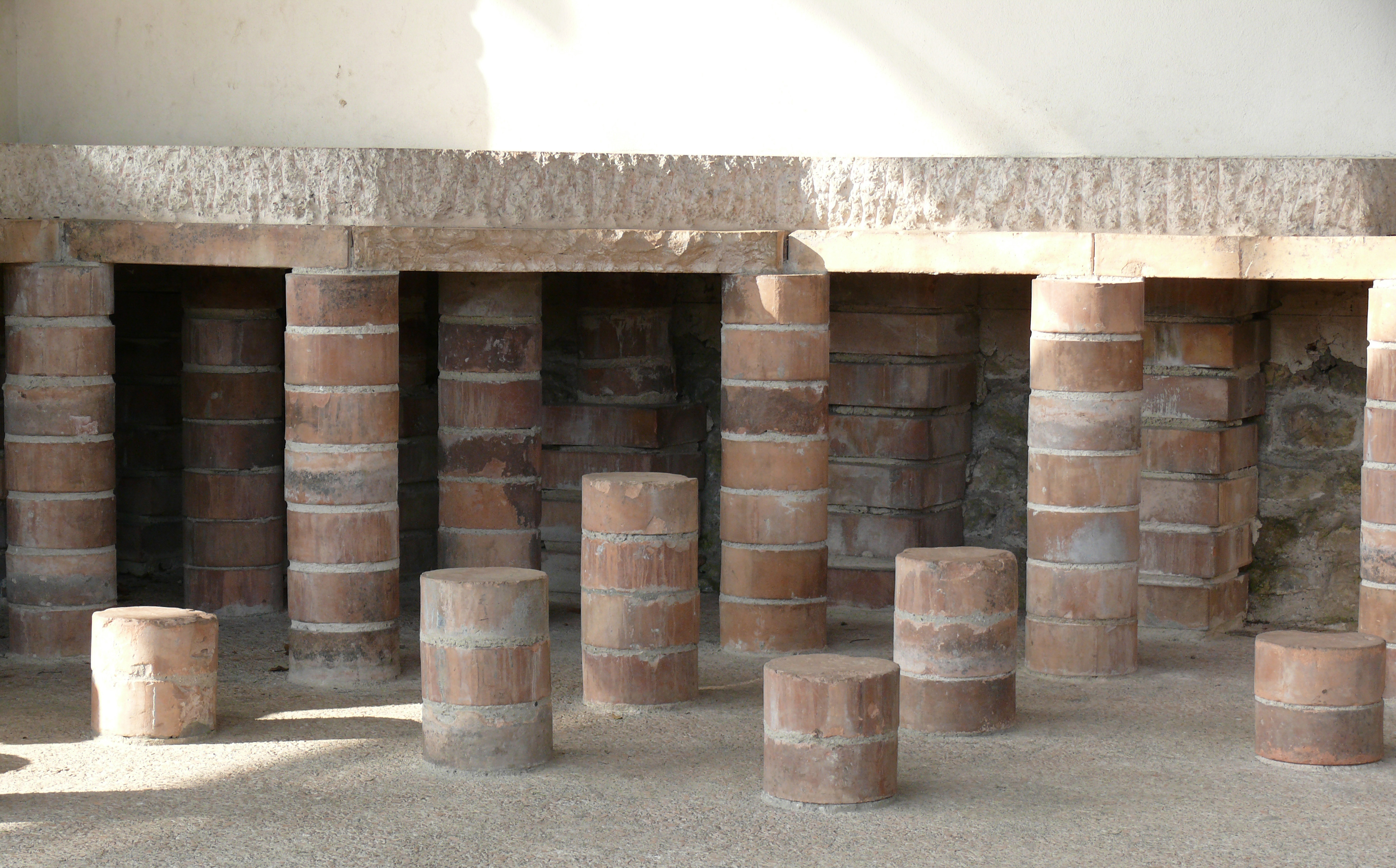
Reconstruction of the Hypocaust

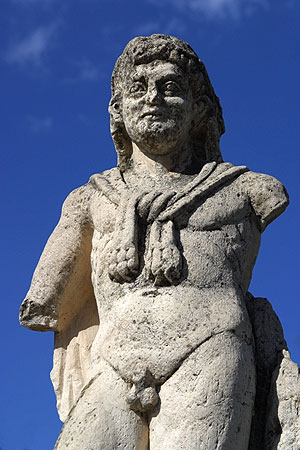
Statue at Augusta Raurica

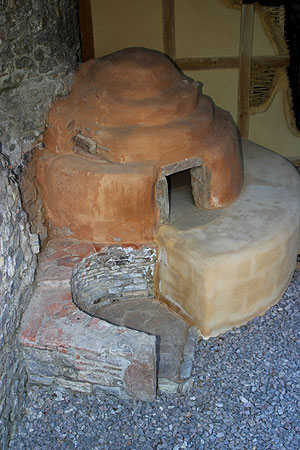
Backery Oven

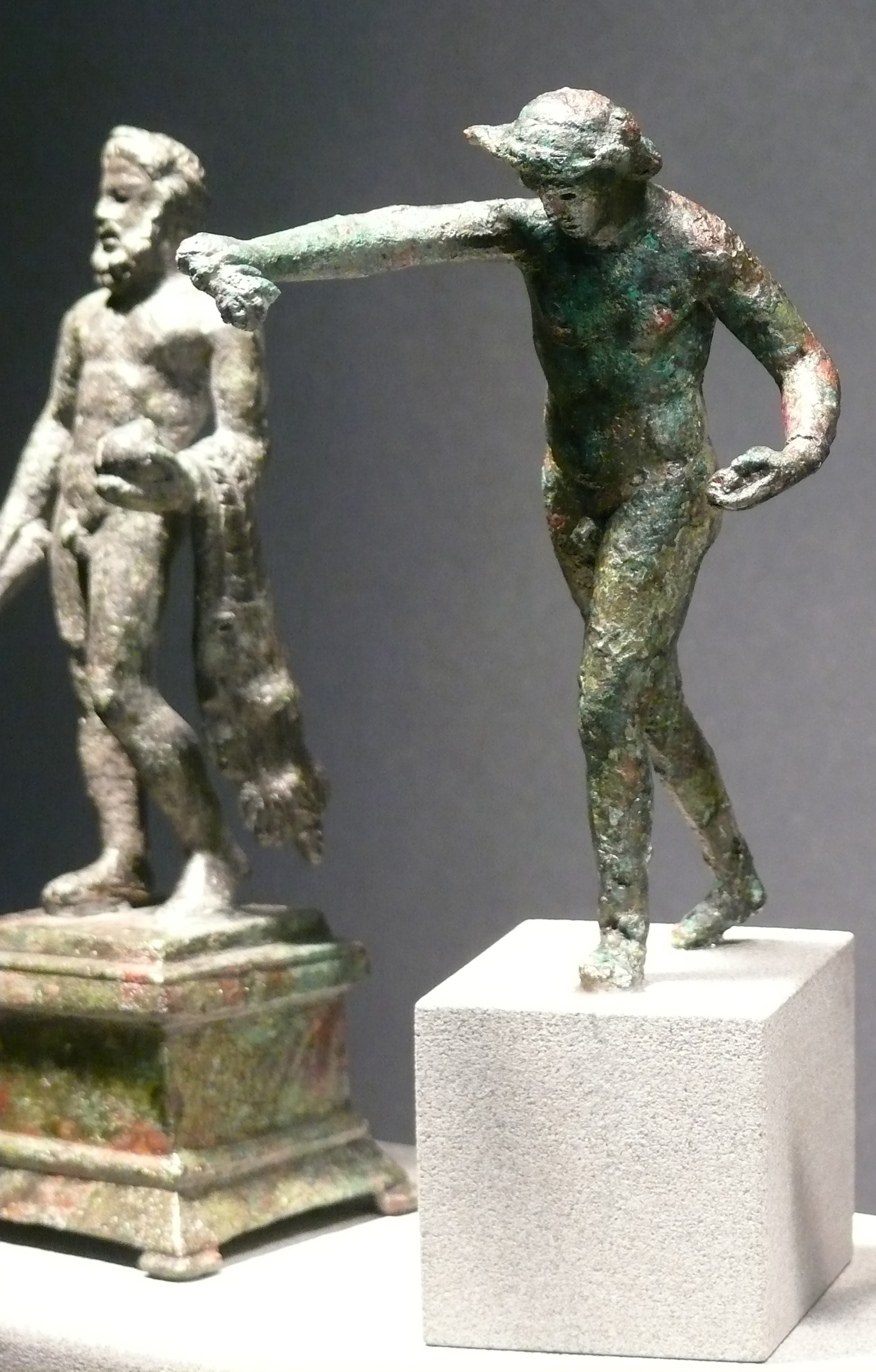
Statues at the Roman Museum

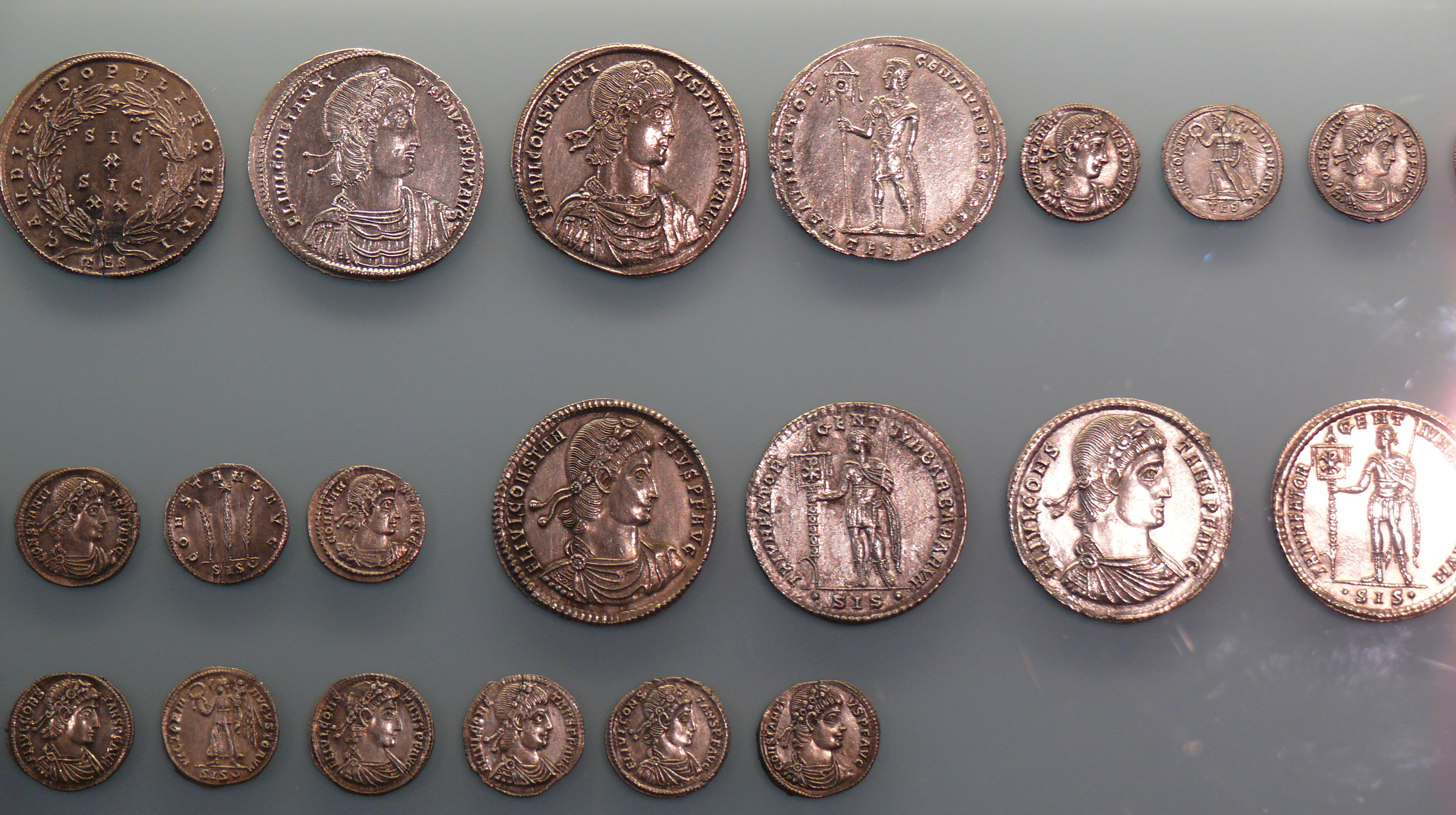
Roman coins at the Roman Museum

== Politics ==
In the 2007 federal election the most popular party was the SVP which received 37.22% of the vote. The next three most popular parties were the SP (24.48%), the FDP (13.47%) and the CVP (10.91%). In the federal election, a total of 296 votes were cast, and the voter turnout was 45.5%.

== Economy ==
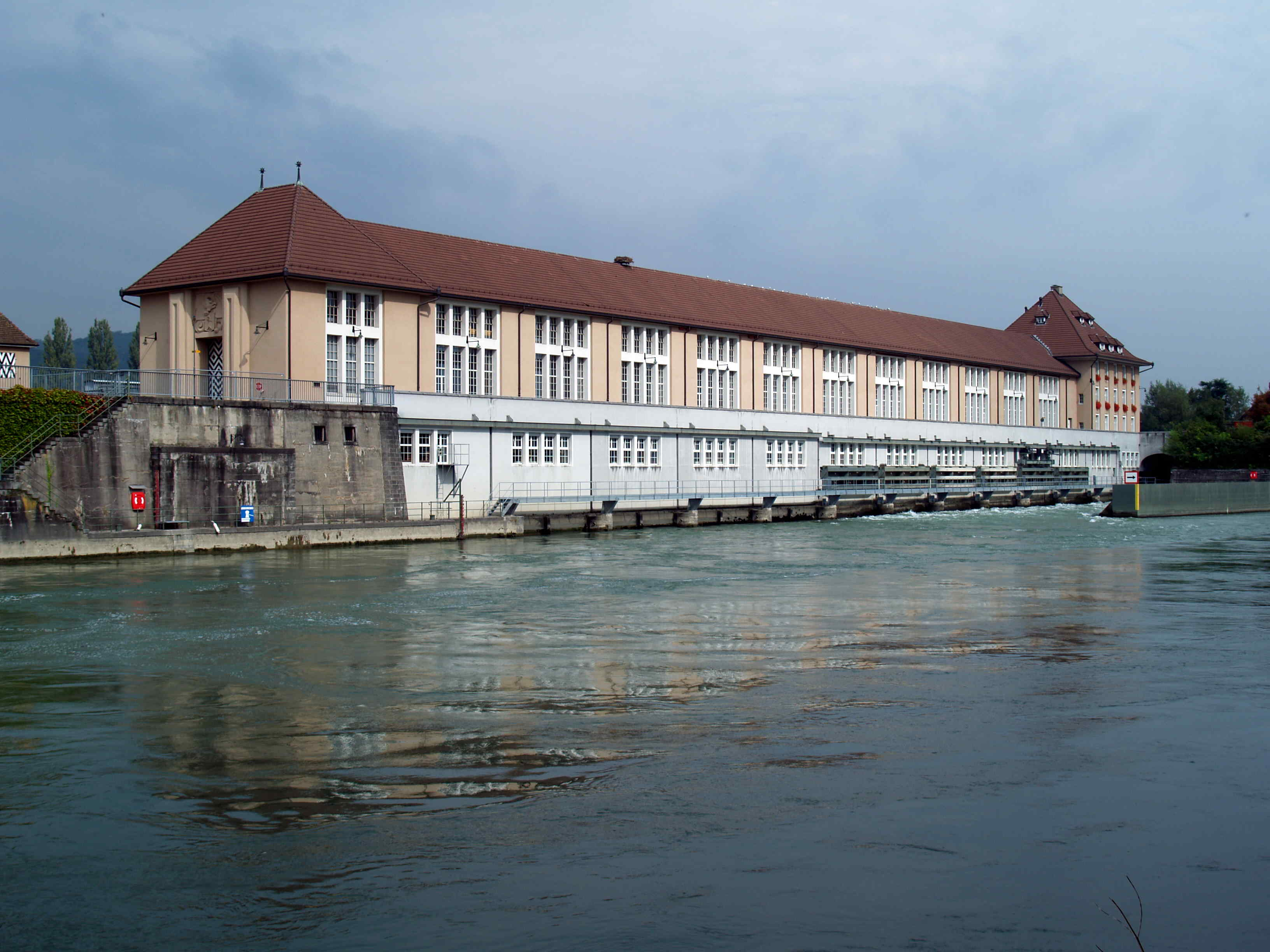
Part of the Augst/Wyhlen power plant

As of 2007, Augst had an unemployment rate of 2.4%. As of 2005, there were 25 people employed in the primary economic sector and about 6 businesses involved in this sector. 271 people were employed in the secondary sector and there were 21 businesses in this sector. 186 people were employed in the tertiary sector, with 36 businesses in this sector. There were 512 residents of the municipality who were employed in some capacity, of which females made up 45.3% of the workforce.

In 2008 the total number of full-time equivalent jobs was 716. The number of jobs in the primary sector was 15, all of which were in agriculture. The number of jobs in the secondary sector was 547, of which 105 or (19.2%) were in manufacturing and 431 (78.8%) were in construction. The number of jobs in the tertiary sector was 154. In the tertiary sector; 25 or 16.2% were in wholesale or retail sales or the repair of motor vehicles, 7 or 4.5% were in the movement and storage of goods, 36 or 23.4% were in a hotel or restaurant, 9 or 5.8% were technical professionals or scientists, 6 or 3.9% were in education and 3 or 1.9% were in health care.

In 2000, there were 575 workers who commuted into the municipality and 387 workers who commuted away. The municipality is a net importer of workers, with about 1.5 workers entering the municipality for every one leaving. About 20.5% of the workforce coming into Augst are coming from outside Switzerland. Of the working population, 24.2% used public transportation to get to work, and 38.5% used a private car.

== Religion ==
From the 2000 census, 242 or 25.5% were Roman Catholic, while 413 or 43.5% belonged to the Swiss Reformed Church. Of the rest of the population, there were 37 members of an Orthodox church (or about 3.89% of the population), there were 5 individuals (or about 0.53% of the population) who belonged to the Christian Catholic Church, and there were 18 individuals (or about 1.89% of the population) who belonged to another Christian church. There were 45 (or about 4.74% of the population) who were Islamic. There were 8 individuals who were Buddhist, 9 individuals who were Hindu and 3 individuals who belonged to another church. 136 (or about 14.32% of the population) belonged to no church, are agnostic or atheist, and 34 individuals (or about 3.58% of the population) did not answer the question.

== Education ==
In Augst about 389 or (40.9%) of the population have completed non-mandatory upper secondary education, and 116 or (12.2%) have completed additional higher education (either university or a Fachhochschule). Of the 116 who completed tertiary schooling, 66.4% were Swiss men, 16.4% were Swiss women, 8.6% were non-Swiss men and 8.6% were non-Swiss women.

As of 2000, there were 64 students from Augst who attended schools outside the municipality.

== Transportation ==
The municipality is located on the A3 motorway.
