= Alt-Schauenburg Castle =

Castle in Frenkendorf, Switzerland

- Ruine Alt-Schauenburg
- Chleiflüeli, Frenkendorf
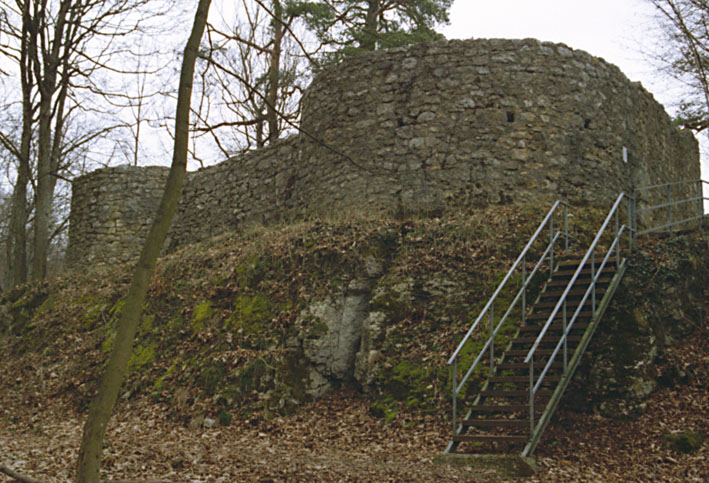
- Alt-Schauenburg from the south, shield wall and entrance

Site information
- Type: hill castle, spur castle
- Code: CH-BL
- Condition: Preserved walls

Location
- Coordinates: 47°29′44.0″N 7°40′23.7″E
- Height: 640 m above the sea

Site history
- Built: 1275/1280
- Materials: Stone

Alt-Schauenburg is a ruined castle in the commune of Frenkendorf, Switzerland. It is located near the border of France and Germany, and little of the castle remains because of geological events.

== History ==
There were two Schauenburg castles near Frenkendorf, Alt (or Old)-Schauenburg about 1 km (0.62 mi) southwest of the village on the top of Chleiflüeli hill and Neu (or New)-Schauenburg to the west. Alt-Schauenburg was probably built around 1275 as the seat of a junior branch of the Schauenburg family. The castle was occupied for less than a century. The 1356 Basel earthquake destroyed much of the castle and shortly thereafter the ruins were abandoned. The ruins were gradually buried, until 1949-50 when they were excavated and repaired. In 1976-77 additional construction helped preserve the site.

== Origin of the name ==
Neu-Schauenburg was built before Alt-Schauenburg, but because Alt-Schauenburg was destroyed and abandoned first, it came to be known as the old or alt- castle.

== Castle site ==
Many of the walls are still standing following the two conservation projects. The southern approach was guarded by a shield wall. One corner of the wall was protected by a semi-circular avant-corps. Inside the shield wall, the castle tower and residence hall were rectangular.

== See also ==
- List of castles in Switzerland
