= Augusta Raurica =

Archaeological site and museum in Switzerland

- Colonia Augusta Rauracorum
- The Roman theatre in Augusta Raurica

- Location within Switzerland
- 47°32′2″N 7°43′17″E
- Type: Settlement
- Periods: Roman Republic to Roman Empire
- Location: Augst, Basel-Landschaft, Switzerland
- Region: Germania Superior

History
- Built: Around 44 BC
- Built by: Lucius Munatius Plancus
- Abandoned: Around 260 AD

Site notes
- Website: augustaraurica.ch

Augusta Raurica is a Roman archaeological site and an open-air museum in Switzerland located on the south bank of the Rhine river about 20 km east of Basel near the villages of Augst and Kaiseraugst. It is the site of the oldest known Roman colony on the Rhine.

== Founding ==
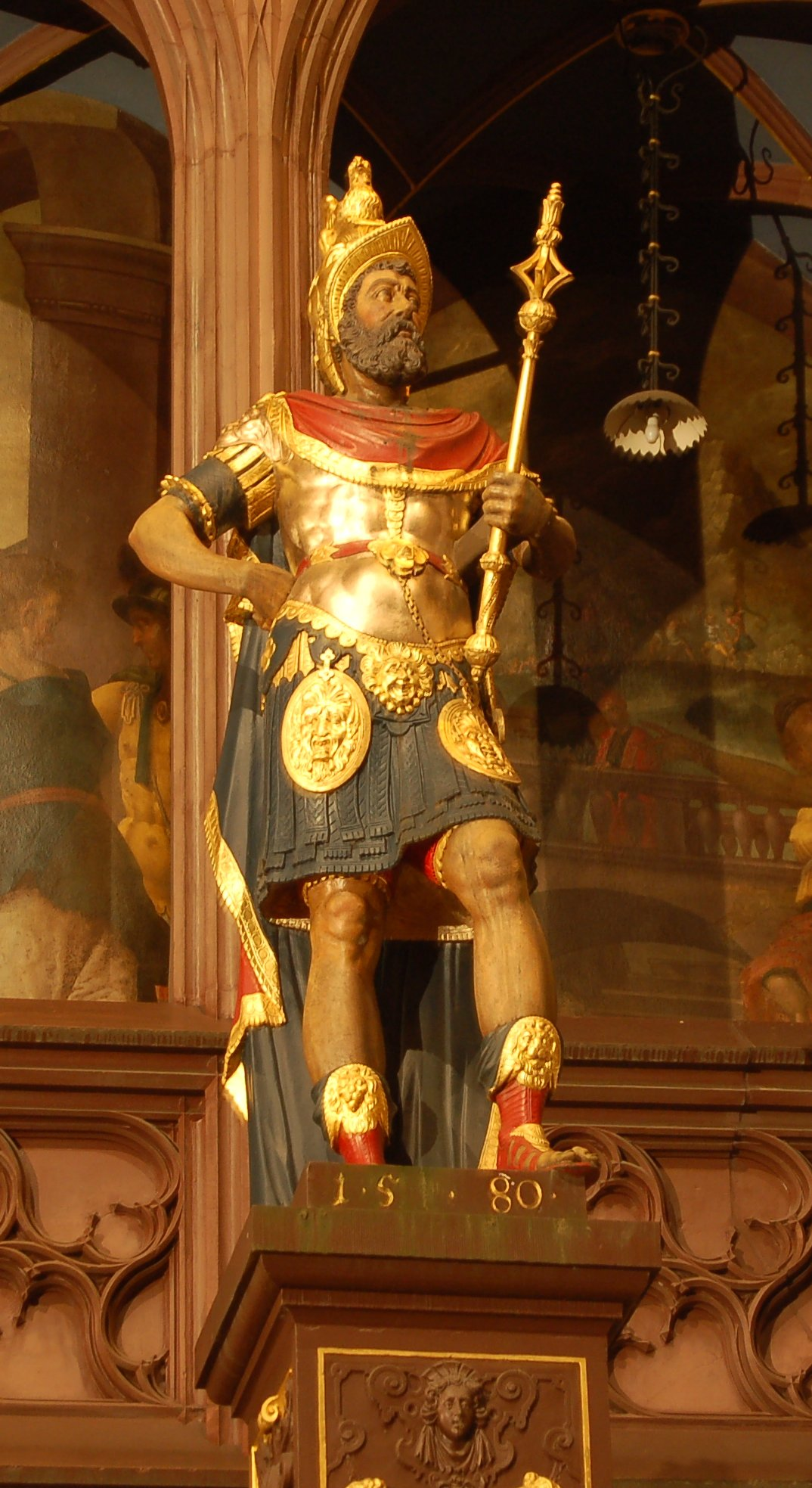
A statue of Plancus, the city's founder, in the city hall of Basel, Switzerland.

Augusta Raurica, or Colonia Augusta Rauracorum, was founded by Lucius Munatius Plancus around 44 BC in the vicinity of a local Gallic tribe, the Rauraci, relatives of the Helvetii. No archaeological evidence from this period has yet been found, leading to the conclusion that, either the settlement of the colony was disturbed by the civil war following the death of Julius Caesar, or that Plancus' colony was actually in the area of modern Basel, not Augst.

Successful colonization of the site had to wait for Augustus' conquest of the central Alps around 15 BC. The oldest find to date at Augusta Raurica has been dated to 6 BC by dendrochronology.

== Name ==
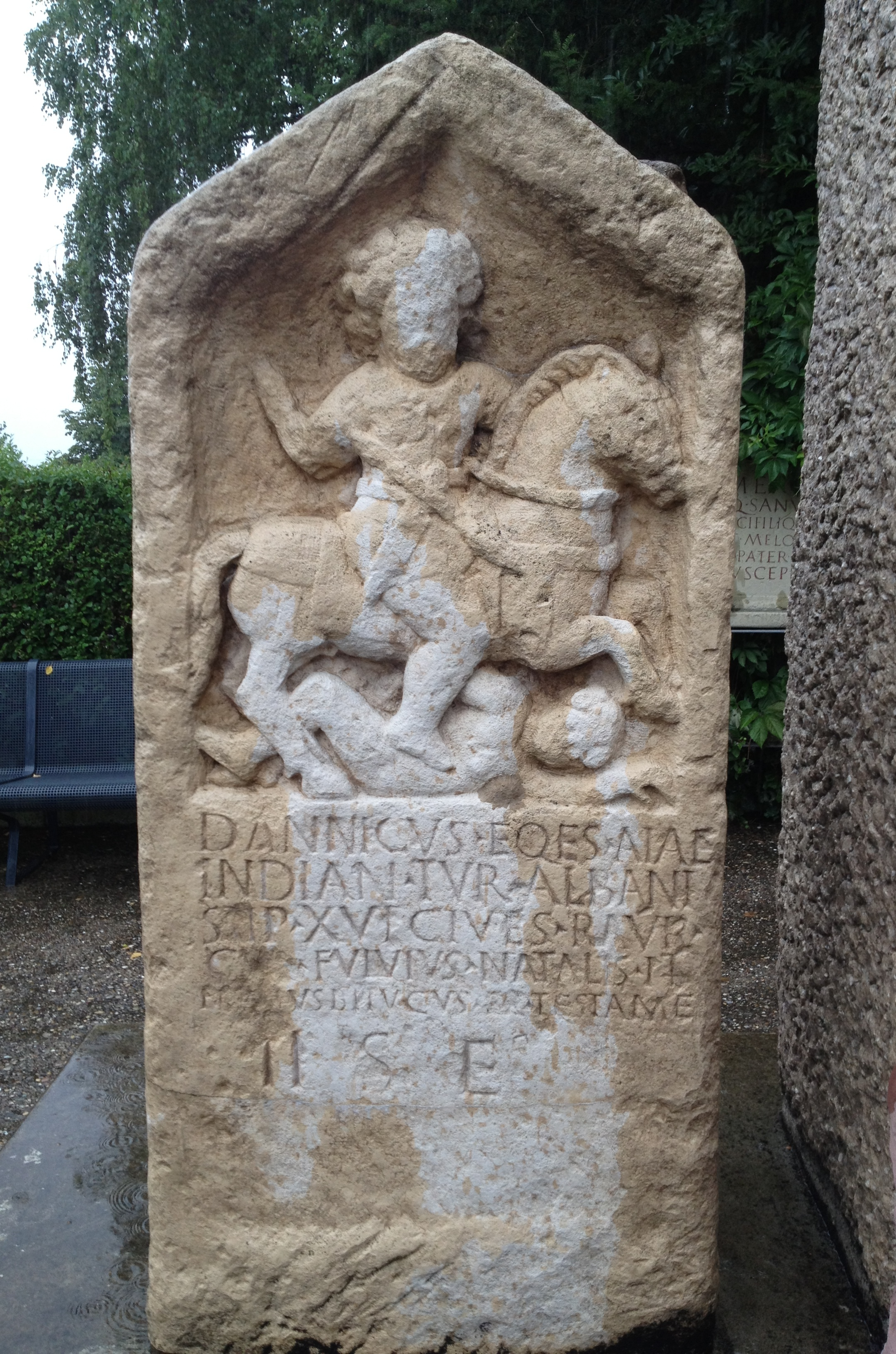
Gravestone from Cirencester for a civis Rauricus.

The inscription on Munatius Plancus' grave merely states the name of the colony as Colonia Raurica. A fragmentary inscription from the Augustinian period speaks of the Colonia P[aterna] (?) M[unatia] (?) [Felix] (?) [Apolli]naris [Augusta E]merita [Raur]ica (letters in brackets are reconstructions). Apart from this fragmentary reference, the first certain witness to the use of the name Augustus comes from the geographer Ptolemy in the Ancient Greek form Augústa Rauríkon (lat. Augusta Rauricorum).

Augusta Raurica played an important role in Augustus' plans of conquest with two other colonies that bear his name: Augusta Praetoria (modern Aosta at the southern end of the Great Saint Bernard Pass) and Augusta Vindelicum (modern Augsburg, an outpost on the Danube). These three Augustae form the corners of a triangle that reaches across the alpine conquests of Augustus, the long base of which form the Rhine knee to the Danube formed the frontier against unconquered Germania.

== Layout of the settlement ==
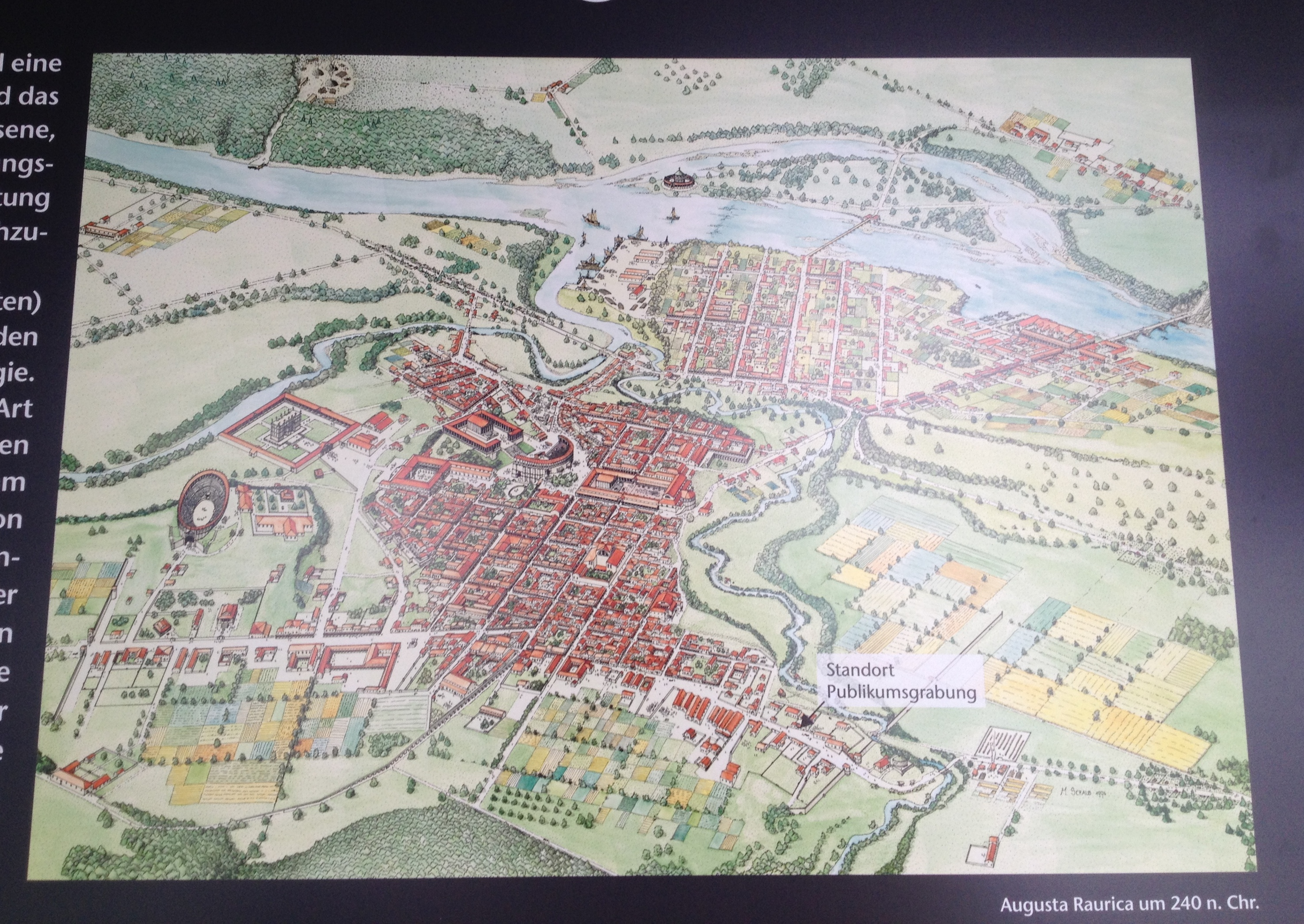
Augusta Raurica around 240 AD

During excavations it was determined that the city was founded on a high plateau just south of the Rhine river. Two small rivers, the Ergolz and Violen, have carved a triangle in the plateau, the base of which is about 1 kilometer wide along the base of the Jura Mountains, and the apex points northward toward the Rhine, about 1 kilometer from the base. This point is the site of the Roman castrum, or military fortification. The city is, therefore, well-defended by steep slopes to the north, east, and west.

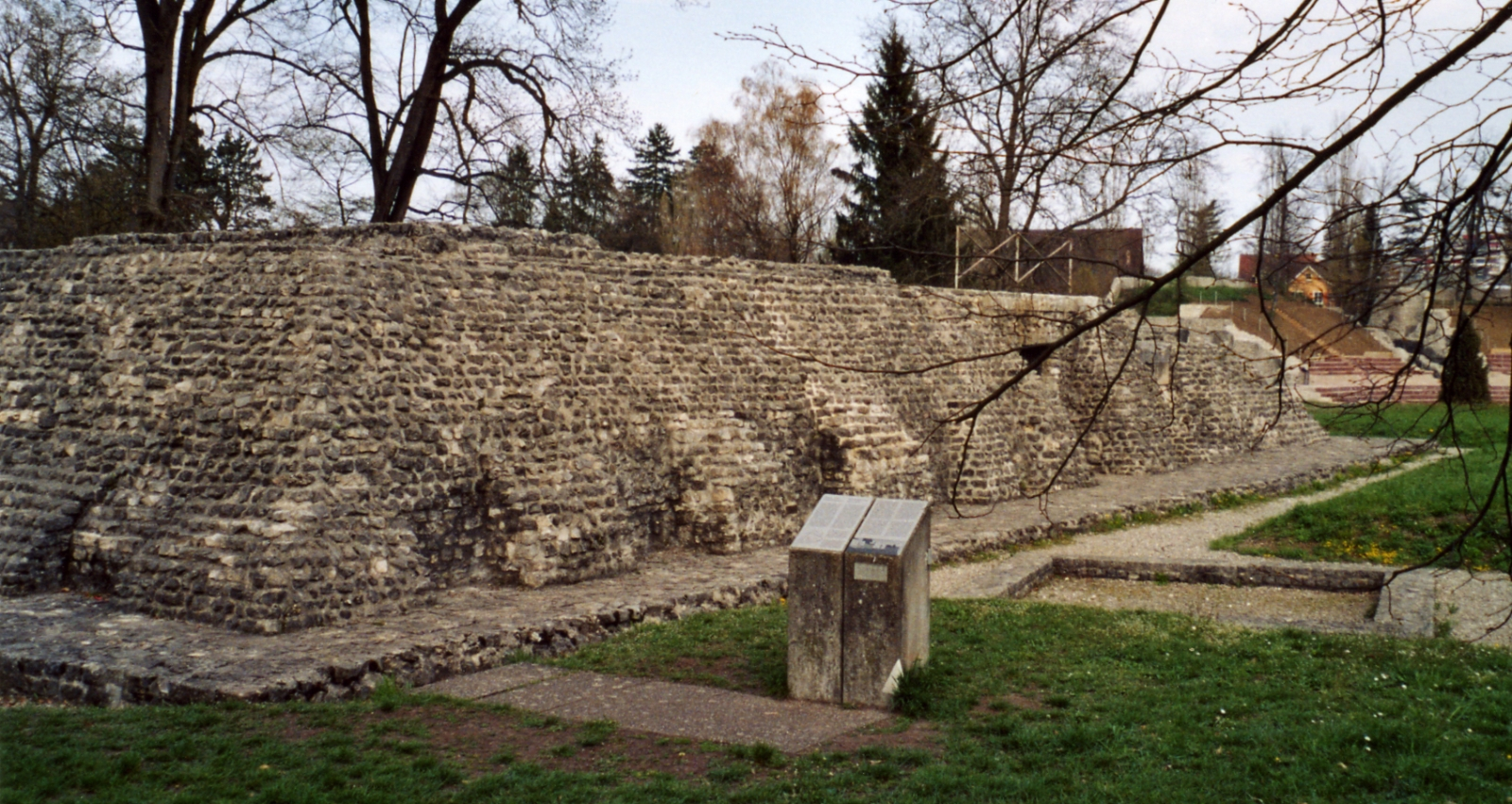
Temple at Augusta Raurica

The next step in planning the city was the surveying of the area according to the architect's plans for the city. Every important public building had its specific place, starting with the temple of Jupiter as the sacred high point from which the street network would spread. The architect, who was responsible for executing the plans for the city, next laid a longitudinal axis across the triangle 36˚ west of north to form the main street of the settlement. Other longitudinal streets were laid out parallel to the main street at intervals of 55 meters. The main street was then divided into sections of 66 meters (255 Roman feet), which formed the corners of 10 crossing streets. This created a series of rectangular blocks of around 50 by 60 meters. The streets were laid on a solid bed of gravel and flanked by gutters on both sides. The more important roads featured covered sidewalks behind rows of columns.

== Borders ==
Augusta Raurica and Vindonissa in the 4th century

The limits of Colonia Raurica can no longer be determined with absolute accuracy. However, the approximate boundaries can be established by examining the extent of Augst in the Early Middle Ages. This would seem to indicate the colony extended from Basel toward the mouth of the Aare, then up the Aare to the mouth of the Sigger below Solothurn, across to the Lüssel, and then back down the Birs to Basel, though this is still conjecture. New research, based on tiles stamped with the mark of the Vindonissa Legion, indicates some administrative dependence on Vindonissa. This would indicate that the colony reached over the Bözberg toward Frick, with the Thiersteinberg below Frick forming the eastern boundary. The western boundary, was near the mouth of the Birs, possibly marked by a border station. Early Roman cremation remains, found in 1937 by the church in Neuallschwil, show that such a post did exist on the main road north (toward Blotzheim) into Alsace. The Colonia Raurica, on the whole, contained the modern Canton of Basel, the Frick valley, and the eastern Jura Mountains of the Canton of Solothurn. The total area of the colony was around 700 km^{2}.

== Subsequent history ==
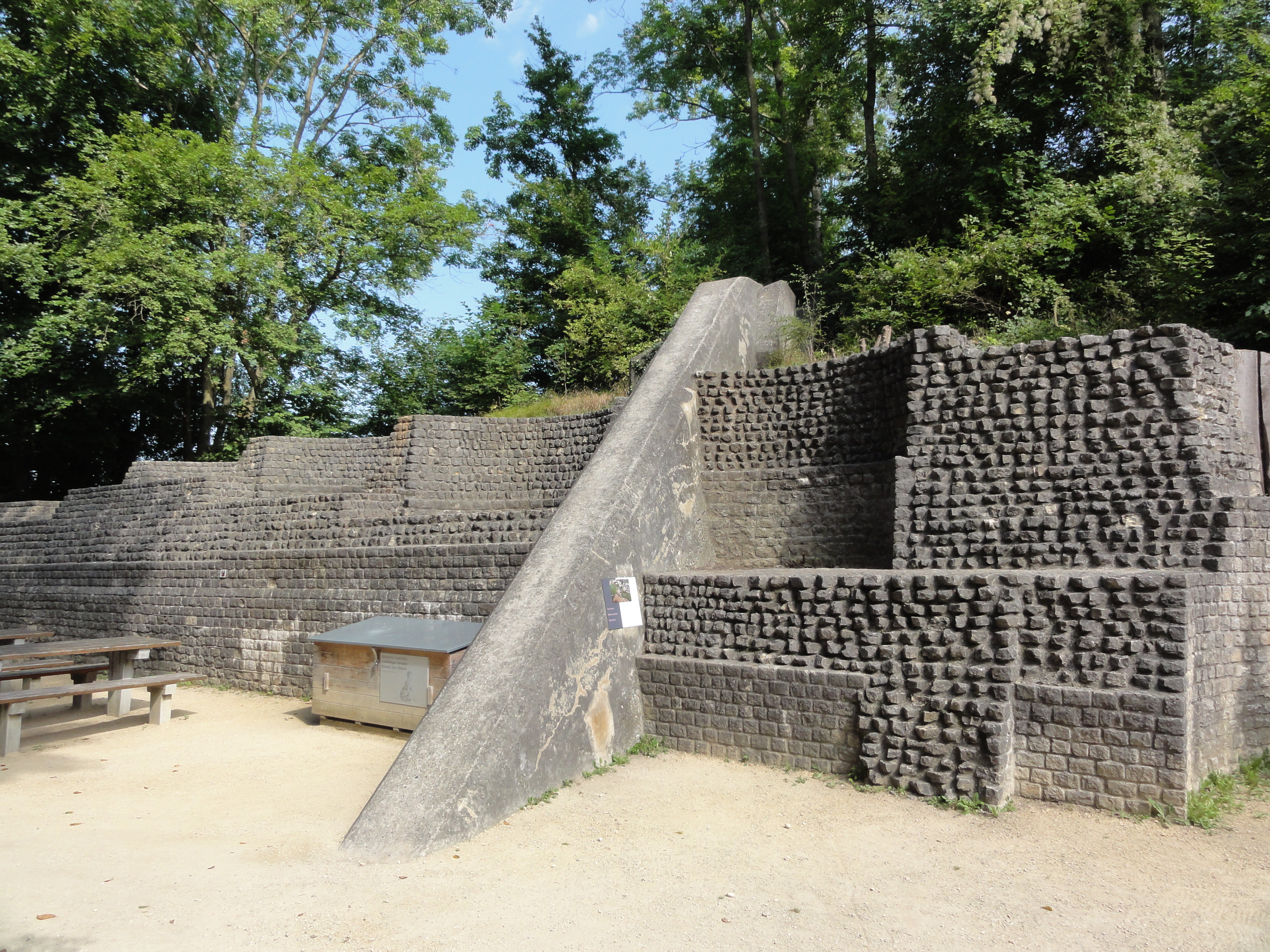
Remains of amphitheatre at Augusta Raurica

By the 2nd century AD, Augusta Raurica was a prosperous commercial trading centre and, in its glory days, the capital of a local Roman province. It is estimated that the population reached approximately 20,000 people. Augusta Raurica prospered between the 1st and 3rd centuries, and exported smoked pork and bacon to other parts of the Roman Empire. The city possessed the typical amenities of a Roman city, an amphitheatre, a main forum, several smaller forums, an aqueduct, a variety of temples, several public baths and the largest Roman theatre north of the Alps, with 8,000 to 10,000 seats. Many of these sites are open to visitors year-round.

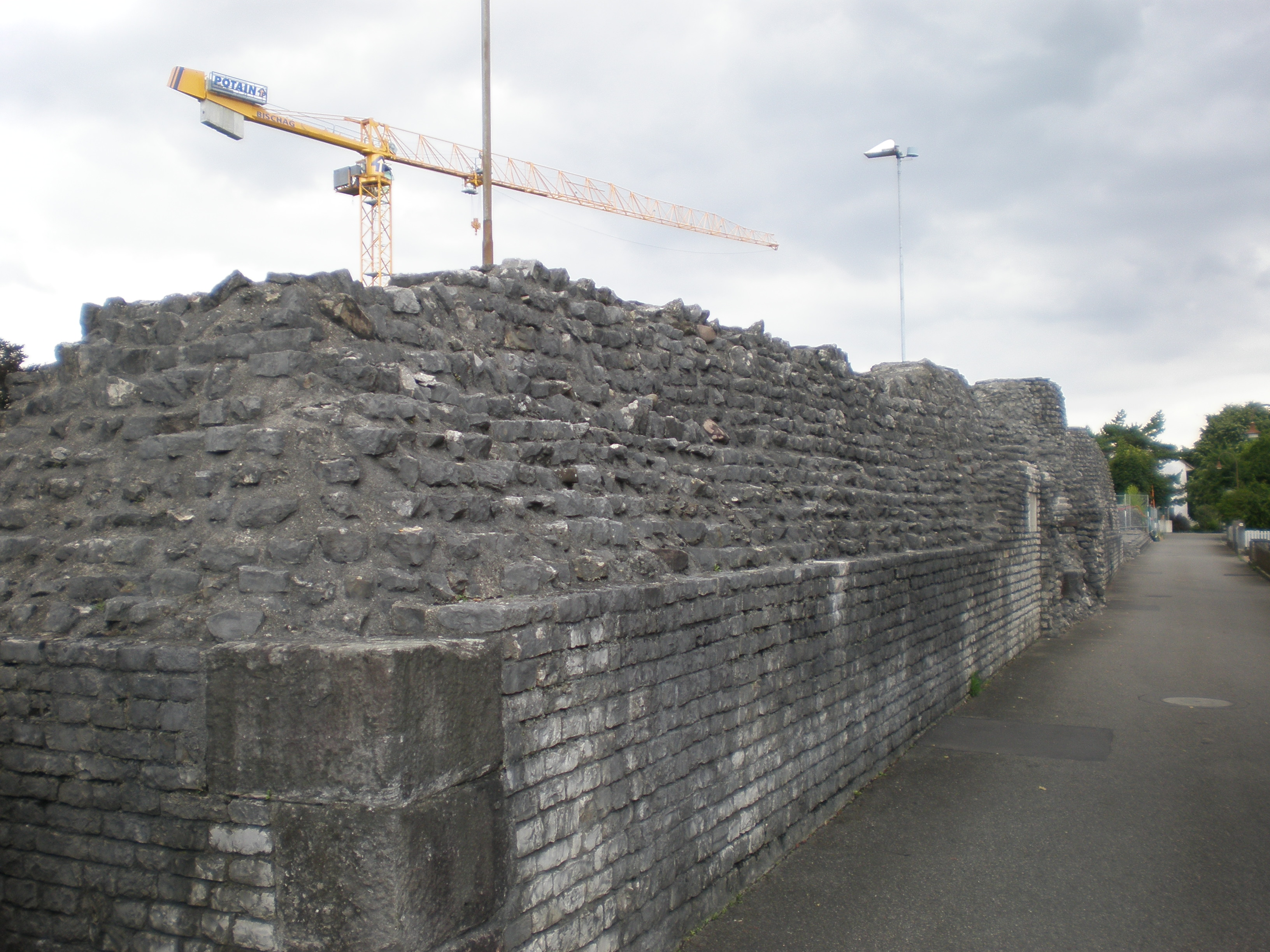
Castrum Rauracense

In 250 AD, a powerful earthquake damaged a large part of the city. Shortly after, around 260 AD, Alemanni tribes and/or marauding Roman troops destroyed the city. The Romans attempted to maintain their military position by building a fortress on the Rhine, Castrum Rauracense, the walls of which are still partly intact. Augusta Raurica was resettled on a much smaller scale on the site of the castrum. These two settlements form the centers of the modern communities of Augst and Kaiseraugst.

In 1442, these communities were divided along the Ergolz and Violenbach rivers. The western portion was given to Basel, which became a canton of Switzerland in 1501. From 1588, Basilius Amerbach, assisted by the painter Hans Bock, documented the rediscovery of the Roman settlement. In 1833, Augst became part of the Canton of Basel-Land. The eastern part became part of Habsburg territories and, to differentiate between the two towns, was renamed Kaiseraugst. Kaiseraugst became part of Switzerland in 1803 after the defeat of the Habsburgs during the Napoleonic Wars.

== Augusta Raurica today ==
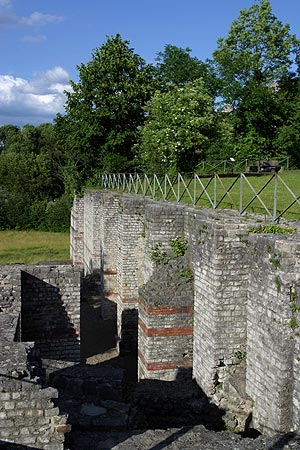
Basilica at Augusta Raurica

The excavation site and the late Roman castle, the Castrum Rauracense, are listed as heritage sites of national significance, as are the early Christian baptisterium and the brick kiln at Liebrüti.

=== Excavations ===
Many of the Roman buildings have been discovered and conserved through excavations, and most are open to the public:

- Amphitheatre: only modest remains exist.
- Aqueduct: supplied Augusta Raurica with drinking water from the Liestal (parts are visible and accessible in Heidenloch in Liestal, as well as northeast of the treatment plant in Füllinsdorf).
- Main forum: with the temple of Jupiter, basilica, and the assembly chamber of the town council.
- Theater: forms an architectural unit with the temple across the street.

Several private commercial buildings also have been found (a taberna, a bakery, a potter, and a tile kiln), as well as portions of a sewer. Around 80% of the built-up area has yet to be excavated. Augusta Raurica is the best-preserved Roman city north of the Alps that has not been built-over in medieval or modern times.

=== Museum and Roman house ===
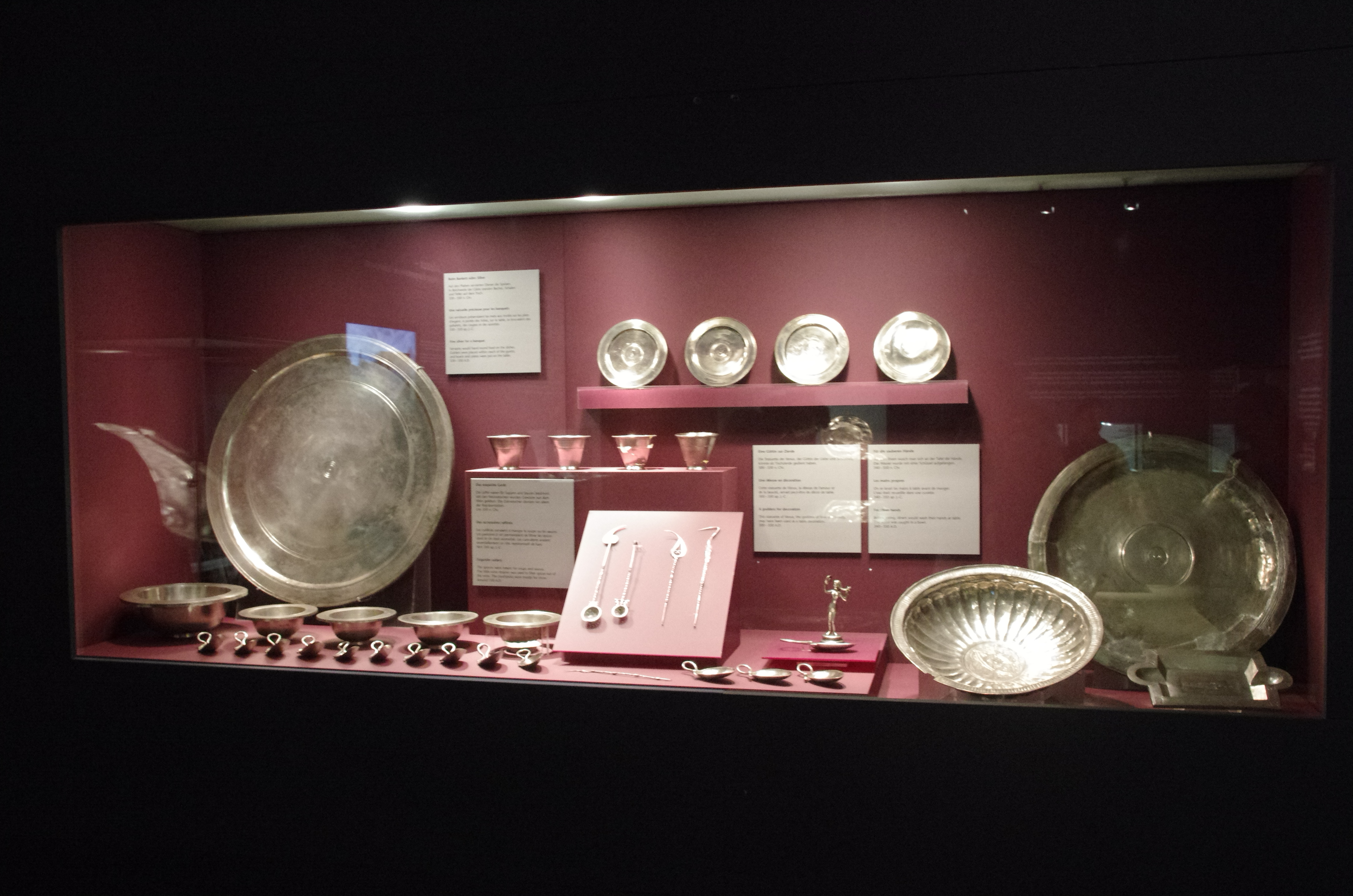
Silver treasure of Kaiseraugst

The Roman Museum houses the most important finds from the Roman city and presents the history of Augusta Raurica. In the museum, visitors will often find special exhibits, as well as the most significant archaeological find at Augusta Raurica: the silver treasure of Kaiseraugst. This treasure hoard was found in the fortress in 1961–1962, and it is presumed to have once been the property of a commander. The museum also has a reconstruction of a Roman house, with artifacts and reconstructions showing daily domestic and commercial life from the Roman period.

== Transport ==
The site is located some 750 m (2,460 ft) south of Kaiseraugst railway station, which is served by the half-hourly operating S1 service of Basel S-Bahn.

== See also ==
- Augusta Munatiana
- List of archaeological sites by country
- List of Roman sites
- List of museums in Switzerland
