= Neu-Schauenburg Castle =

Castle in Frenkendorf, Switzerland

- Ruine Neu-Schauenburg
- Frenkendorf
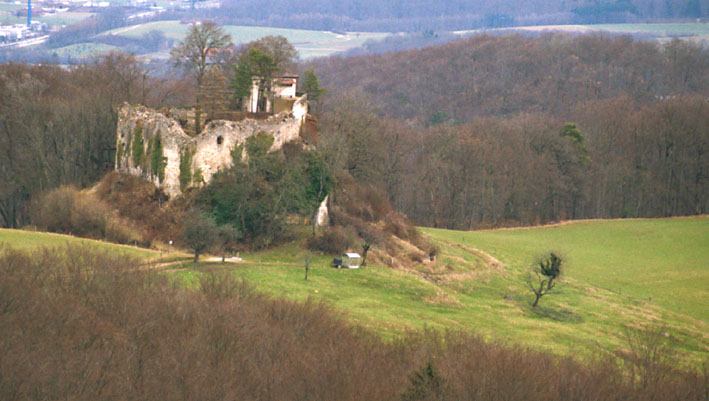
- Neu-Schauenburg from the south (2010)

Site information
- Type: Hill castle
- Code: CH-BL
- Condition: Ruins, Preserved Walls

Location
- Coordinates: 47°30′2.07″N 7°40′56.5″E
- Height: 600 m above the sea

Site history
- Built: 12th century (possible 11th century)
- Materials: Stone

Neu-Schauenburg is a ruined castle in the commune of Frenkendorf, Switzerland. It is located near the border of France and Germany, and little of the castle remains because of geological events.

== History ==
There were two Schauenburg castles near Frenkendorf, Alt (or Old)-Schauenburg about 1 km (0.62 mi) southwest of the village on the top of Chleiflüeli hill and Neu (or New)-Schauenburg to the west. A first castle was probably built for the Lords of Schauenburg in the 11th century, however nothing is known about it. In the 13th century the original castle was replaced by a new castle. The 1356 Basel earthquake destroyed much of it, but unlike Alt-Schauenburg, it was quickly rebuilt. The Schauenburg family became extinct in 1385 and the castle became a fief under the Bishop of Basel. In 1397 it was sold and then over the following centuries passed through several additional owners. However, by the 15th century, it had been abandoned and began to fall into ruin.

By 1480 a group of Beguines lay sisters had occupied the towers of Neu-Schauenburg and established a cloistered house in the ruins. The order remained at Schauenburg until 1523. In 1691 mineral springs were discovered and a bath house was built near the castle ruins. In 1792 a small country estate with attached fields was built near the ruins.

== Origin of the name ==
Neu-Schauenburg was built before Alt-Schauenburg, but because Alt-Schauenburg was destroyed and abandoned first, it came to be known as the old or alt- castle.

== Castle site ==
The castle was built on a rocky spur above the valley. It has an irregular floorplan and a gate on the north side with a 2 m (6.6 ft) thick castle wall that follows the edge of the spur. The top of the spur is divided down the center by a narrow band of rock into higher eastern and lower western halves.

== See also ==
- List of castles in Switzerland
