= Ergolz =

River in Switzerland

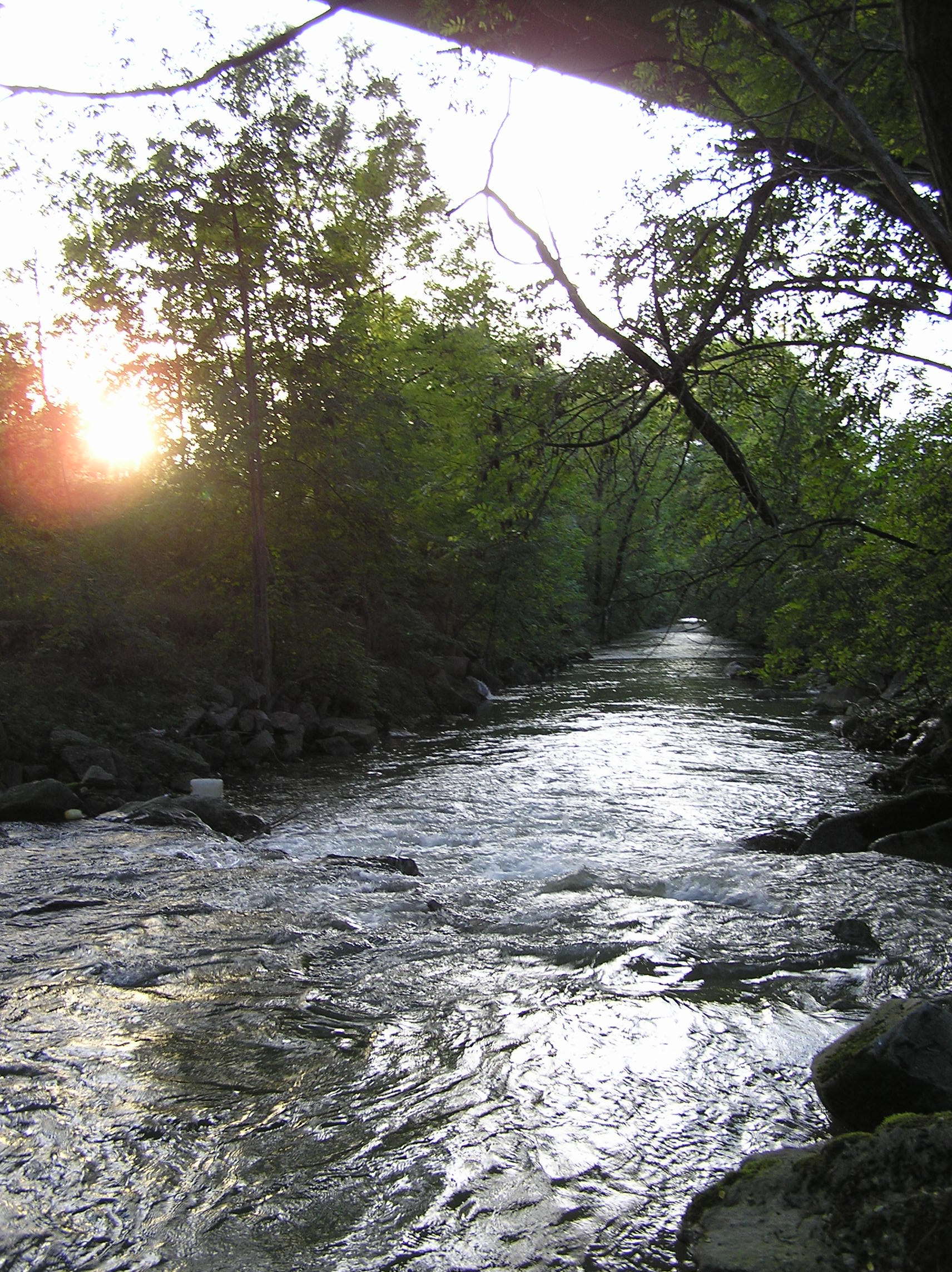
- The Ergolz at Sissach

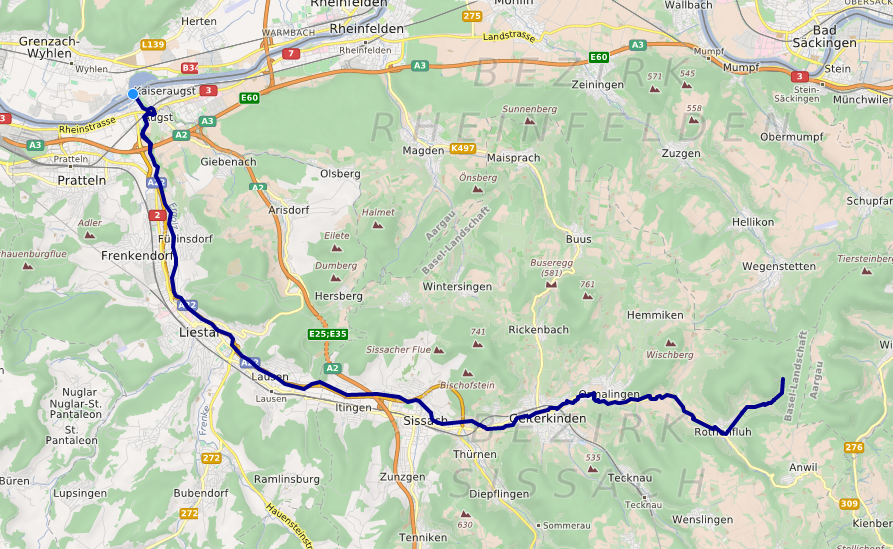

Location
- Country: Switzerland
- Location: Basel-Landschaft

Physical characteristics
- Source
  - location: Schafmatt, Greisflue, Rohr, Solothurn
  - coordinates: 47°25′26″N 7°57′34″E
  - elevation: 830 m (2,720 ft)
- Mouth
  - location: Confluence with Rhine between Augst and Kaiseraugst
  - coordinates: 47.53806°N 7.71386°E
- Basin size: 261 km^{2} (101 sq mi)
- Discharge
  - average: 3.73 m^{3}/s (132 cu ft/s)

Basin features
- Progression: Rhine→ North Sea

The Ergolz is the main river in the canton of Basel-Landschaft, Switzerland. It rises on Mount Geisflue in the Faltenjura mountains in the upper region of Basel-Landschaft, on the border with Aargau and Solothurn, and joins the Rhine at Augst. Among the tributaries of the Ergolz are Eibach, Homburgerbach, Diegterbach, Frenke (Anterior and Posterior Frenke), Orisbach, Röserenbach and Violenbach.

== Numerical data ==
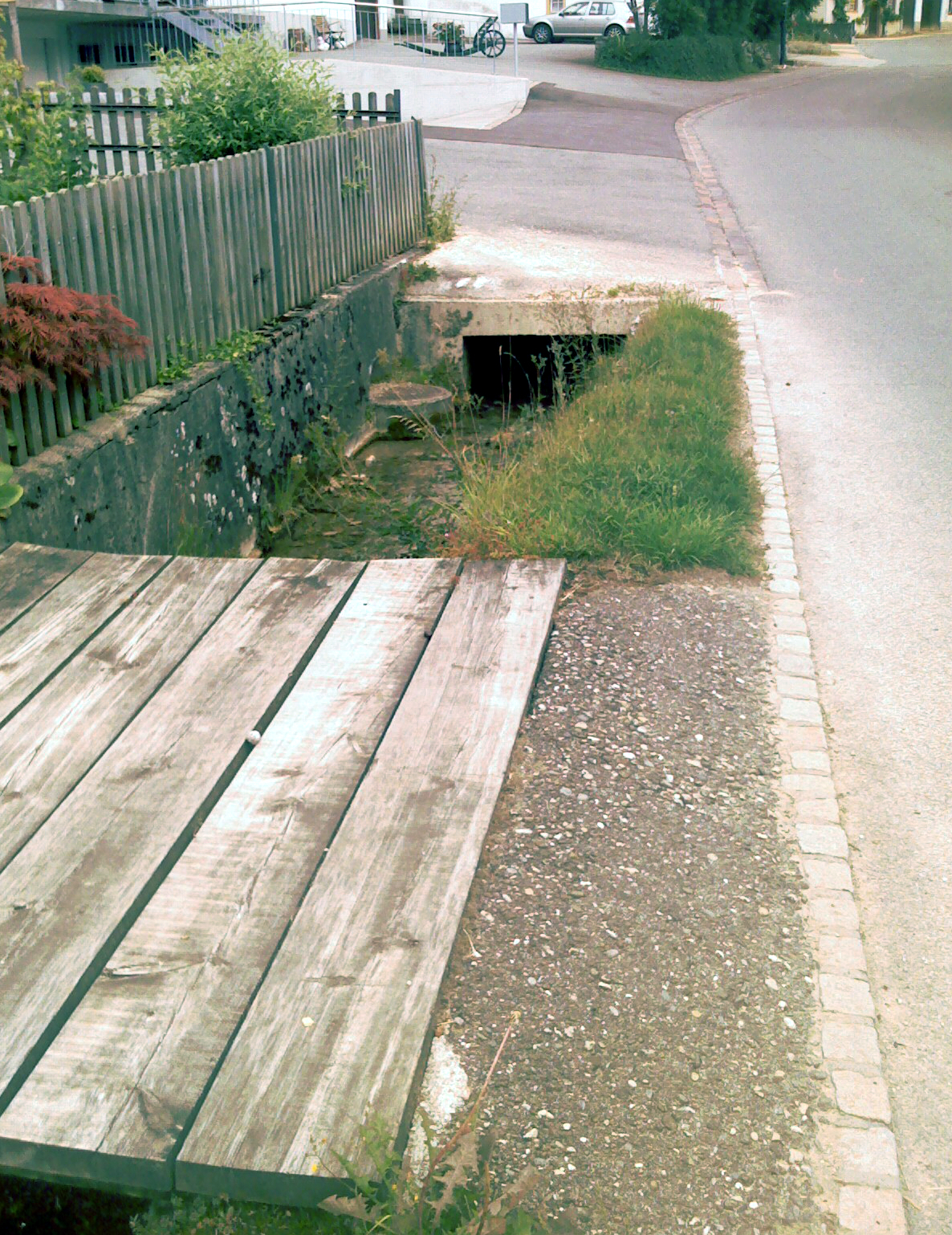
Source of the Ergolz in Oltingen

Since 1934 the water level and discharge of the Ergolz have been measured at Liestal. During these more than 70 years, the average flow towards the Rhine was 3.73 cubic metres per second (132 cu ft/s). During 2006, the average flow was 5.63 cubic metres per second (199 cu ft/s). The peak in that year was on 10 April 2006, at 134 cubic metres per second (4,700 cu ft/s). The extreme values measured at Liestal were a minimum of 0.1 cubic metres per second (3.5 cu ft/s) (in 1947) and a maximum of 155 cubic metres per second (5,500 cu ft/s) (in 1999).

== History ==
The river supplied drinking water to the Roman city of Augusta Raurica. To this end, an aqueduct was constructed, which began upstream of today's Liestal. Parts of the aqueduct still stand today. Two places where the aqueduct can be visited and walked today, are in the Heidenloch district of Liestal and north-east of the sewage treatment plant in Füllinsdorf.

The Ergolz was increasingly polluted during the first half of the 20th century. From 1960 onwards, pollution was countered by the construction of sewage treatment plants.

== See also ==
- List of rivers of Switzerland
