= Füllinsdorf =

- Municipality
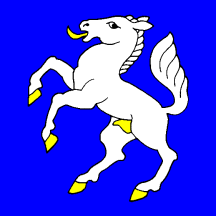
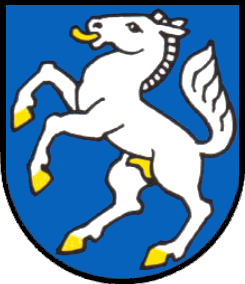
- Flag Coat of arms
- Location of Füllinsdorf
- Location within Switzerland Location within Canton of Basel-Landschaft
- Coordinates: 47°30′N 7°44′E
- Country: Switzerland
- Canton: Basel-Landschaft
- District: Liestal

Area
  - Total: 4.61 km^{2} (1.78 sq mi)
- Elevation: 340 m (1,120 ft)

Population (June 2021)
  - Total: 4,653
  - Density: 1,010/km^{2} (2,610/sq mi)
- Time zone: UTC+01:00 (CET)
  - Summer (DST): UTC+02:00 (CEST)
- Postal code: 4414
- SFOS number: 2825
- ISO 3166 code: CH-BL
- Surrounded by: Arisdorf, Augst, Frenkendorf, Giebenach, Liestal, Pratteln
- Website: fuellinsdorf.ch

Füllinsdorf is a municipality located in the district of Liestal in the canton of Basel-Country in Switzerland.

== History ==
Füllinsdorf was first mentioned in 825 as Firinisvilla. In 1225-26 it was mentioned as Vilistorf.

== Geography ==
Aerial view (1948)

Füllinsdorf has an area, as of 2009, of 4.61 square kilometers (1.78 sq mi). Of this area, 1.71 km^{2} (0.66 sq mi) or 37.1% is used for agricultural purposes, while 1.49 km^{2} (0.58 sq mi) or 32.3% is forested. Of the rest of the land, 1.4 km^{2} (0.54 sq mi) or 30.4% is settled (buildings or roads), 0.03 km^{2} (7.4 acres) or 0.7% is either rivers or lakes.

Of the built up area, industrial buildings made up 5.0% of the total area while housing and buildings made up 15.6% and transportation infrastructure made up 5.0%. Power and water infrastructure as well as other special developed areas made up 3.0% of the area while parks, green belts and sports fields made up 1.7%. Out of the forested land, 29.7% of the total land area is heavily forested and 2.6% is covered with orchards or small clusters of trees. Of the agricultural land, 17.4% is used for growing crops and 12.4% is pastures, while 7.4% is used for orchards or vine crops. All the water in the municipality is flowing water.

The municipality is located in the Liestal district. The old village was built on the hillside above the Ergolz valley. In the 17th and 18th centuries, the industrial settlement of Niederschönthal grew up along the left bank of the Ergolz.

== Coat of arms ==
The blazon of the municipal coat of arms is Azure, a Horse salient Argent langued, hoofed and vilené Or.

== Demographics ==
Füllinsdorf has a population (as of June 2021) of 4,653. As of 2008, 23.3% of the population are resident foreign nationals. Over the last 10 years (1997–2007) the population has changed at a rate of 3.6%.

Most of the population (as of 2000) speaks German (3,562 or 85.5%), with Italian language being second most common (143 or 3.4%) and Turkish being third (75 or 1.8%). There are 56 people who speak French and 3 people who speak Romansh.

As of 2008, the gender distribution of the population was 49.0% male and 51.0% female. The population was made up of 3,291 Swiss citizens (75.4% of the population), and 1,072 non-Swiss residents (24.6%) Of the population in the municipality 700 or about 16.8% were born in Füllinsdorf and lived there in 2000. There were 1,031 or 24.8% who were born in the same canton, while 1,251 or 30.0% were born somewhere else in Switzerland, and 1,063 or 25.5% were born outside of Switzerland.

In 2008 there were 24 live births to Swiss citizens and 15 births to non-Swiss citizens, and in same time span there were 18 deaths of Swiss citizens and 3 non-Swiss citizen deaths. Ignoring immigration and emigration, the population of Swiss citizens increased by 6 while the foreign population increased by 12. There were 7 Swiss men and 4 Swiss women who emigrated from Switzerland. At the same time, there were 13 non-Swiss men and 24 non-Swiss women who immigrated from another country to Switzerland. The total Swiss population change in 2008 (from all sources, including moves across municipal borders) was a decrease of 6 and the non-Swiss population increased by 20 people. This represents a population growth rate of 0.3%.

The age distribution, as of 2010, in Füllinsdorf is; 285 children or 6.5% of the population are between 0 and 6 years old and 510 teenagers or 11.7% are between 7 and 19. Of the adult population, 535 people or 12.3% of the population are between 20 and 29 years old. 513 people or 11.8% are between 30 and 39, 618 people or 14.2% are between 40 and 49, and 941 people or 21.6% are between 50 and 64. The senior population distribution is 712 people or 16.3% of the population are between 65 and 79 years old and there are 249 people or 5.7% who are over 80.

As of 2000, there were 1,498 people who were single and never married in the municipality. There were 2,195 married individuals, 220 widows or widowers and 251 individuals who are divorced.

As of 2000, there were 1,819 private households in the municipality, and an average of 2.2 persons per household. There were 556 households that consist of only one person and 83 households with five or more people. Out of a total of 1,852 households that answered this question, 30.0% were households made up of just one person and 9 were adults who lived with their parents. Of the rest of the households, there are 633 married couples without children, 508 married couples with children There were 97 single parents with a child or children. There were 16 households that were made up unrelated people and 33 households that were made some sort of institution or another collective housing.

In 2000 there were 692 single family homes (or 74.9% of the total) out of a total of 924 inhabited buildings. There were 142 multi-family buildings (15.4%), along with 59 multi-purpose buildings that were mostly used for housing (6.4%) and 31 other use buildings (commercial or industrial) that also had some housing (3.4%). Of the single family homes 25 were built before 1919, while 68 were built between 1990 and 2000. The greatest number of single family homes (174) were built between 1971 and 1980.

In 2000 there were 1,966 apartments in the municipality. The most common apartment size was 3 rooms of which there were 534. There were 61 single room apartments and 627 apartments with five or more rooms. Of these apartments, a total of 1,785 apartments (90.8% of the total) were permanently occupied, while 131 apartments (6.7%) were seasonally occupied and 50 apartments (2.5%) were empty. As of 2007, the construction rate of new housing units was 0.9 new units per 1000 residents. As of 2000 the average price to rent a two-room apartment was about 783.00 CHF (US$630, £350, €500), a three-room apartment was about 976.00 CHF (US$780, £440, €620) and a four-room apartment cost an average of 1194.00 CHF (US$960, £540, €760). The vacancy rate for the municipality, in 2008, was 1.22%.

The historical population is given in the following chart:

== Politics ==
In the 2007 federal election the most popular party was the SVP which received 31.45% of the vote. The next three most popular parties were the FDP (24.05%), the SP (23.1%) and the Green Party (9.8%). In the federal election, a total of 1,358 votes were cast, and the voter turnout was 48.1%.

== Economy ==
As of 2007, Füllinsdorf had an unemployment rate of 3.33%. As of 2005, there were 102 people employed in the primary economic sector and about 13 businesses involved in this sector. 505 people were employed in the secondary sector and there were 41 businesses in this sector. 1,251 people were employed in the tertiary sector, with 132 businesses in this sector. There were 2,178 residents of the municipality who were employed in some capacity, of which females made up 44.0% of the workforce.

In 2008 the total number of full-time equivalent jobs was 1,549. The number of jobs in the primary sector was 52, all of which were in agriculture. The number of jobs in the secondary sector was 466, of which 271 or (58.2%) were in manufacturing and 179 (38.4%) were in construction. The number of jobs in the tertiary sector was 1,031. In the tertiary sector; 375 or 36.4% were in wholesale or retail sales or the repair of motor vehicles, 64 or 6.2% were in the movement and storage of goods, 49 or 4.8% were in a hotel or restaurant, 14 or 1.4% were in the information industry, 40 or 3.9% were the insurance or financial industry, 258 or 25.0% were technical professionals or scientists, 25 or 2.4% were in education and 85 or 8.2% were in health care.

In 2000, there were 1,486 workers who commuted into the municipality and 1,795 workers who commuted away. The municipality is a net exporter of workers, with about 1.2 workers leaving the municipality for every one entering. About 11.0% of the workforce coming into Füllinsdorf are coming from outside Switzerland, while 0.2% of the locals commute out of Switzerland for work. Of the working population, 23.7% used public transportation to get to work, and 49.1% used a private car.

== Religion ==
From the 2000 census, 1,071 or 25.7% were Roman Catholic, while 1,837 or 44.1% belonged to the Swiss Reformed Church. Of the rest of the population, there were 96 members of an Orthodox church (or about 2.31% of the population), there were 13 individuals (or about 0.31% of the population) who belonged to the Christian Catholic Church, and there were 142 individuals (or about 3.41% of the population) who belonged to another Christian church. There were 4 individuals (or about 0.10% of the population) who were Jewish, and 322 (or about 7.73% of the population) who were Islamic. There were 17 individuals who were Buddhist, 12 individuals who were Hindu and 9 individuals who belonged to another church. 523 (or about 12.56% of the population) belonged to no church, are agnostic or atheist, and 118 individuals (or about 2.83% of the population) did not answer the question.

== Education ==
In Füllinsdorf about 1,683 or (40.4%) of the population have completed non-mandatory upper secondary education, and 641 or (15.4%) have completed additional higher education (either university or a Fachhochschule). Of the 641 who completed tertiary schooling, 64.3% were Swiss men, 20.9% were Swiss women, 10.5% were non-Swiss men and 4.4% were non-Swiss women.

As of 2000, there were 44 students in Füllinsdorf who came from another municipality, while 247 residents attended schools outside the municipality.
