= Lubawka =

Town in Lower Silesian Voivodeship, Poland

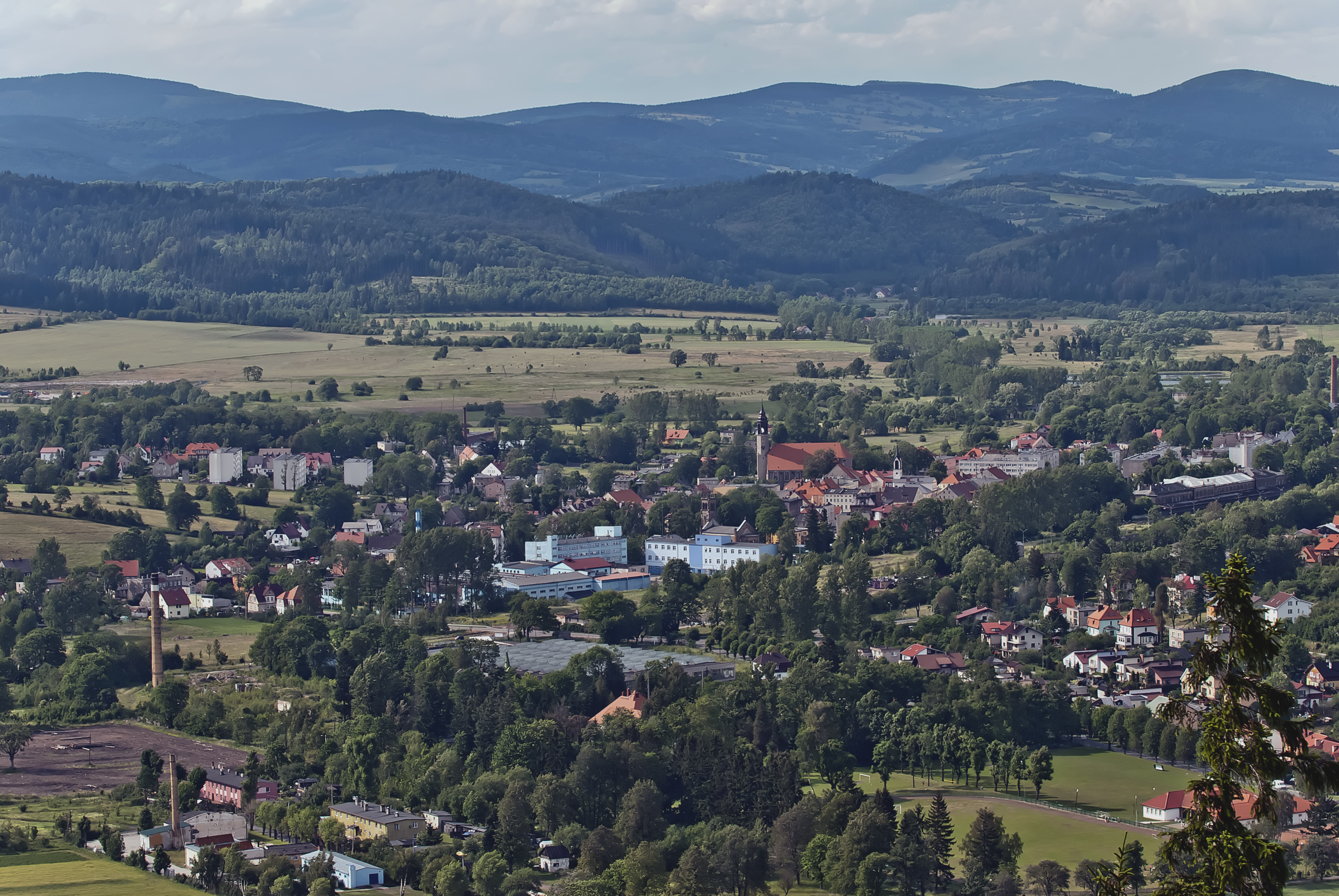
- View of Lubawka from Krucza Skała

- Flag Coat of arms

- Location within Poland
- Coordinates: 50°42′12″N 16°0′7″E
- Country: Poland
- Voivodeship: Lower Silesian
- County: Kamienna Góra
- Gmina: Lubawka
- First mentioned: 1284
- Town rights: ca. 1292

Area
  - Total: 22.44 km^{2} (8.66 sq mi)

Population (2019-06-30)
  - Total: 6,028
  - Density: 268.6/km^{2} (695.7/sq mi)
- Time zone: UTC+1 (CET)
  - Summer (DST): UTC+2 (CEST)
- Website: http://www.lubawka.net.pl

Lubawka [luˈbafka] (German: Liebau) is a town in south-western Poland, in Lower Silesia Voivodship, in Kamienna Góra County. It is the administrative seat of Gmina Lubawka. Two small rivers, the Bóbr and Czarnuszka, run through the town, which has 6,028 inhabitants (2019).

== History ==
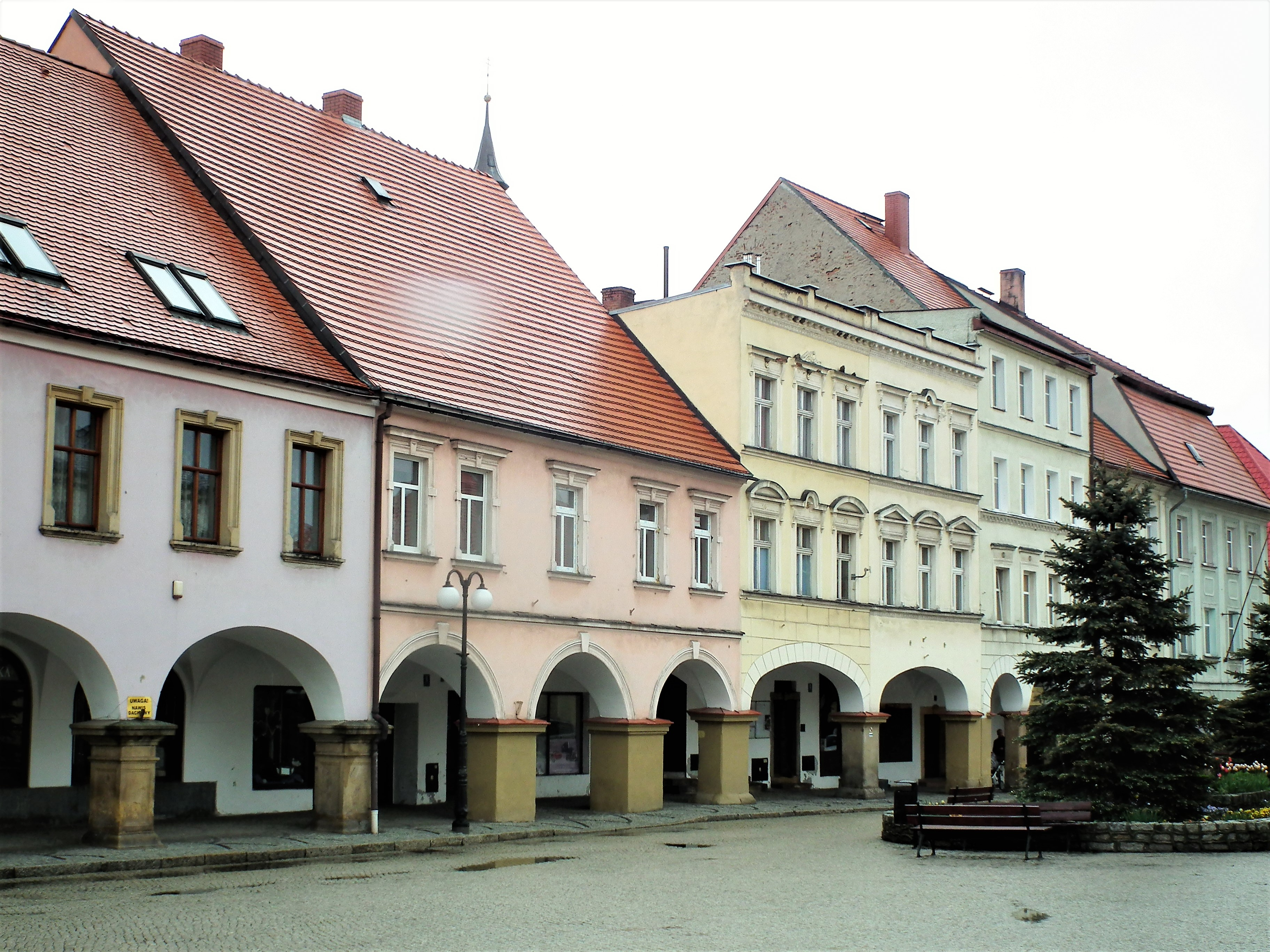
Colourful arcaded houses at the Market Square (Rynek)

In the 13th century a Polish defensive stronghold on the border with the Czech Kingdom was located in present-day Lubawka. The first written reference to Lubawka is from 1284 when it was written down as Lubavia. The name is of Polish origin, and it comes from the word lubić, which means "to like", or from the word łub, which means "bark". In 1292 Duke Bolko I the Strict granted Lubawka, which at that time already enjoyed town rights, to the Cistercian monastery in Krzeszów, to which it belonged until 1810. The town remained part of the Polish Duchy of Świdnica until 1392, when it passed to the Bohemian Crown.

The town was destroyed twice during the Hussite Wars in 1425 and 1431. From 1526 with the Bohemian Crown it was part of the Habsburg Empire. Another great war disaster hit Lubawka when the Swedish army during the Thirty Years' War devastated the city which was abandoned by its inhabitants for more than six months. The city developed rapidly in the 18th century, particularly due to growth in the textile industry there and in surrounding villages. Unfortunately, several great fires damaged the city in those times. The largest one in 1734 destroyed the town hall, school, church, vicarage and almost all buildings. It was one of the locations of the Silesian weavers' uprising of 1793, brutally crushed by Prussian troops.

In 1810 when the Cistercian monastery in Krzeszów (then Grüssau) was abolished, Lubawka (then under the Germanized name Liebau) in conjunction with nearby Chełmsko Śląskie began to develop on their own. The railway, a great incentive to faster development, arrived in Liebau from Sędzisław in 1867. Several years later it was extended to Královec and connected with Žacléř and Trutnov in the nearby Czech Kingdom. In those times coal mining reached prosperity.

From 1871 to 1945 the town was part of Germany. At the end of 19th century Lubawka and the surrounding villages became very well known as a destination for tourism. The German Olympic team used a facility built near Lubawka to prepare for the Berlin Olympic Games in 1936. In Nazi Germany the facility was used by Hitler-Jugend as a training and recreation center. In 1944, a branch of the German Gross-Rosen concentration camp was established in the city to house 500 Jewish women sent from Auschwitz.

On May 7, 1945, the town was occupied by the Soviet Red Army. In accordance to the Potsdam Agreement the town's German population was in totality expelled and the area was re-settled by Poles, transferred from the former eastern Poland annexed by the Soviet Union, as well as from the war-devastated area of the city of Nowy Sącz in present southeastern Poland. The city was renamed as Lubawka, referring to its original Polish name. Lubawka became once again a Polish border town located on the Polish-Czech border.

== Places of interest ==
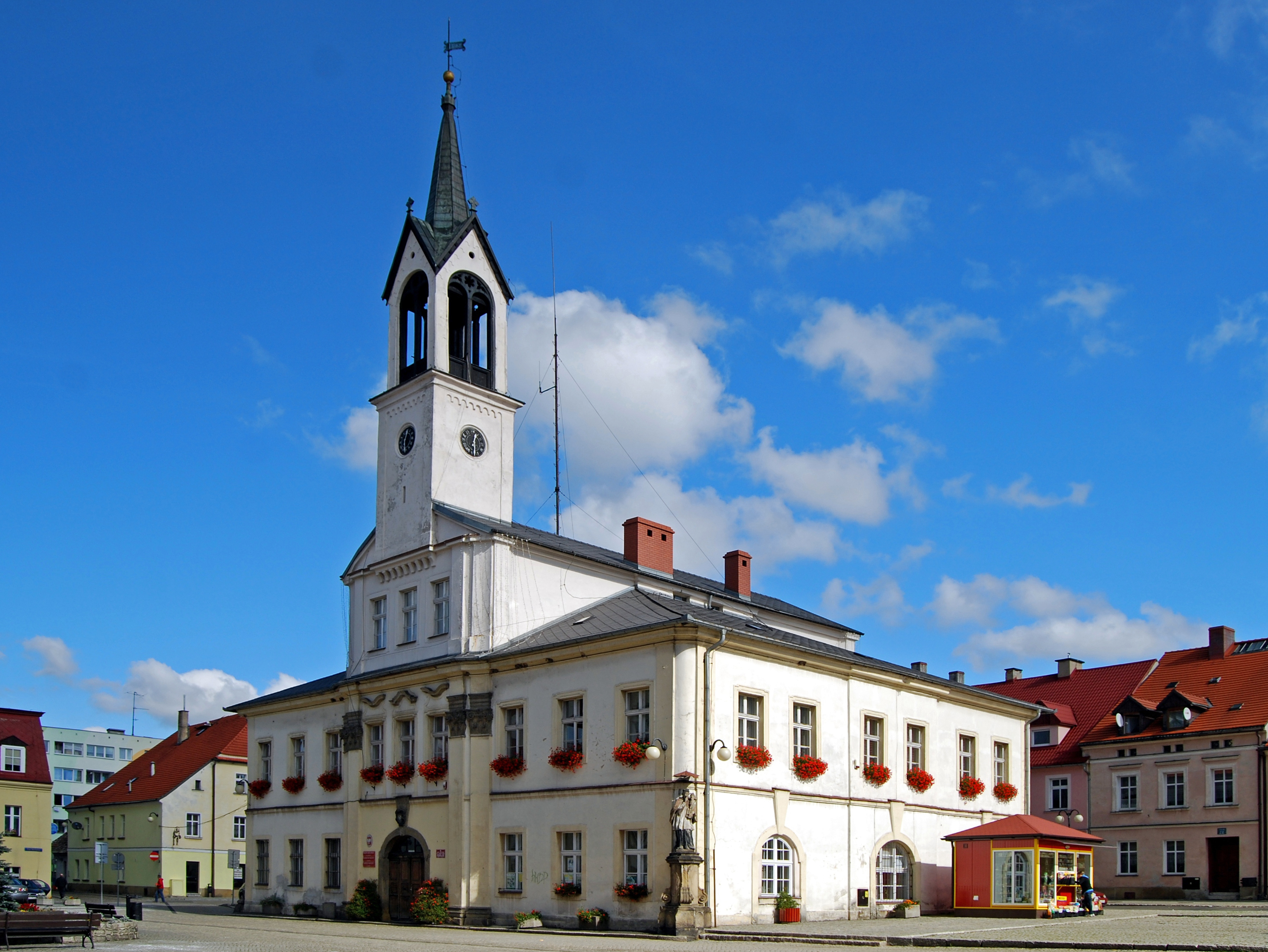
Town Hall at the Market Square (Rynek)

- Market Square (Rynek) filled with colourful historic townhouses
- Town Hall (Ratusz) from 18th century
- Krucza Skała ("Raven Rock"), with a ski jumping hill
- Dolina Miłości ("Valley of Love")
- Medieval Church of St. Mary
- 17th-century Church of St. Anne
- Lubawka Calvary (Polish: Kalwaria Lubawska)
- Baroque Saint Christopher's Church in the Ulanowice district

== Pop music references ==
The town is mentioned in the version of the 1964 song Universal Soldier by Buffy Sainte-Marie released in 1965 by Scottish singer Donovan; the original used Dachau.

== Notable people ==
- Wolfgang Liebeneiner (1905–1987), actor
- Otto Mueller (1874–1930), painter and lithographer
- Johann-Georg Richert (1890–1946), Wehrmacht general
- Edgar Röhricht (1892–1967), Wehrmacht general
- Ryszard Zbrzyzny (born 1955), politician

== Twin towns – sister cities ==
See twin towns of Gmina Lubawka.
