= Błażkowa =

Błażkowa may refer to the following places in Poland:

- Błażkowa, Lower Silesian Voivodeship (south-west Poland)
- Błażkowa, Subcarpathian Voivodeship (south-east Poland)
