= Schomberg =

Schomberg or Schömberg may refer to various people or places:

== Places ==
=== In Canada ===
- Schomberg, Ontario, an unincorporated village
  - Schomberg (Sloan Field) Aerodrome

=== In Germany ===
- Schömberg, Thuringia, in the district of Greiz, Thuringia
- Schömberg, Zollernalbkreis, in the district Zollernalbkreis, Baden-Württemberg
- Schömberg, Calw, in the district of Calw, Baden-Württemberg

=== In Poland ===
- Schomberg, German name for Szombierki, a district of Bytom
- Schömberg, the former German name for Chełmsko Śląskie in Lower Silesia

=== In Hungary ===
- Schomberg, German name for Somberek, a village in Baranya county

== People ==
- Schomberg (surname)
- Schomberg Kerr, 9th Marquess of Lothian (1833–1900), styled Lord Schomberg Kerr until 1870, was a British diplomat and Conservative politician
- Schomberg Kerr McDonnell (1861–1915), British Army officer, politician and civil servant

== Other uses ==
- Schomberg (1855), a cargo ship
- Schomberg House, London
- Schomberg House, Belfast, the headquarters of the Grand Orange Lodge of Ireland and Museum of Orange Heritage
- Duke of Schomberg, a title in the Peerage of England

== See also ==
- Shamberg (disambiguation)
- Schaumburg, a district of Lower Saxony, Germany
- Schomburg (disambiguation)
- Schönberg (disambiguation)
- Schomberg Cougars, a Canadian ice hockey team
- Schomberg Observation Tower, a German observation tower
