= Uniemyśl =

Uniemyśl may refer to the following places in Poland:

- Uniemyśl, Lower Silesian Voivodeship
- Uniemyśl, West Pomeranian Voivodeship
