= Schaumburg (disambiguation) =

Schaumburg is a district in Lower Saxony, Germany. Schauenburg is a municipality in Hesse

Schaumburg or Schauenburg, often used interchangeably, may also refer to:

== People ==
- Balthazar Alexis Henri Schauenburg (1748–1838), general of the French Revolutionary Wars and Napoleonic Wars
- House of Schaumburg, a regional German dynasty ruling the counties of Schaumburg and Holstein
- Jules Henri Jean Schaumburg (1839–1886), Belgian painter, who was Louis Rousselet's travelling companion in India from May 1865 to September 1868

== Places and territories ==
- County of Schaumburg, a former county of the Holy Roman Empire in modern-day Lower Saxony, Germany
- County of Schaunberg (also Schaumberg), a former county of the Holy Roman Empire in modern-day Upper Austria
- Schaumburg, Illinois, a village in Illinois, United States
  - Schaumburg station, a transit station in the village
  - Schaumburg Township, Cook County, Illinois

== Castles and palaces ==
- Schaumburg Castle, Lower Saxony (Burg Schaumburg), a castle in the district of Schaumburg in Lower Saxony
- Schaumburg Castle, Rhineland-Palatinate (Schloss Schaumburg), a castle in the district of Rhein-Lahn in Rhineland-Palatinate
- Burgruine Schaumburg, a ruined castle in Carinthia, Austria
- Palais Schaumburg in Bonn, the second official residence and office of the Chancellor of Germany
- Schauenburg Castle, three different ruined castles with the same name

== See also ==
- Schauenburg (disambiguation)
- Schomburg (disambiguation)
