= Schomburg =

Schomburg is a surname. Notable people with the surname include:

== People ==
- Alex Schomburg (1905–1998), prolific American commercial and comic book artist and painter whose career lasted over 70 years
- Arturo Alfonso Schomburg (1874–1938), Puerto Rican historian, writer and activist in the United States
- Wolfgang Schomburg (born 1948), the first German Judge at the International Criminal Tribunal for the former Yugoslavia

== Places ==
- a tiny village around a former castle called Schomburg, close to Wangen im Allgäu in southern Germany

== See also ==
- Schomburg Center for Research in Black Culture, part of the New York Public Library
- Schaumburg (disambiguation)
- Schomberg (disambiguation)
- Schönberg (disambiguation)
- Shamberg (disambiguation)
