= Schauenburg (disambiguation) =

Schauenburg is a municipality in Germany.

Schauenburg may also refer to:

- Balthazar Alexis Henri Schauenburg, a French general who served in the wars of the French Revolution and the Empire.
- Maximilien Joseph Schauenburg, a French officer during the colonial conquest of Algeria.

== See also ==
- Schaumburg (disambiguation)
