= Stara Białka =

- Village
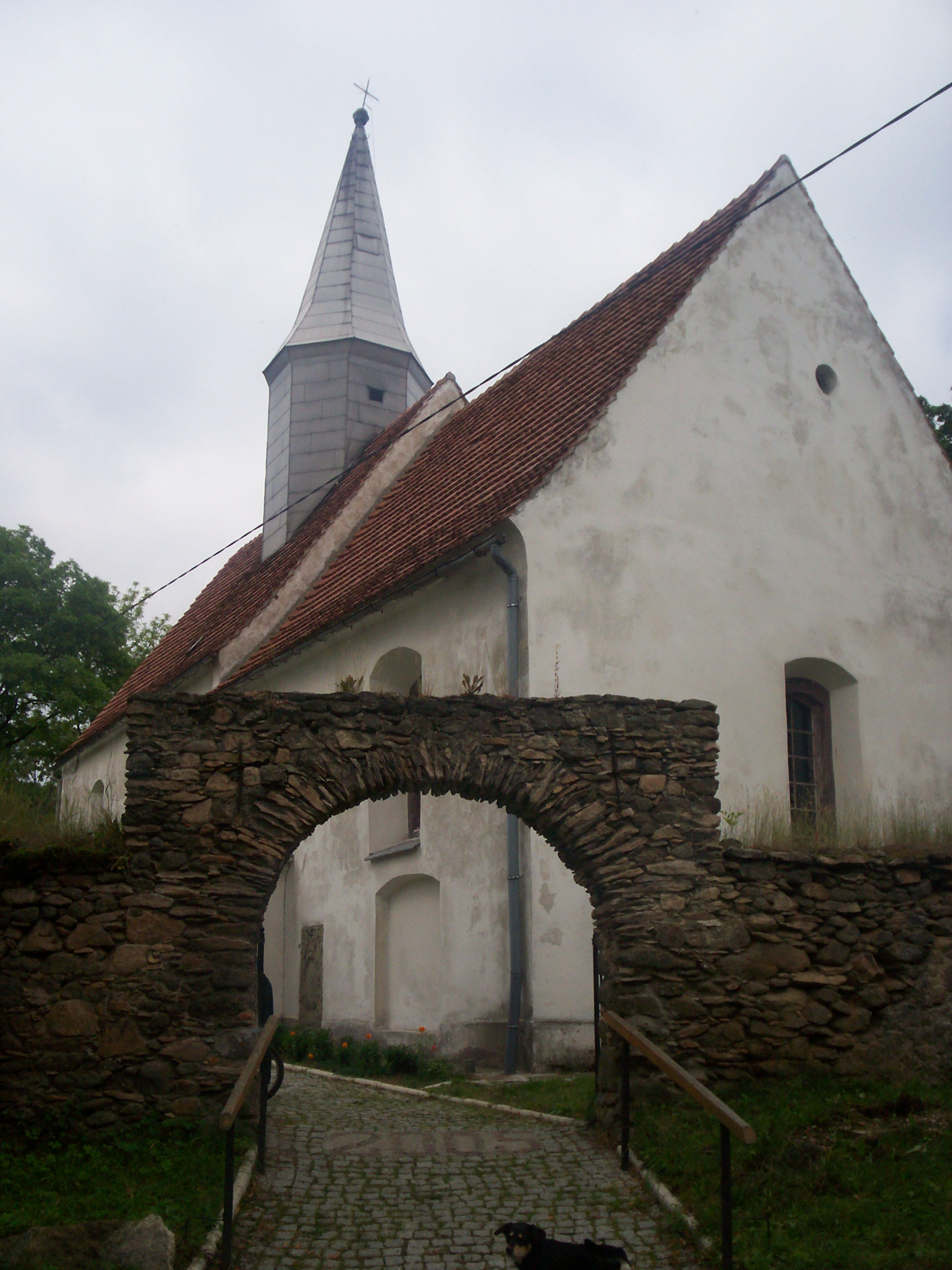

- Location within Poland
- Coordinates: 50°45′N 15°55′E
- Country: Poland
- Voivodeship: Lower Silesian
- County: Kamienna Góra
- Gmina: Lubawka

Stara Białka [ˈstara ˈbjau̯ka] is a village in the administrative district of Gmina Lubawka, within Kamienna Góra County, Lower Silesian Voivodeship, in south-western Poland.

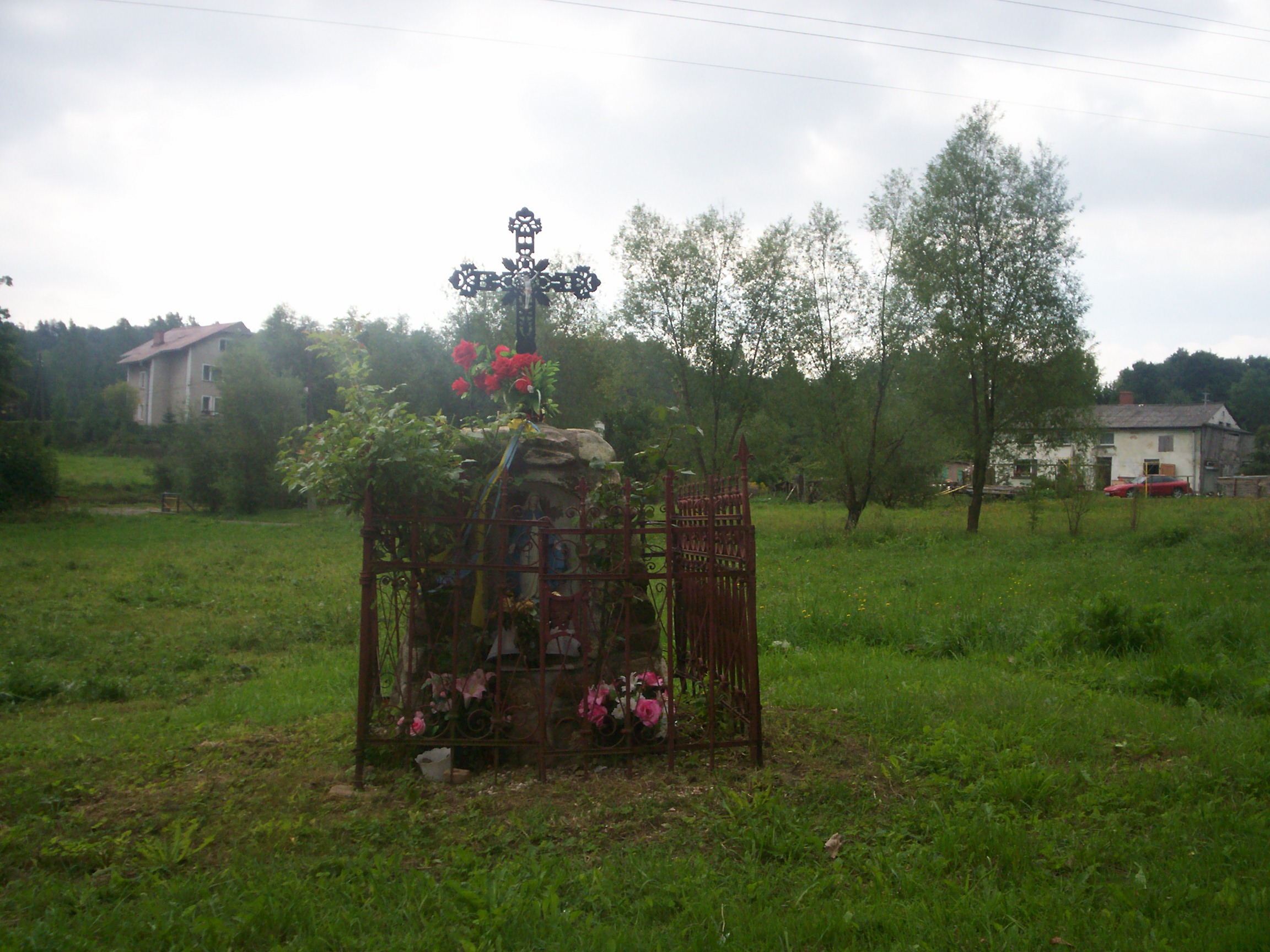
Przydrożna kapliczka.

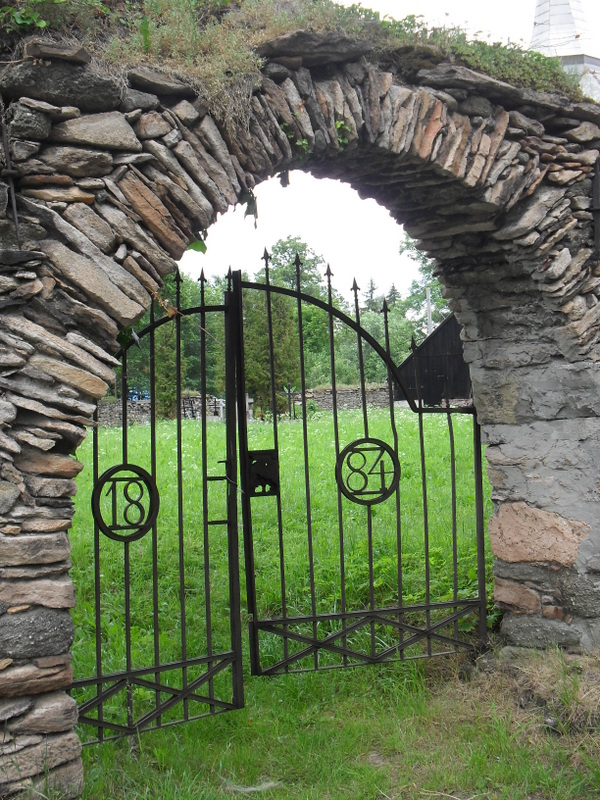
Brama cmentarna.
