= Ryszard Zbrzyzny =

Polish politician

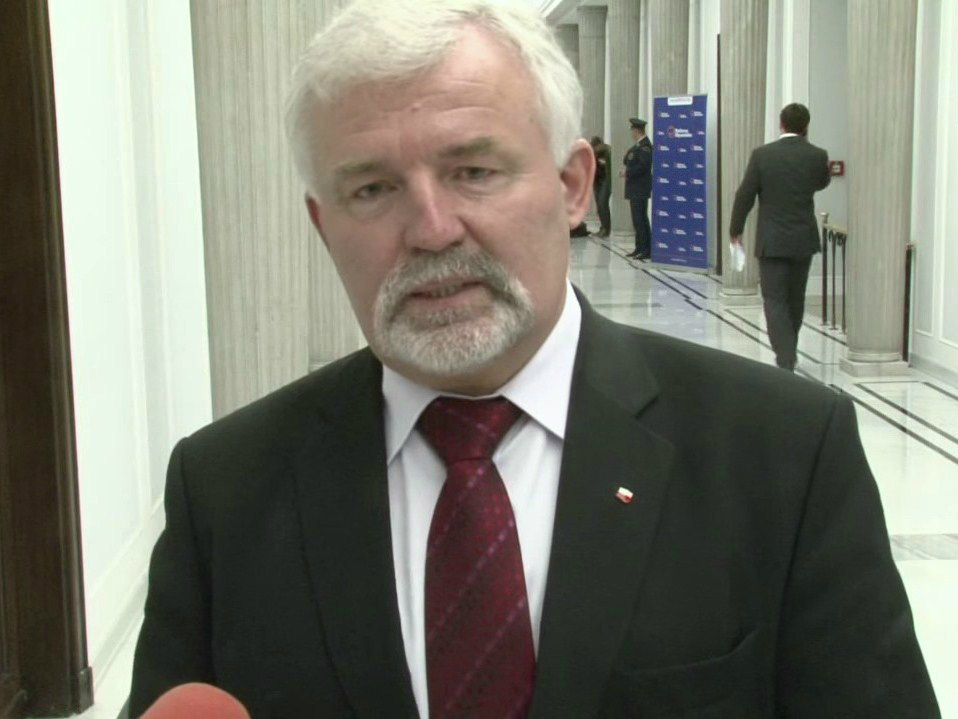

Member of the Sejm
- In office 1993–2015
- Constituency: 1 – Legnica

Personal details
- Born: 4 May 1955 (age 70)
- Party: Democratic Left Alliance

Ryszard Zbrzyzny (born 4 May 1955 in Lubawka) is a Polish politician. He was elected to the Sejm on 25 September 2005, getting 9644 votes in 1 Legnica district as a candidate from Democratic Left Alliance list.

He was also a member of Sejm 1993-1997, Sejm 1997-2001, and Sejm 2001-2005. He served in the Sejm until 2015. He also served as chair of the Copper Industry Workers trade union in 2013.
