= Paczyn =

- Village
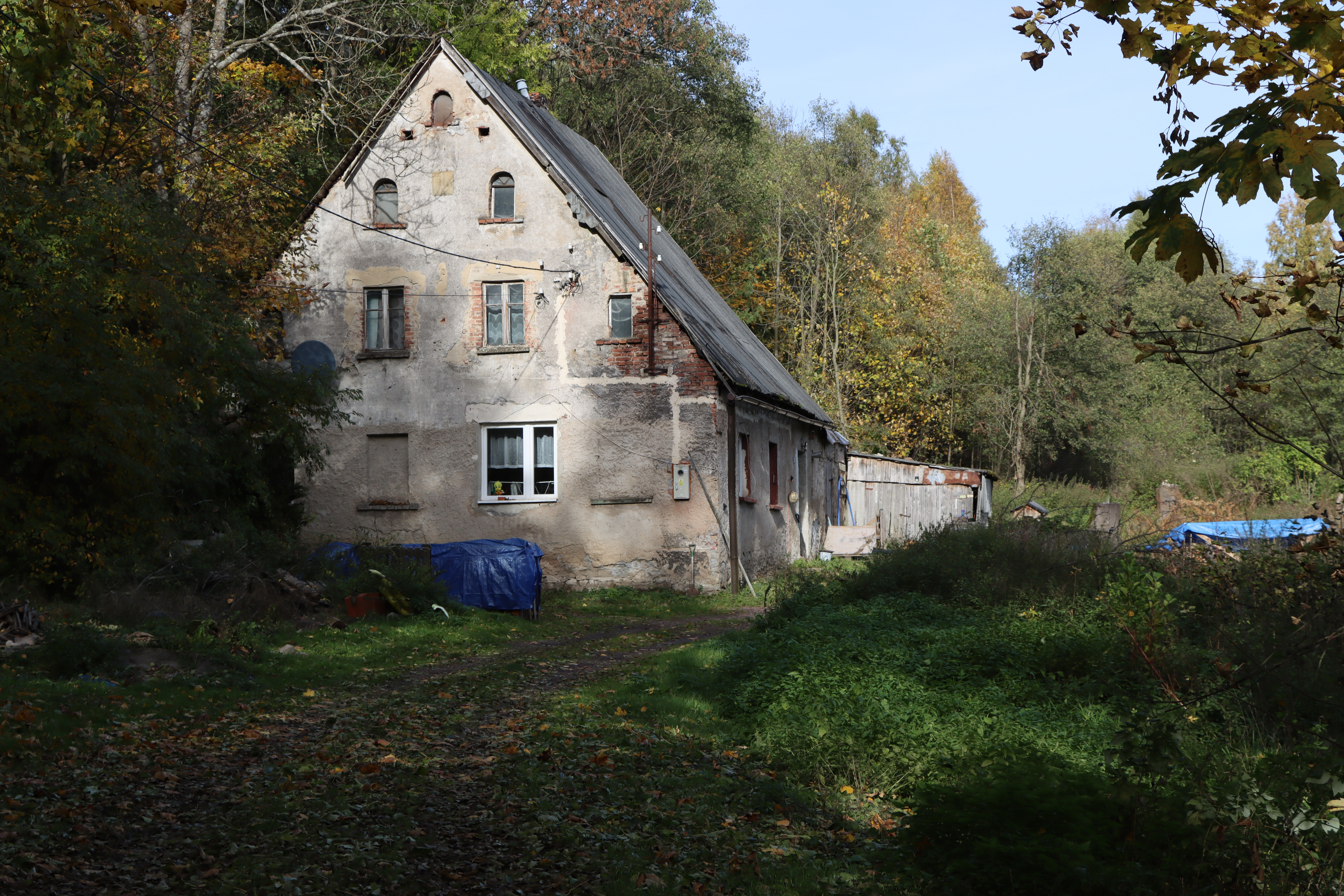
- Old house

- Location within Poland
- Coordinates: 50°44′20″N 15°54′47″E
- Country: Poland
- Voivodeship: Lower Silesian
- County: Kamienna Góra
- Gmina: Lubawka

Paczyn [ˈpat͡ʂɨn] is a village in the administrative district of Gmina Lubawka, within Kamienna Góra County, Lower Silesian Voivodeship, in south-western Poland.

== Gallery ==
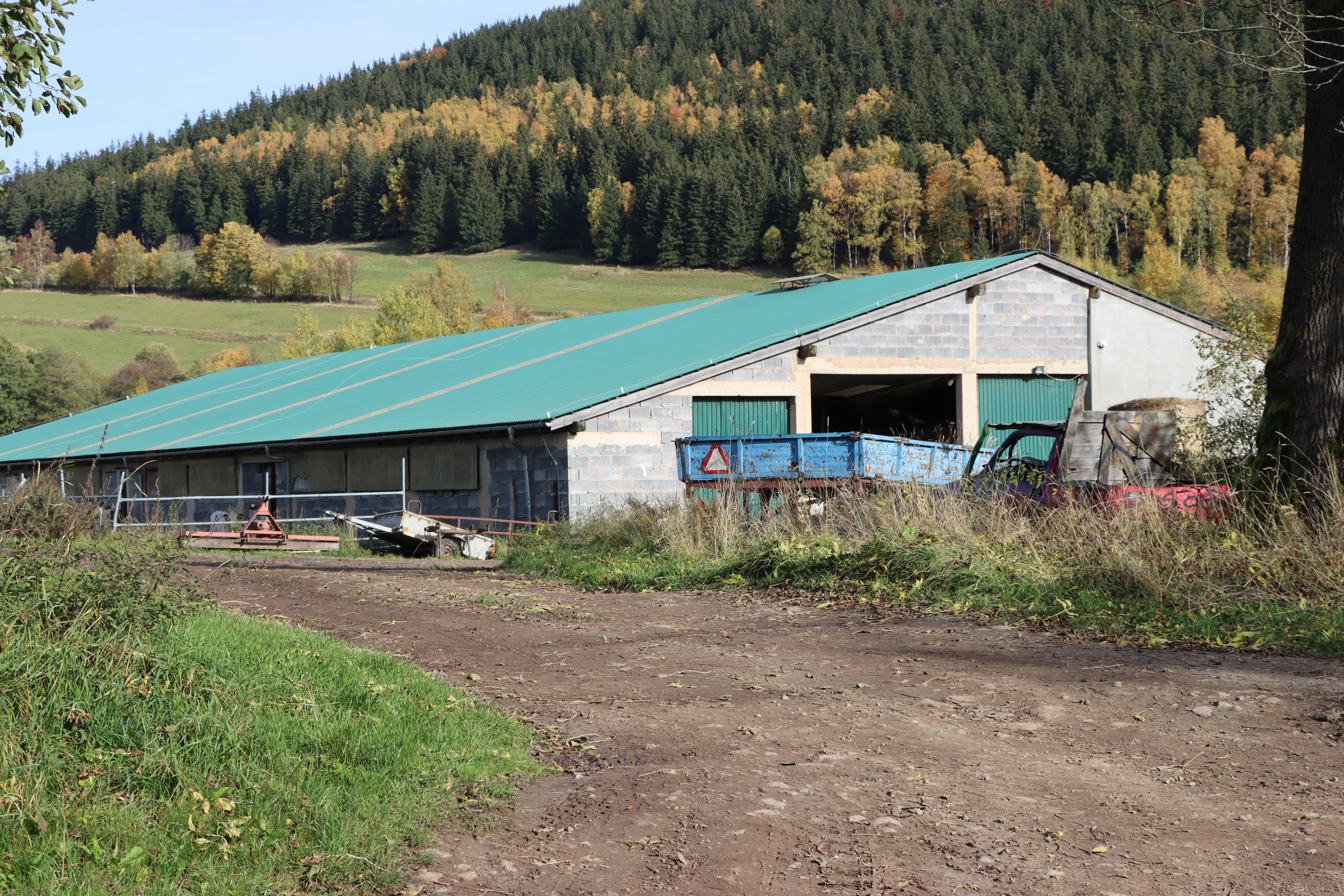
Agriculture facility

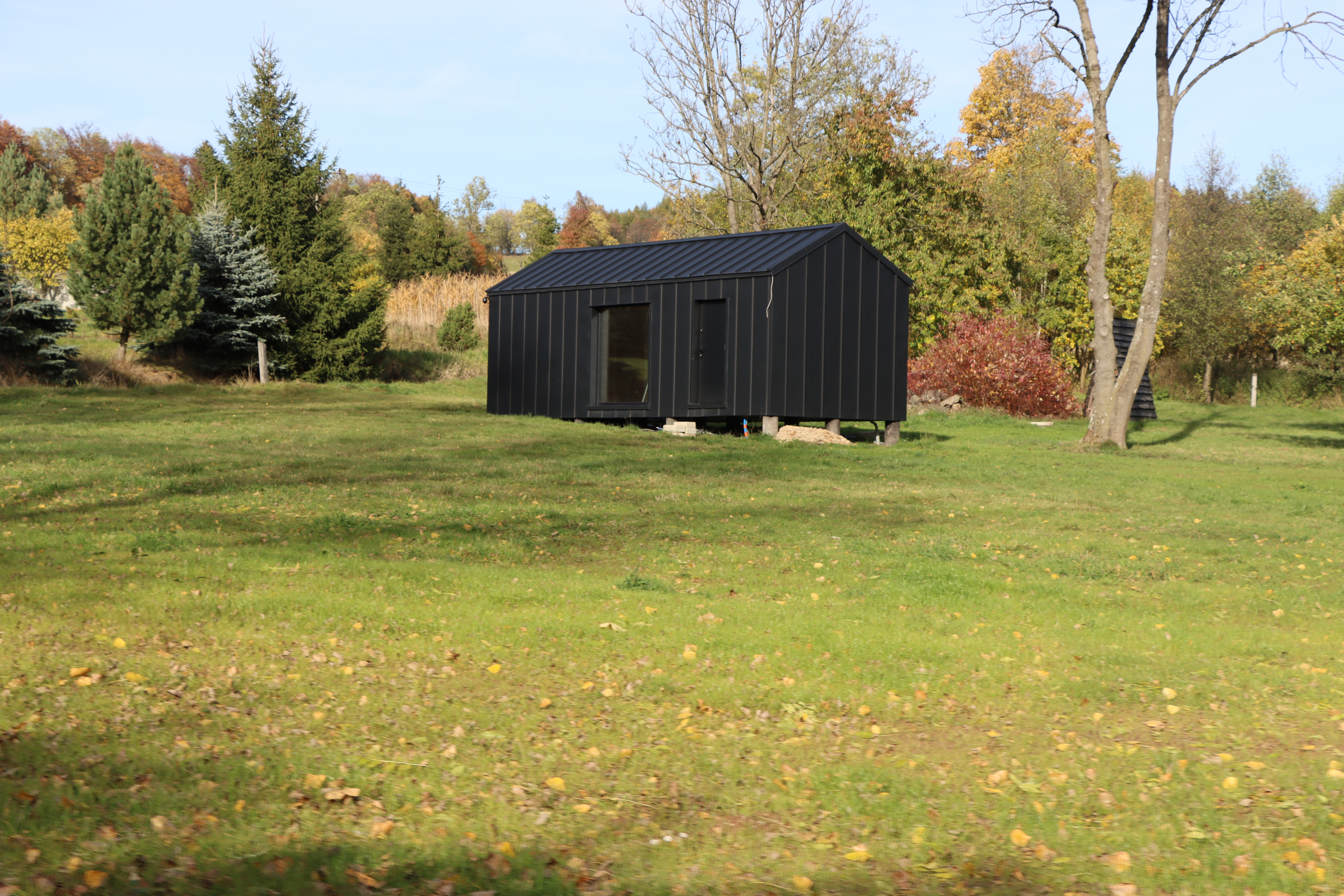
New house (as of 2023)

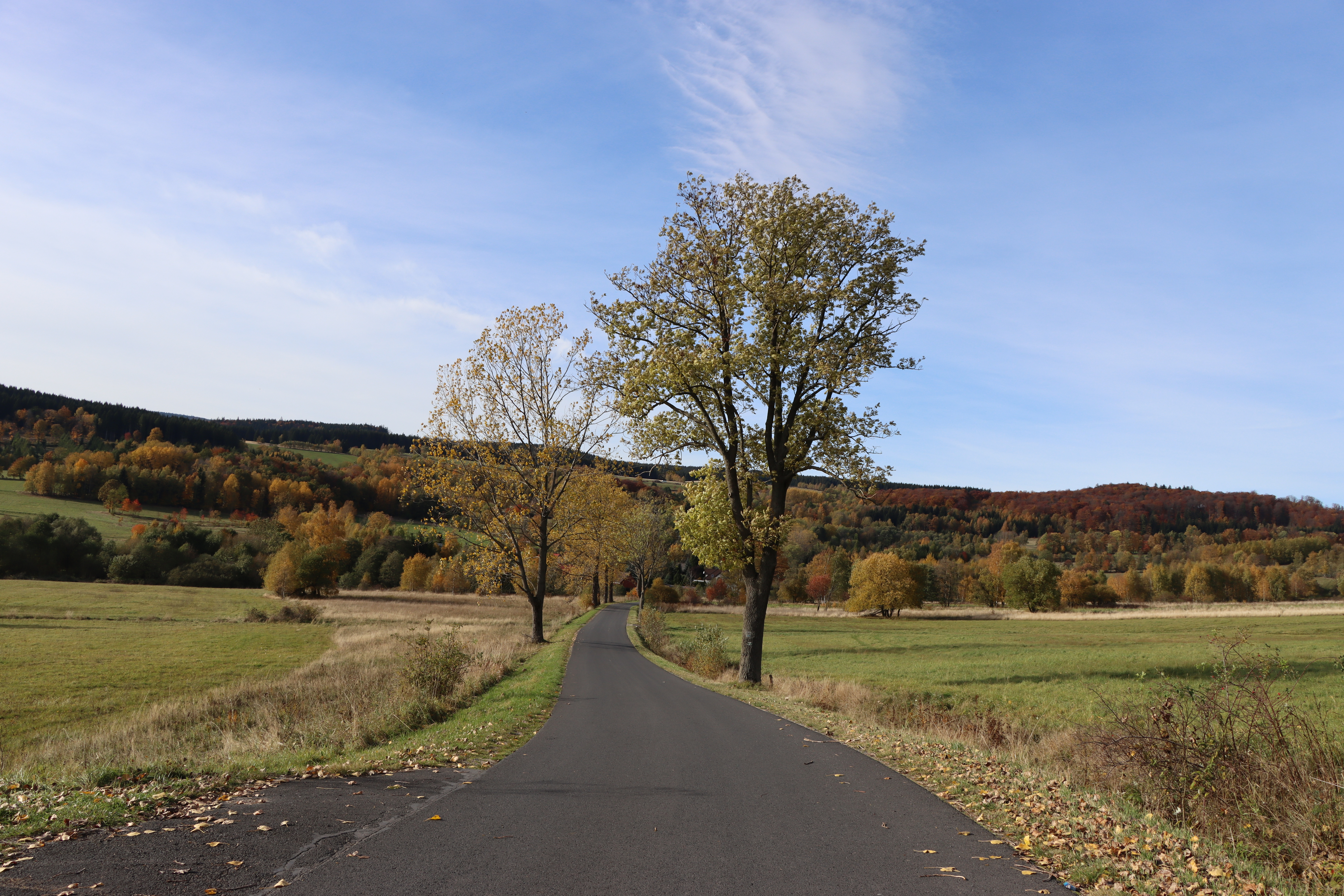
Road to Paczyn and October 2023 surroundings
