= Schauenburg Castle =

Schauenburg Castle can refer to three different castles:

- Neu-Schauenburg Castle, the older ruined castle in Switzerland
- Alt-Schauenburg Castle, the newer ruined castle in Switzerland
- Schauenburg Castle (Oberkirch), a ruined castle in Oberkirch, Germany

== See also ==
- Schaumburg (disambiguation)
