= Szczepanów, Kamienna Góra County =

Szczepanów
- Village
- Location within Poland
- Coordinates: 50°41′50″N 15°56′36″E
- Country: Poland
- Voivodeship: Lower Silesian
- County: Kamienna Góra
- Gmina: Lubawka

Szczepanów [ʂt͡ʂɛˈpanuf] is a village in the administrative district of Gmina Lubawka, within Kamienna Góra County, Lower Silesian Voivodeship, in south-western Poland, near the border with the Czech Republic.
