= Gmina Lubawka =

Gmina Lubawka Lubawka Commune
- Gmina
- Flag Coat of arms
- Interactive map of Gmina Lubawka
- Coordinates (Lubawka): 50°42′12″N 16°0′7″E
- Country: Poland
- Voivodeship: Lower Silesian
- County: Kamienna Góra
- Seat: Lubawka

Area
  - Total: 138.08 km^{2} (53.31 sq mi)

Population (2019-06-30)
  - Total: 10,901
  - Density: 78.947/km^{2} (204.47/sq mi)
- Website: http://www.lubawka.net.pl

Gmina Lubawka is an urban-rural gmina (administrative district) in Kamienna Góra County, Lower Silesian Voivodeship, in south-western Poland. Its seat is the town of Lubawka, which lies approximately 14 kilometres (9 mi) south of Kamienna Góra, and 87 kilometres (54 mi) south-west of the regional capital Wrocław.

The gmina covers an area of 138.08 square kilometres (53.3 sq mi), and as of 2019 its total population is 10,901.

== Neighbouring gminas ==
Gmina Lubawka is bordered by the town of Kowary and the gminas of Kamienna Góra and Mieroszów. It also borders the Czech Republic.

== Villages ==
The gmina contains the villages of Błażejów, Błażkowa, Bukówka, Chełmsko Śląskie, Jarkowice, Miszkowice, Niedamirów, Okrzeszyn, Opawa, Paczyn, Paprotki, Stara Białka, Szczepanów and Uniemyśl.

== Twin towns – sister cities ==
Gmina Lubawka is twinned with:

- Adršpach, Czech Republic
- Žacléř, Czech Republic
