= Miszkowice =

- Village
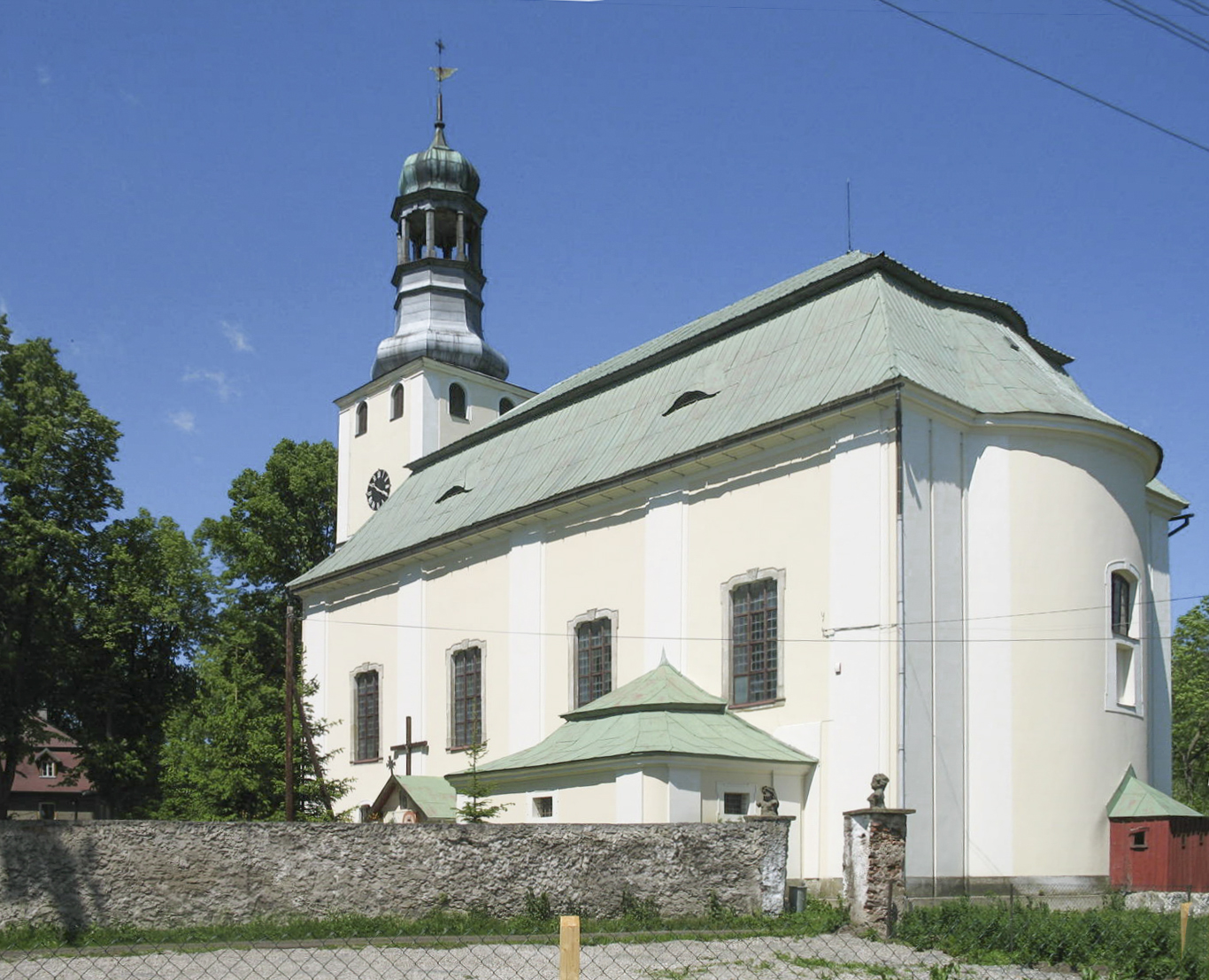
- Church of All Saints

- Location within Poland
- Coordinates: 50°42′N 15°58′E
- Country: Poland
- Voivodeship: Lower Silesian
- County: Kamienna Góra
- Gmina: Lubawka
- First mentioned: 1289
- Time zone: UTC+1 (CET)
  - Summer (DST): UTC+2 (CEST)
- Vehicle registration: DKA

Miszkowice [miʂkɔˈvit͡sɛ] (German: Michelsdorf) is a village in the administrative district of Gmina Lubawka, within Kamienna Góra County, Lower Silesian Voivodeship, in south-western Poland. It is situated on the Złotna River, a tributary of Bóbr.

== History ==
The village was first mentioned in 1289, when it was part of fragmented Piast-ruled Poland.

After World War II, German population of the village fled and was expelled to Germany. In 1945–1947, Poles expelled from Dolina and Majdan in pre-war south-eastern Poland annexed by the Soviet Union, and from Nowy Sącz settled in Miszkowice.

== Gallery ==
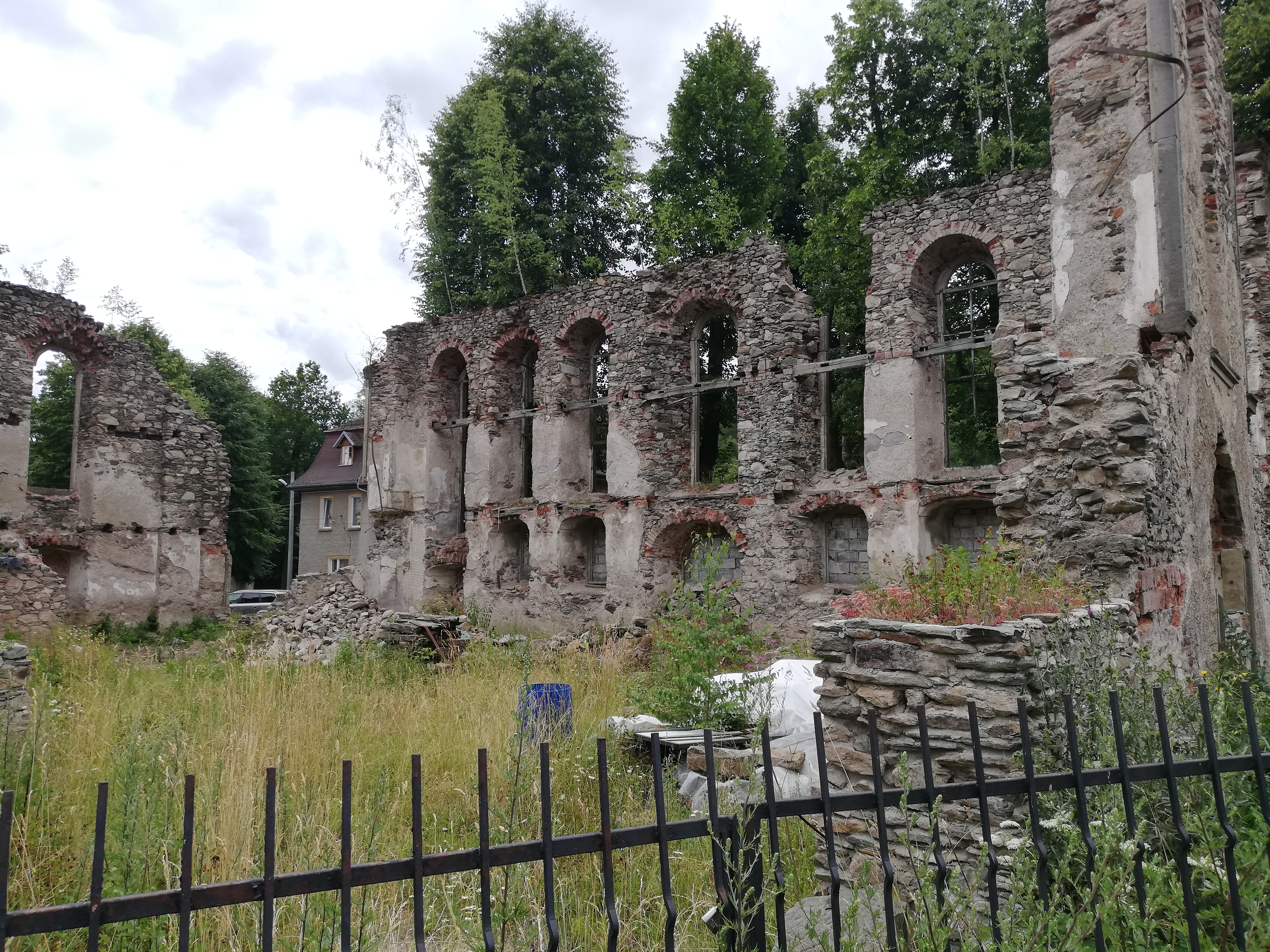
Ruins of a protestant church

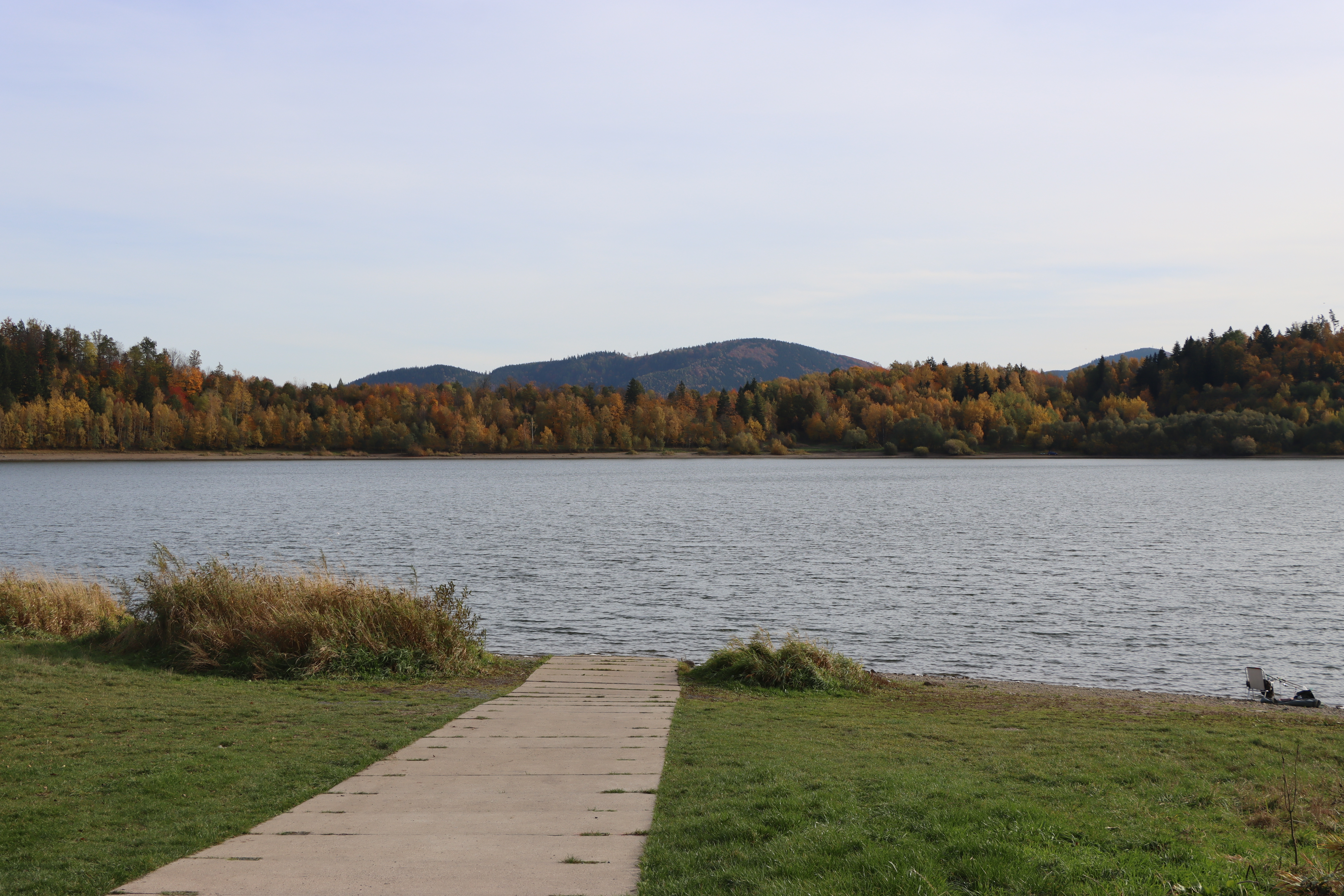
Bukówka Lake

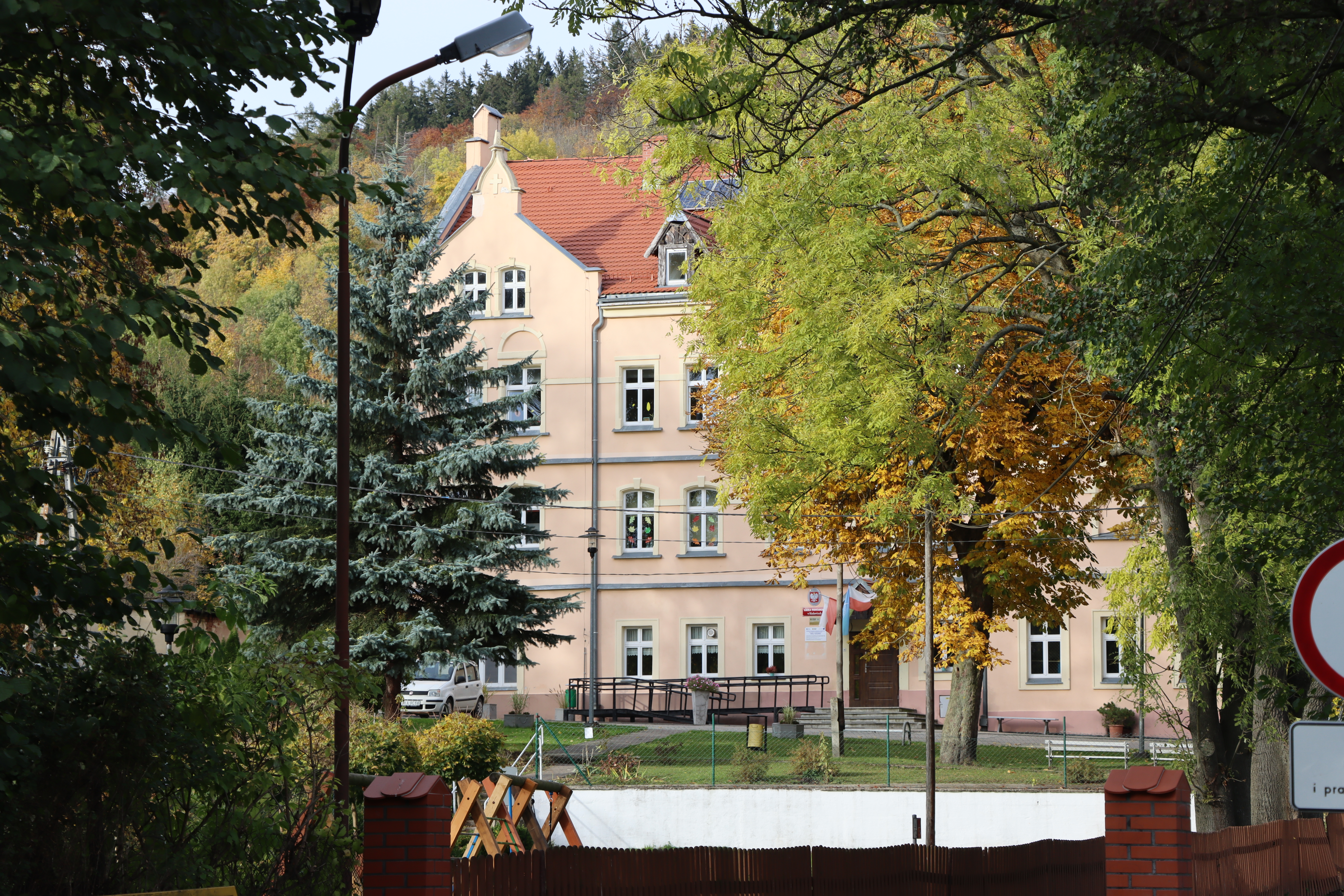
Elementary school

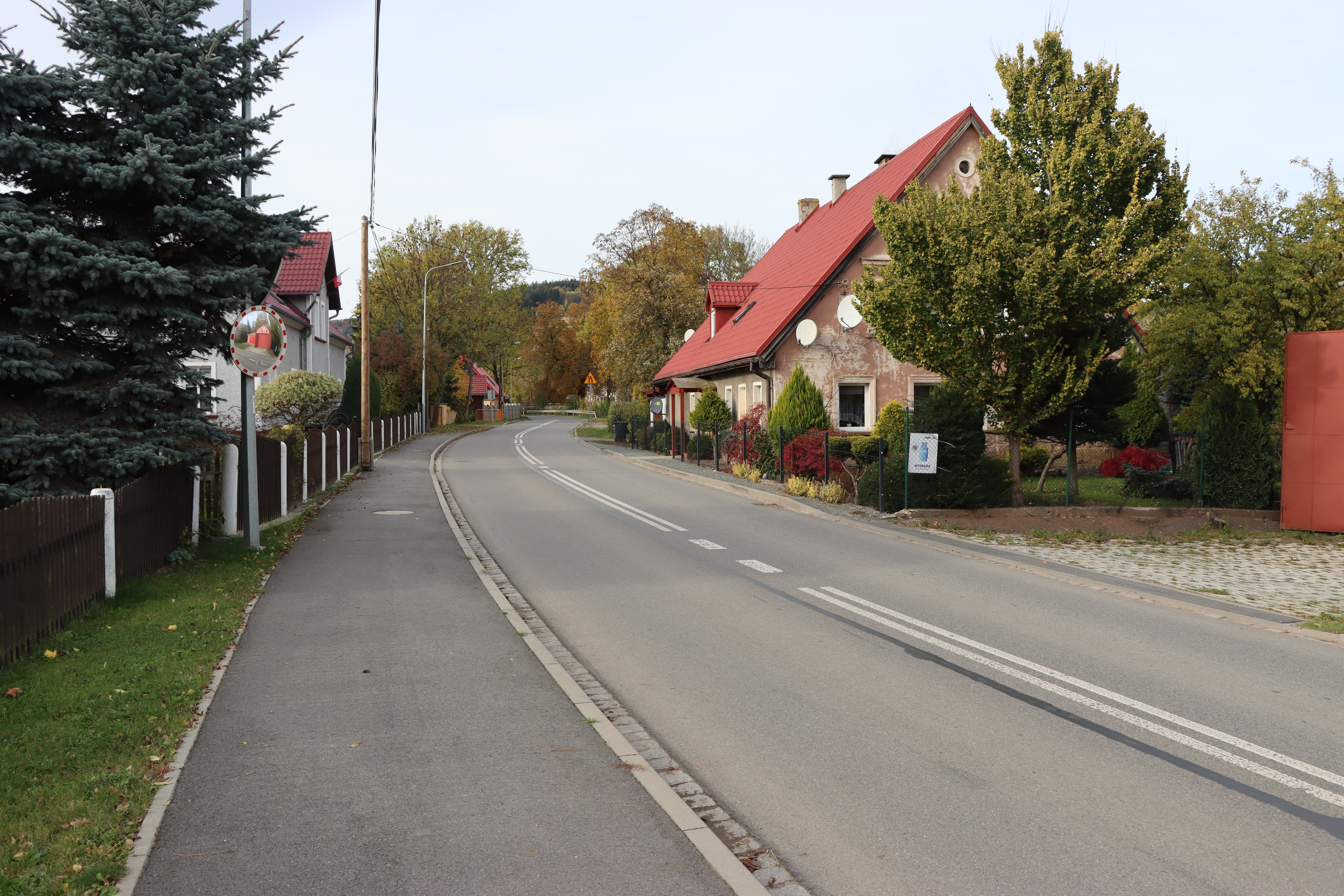
Houses by the main road
