= Niedamirów =

- Village
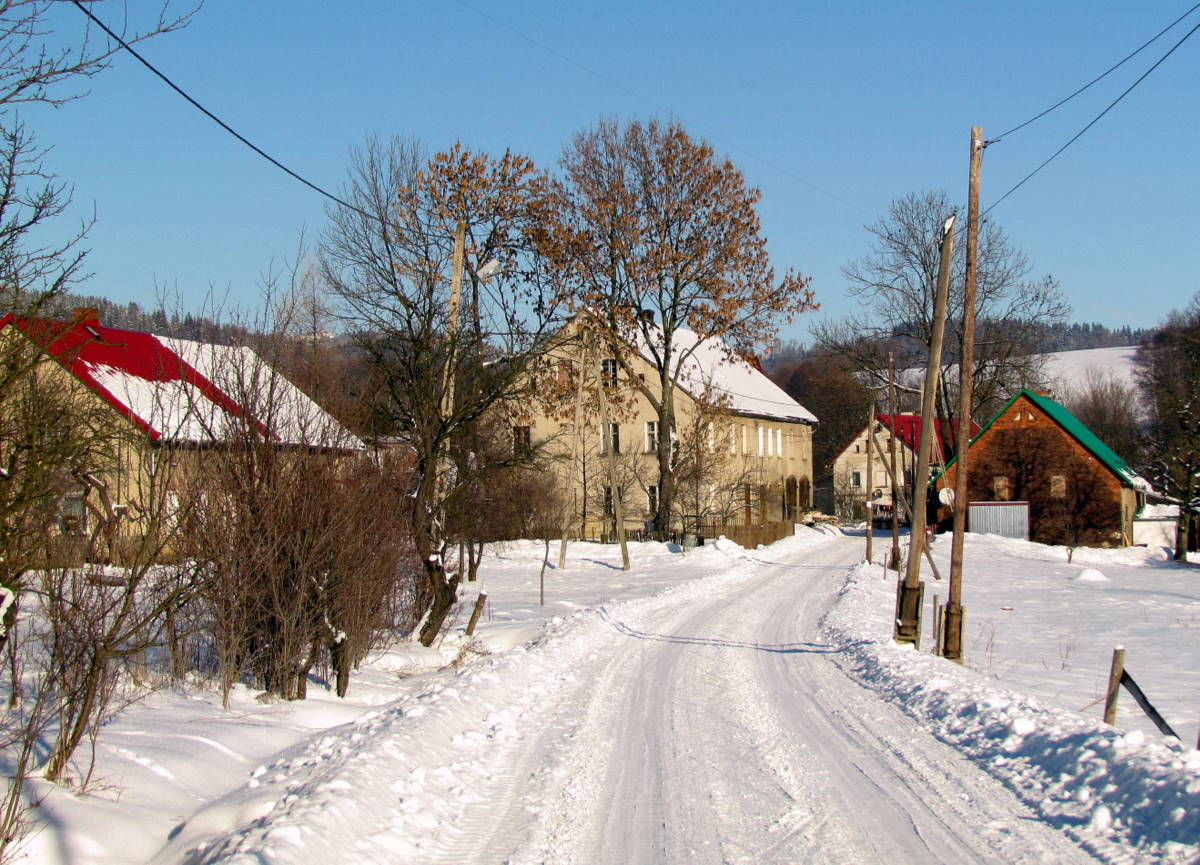
- Houses in the village in 2011

- Location within Poland
- Coordinates: 50°42′N 15°53′E
- Country: Poland
- Voivodeship: Lower Silesian
- County: Kamienna Góra
- Gmina: Lubawka

Niedamirów [ɲɛdaˈmiruf] (German: Kunzendorf) is a village in the administrative district of Gmina Lubawka, within Kamienna Góra County, Lower Silesian Voivodeship, in south-western Poland, near the border with the Czech Republic.

== Gallery ==
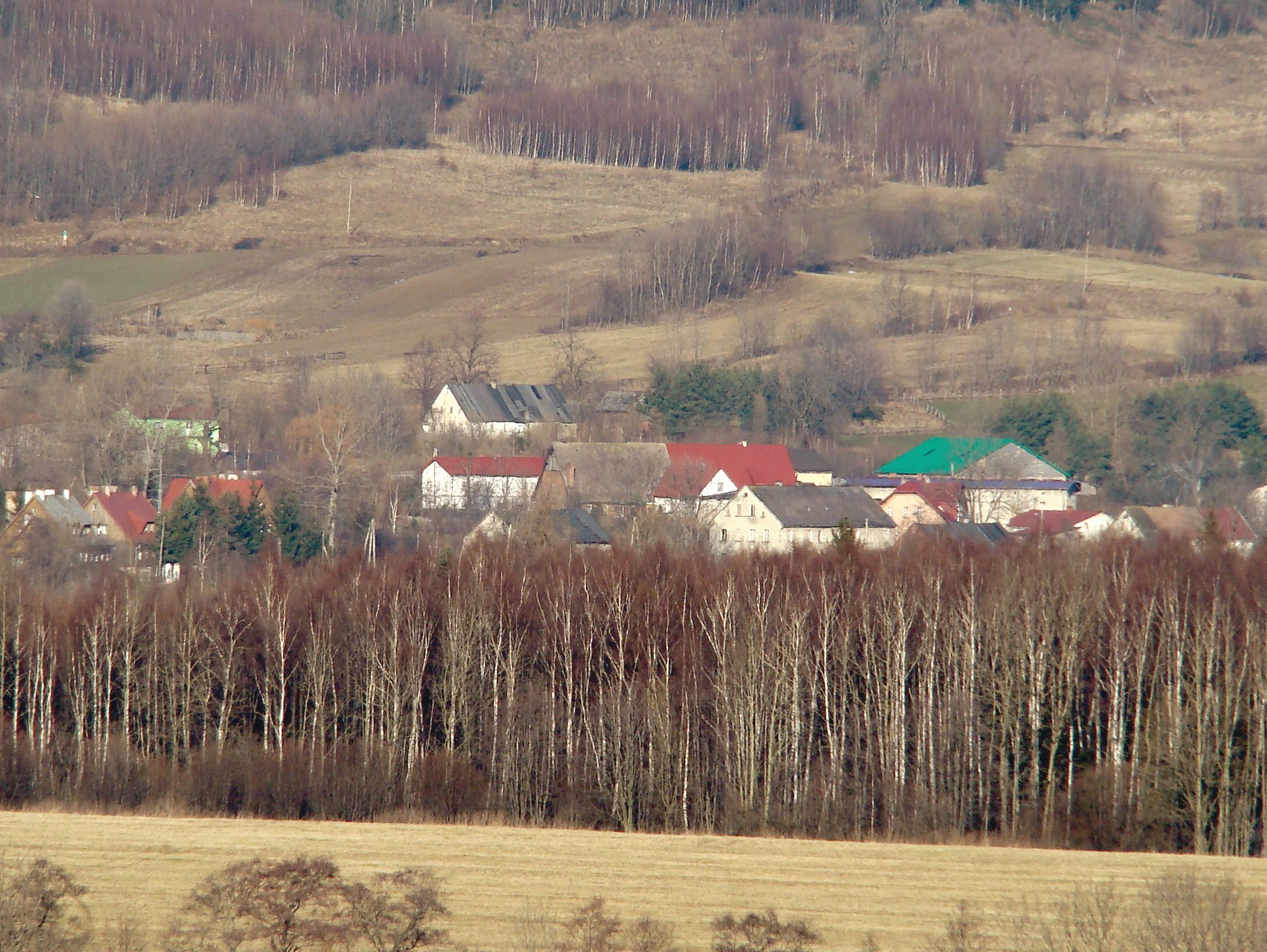
Skyline of Niedamirów

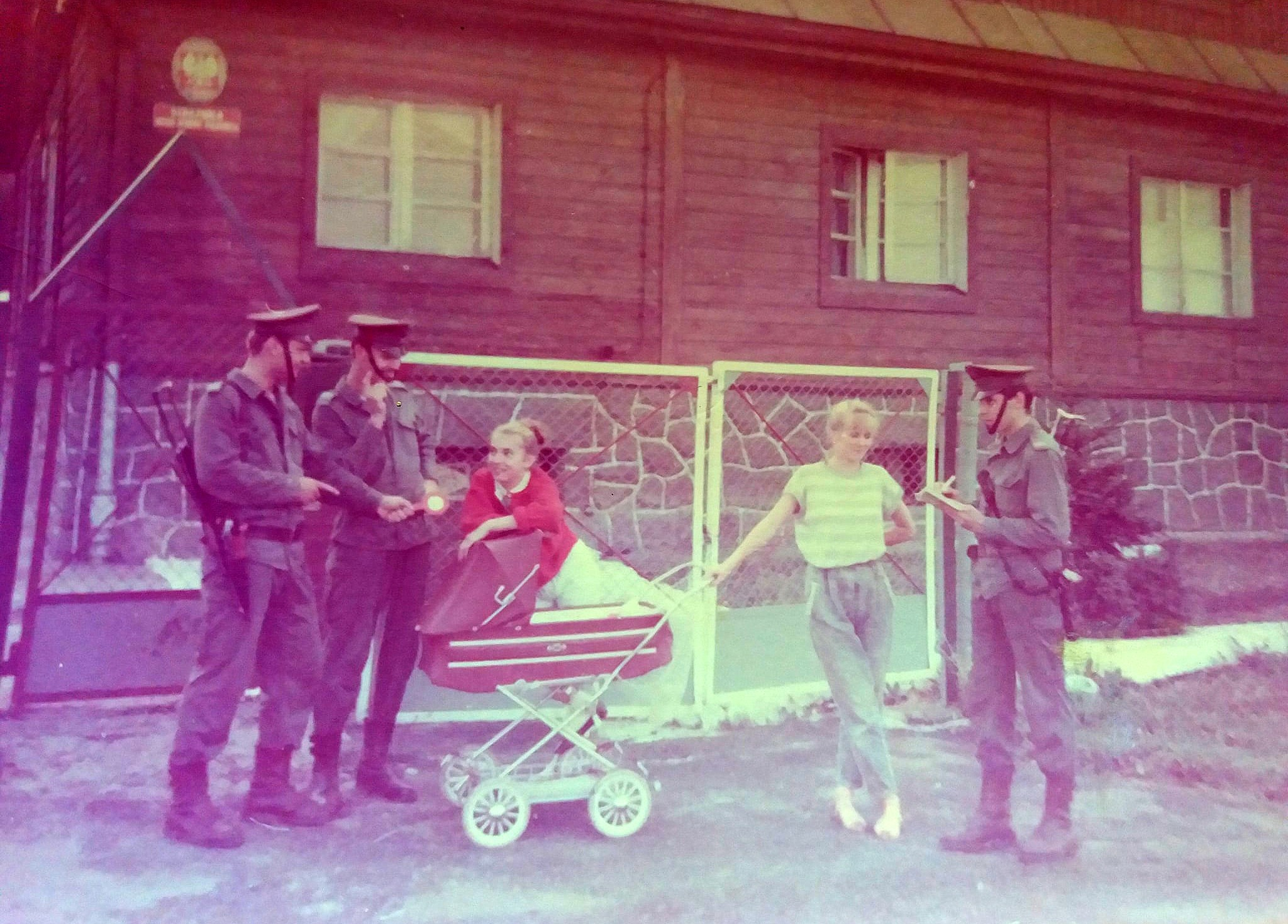
Village residents interact with members of the Strażnica WOP Niedamirów, a local division of the Border Protection Forces, 1990

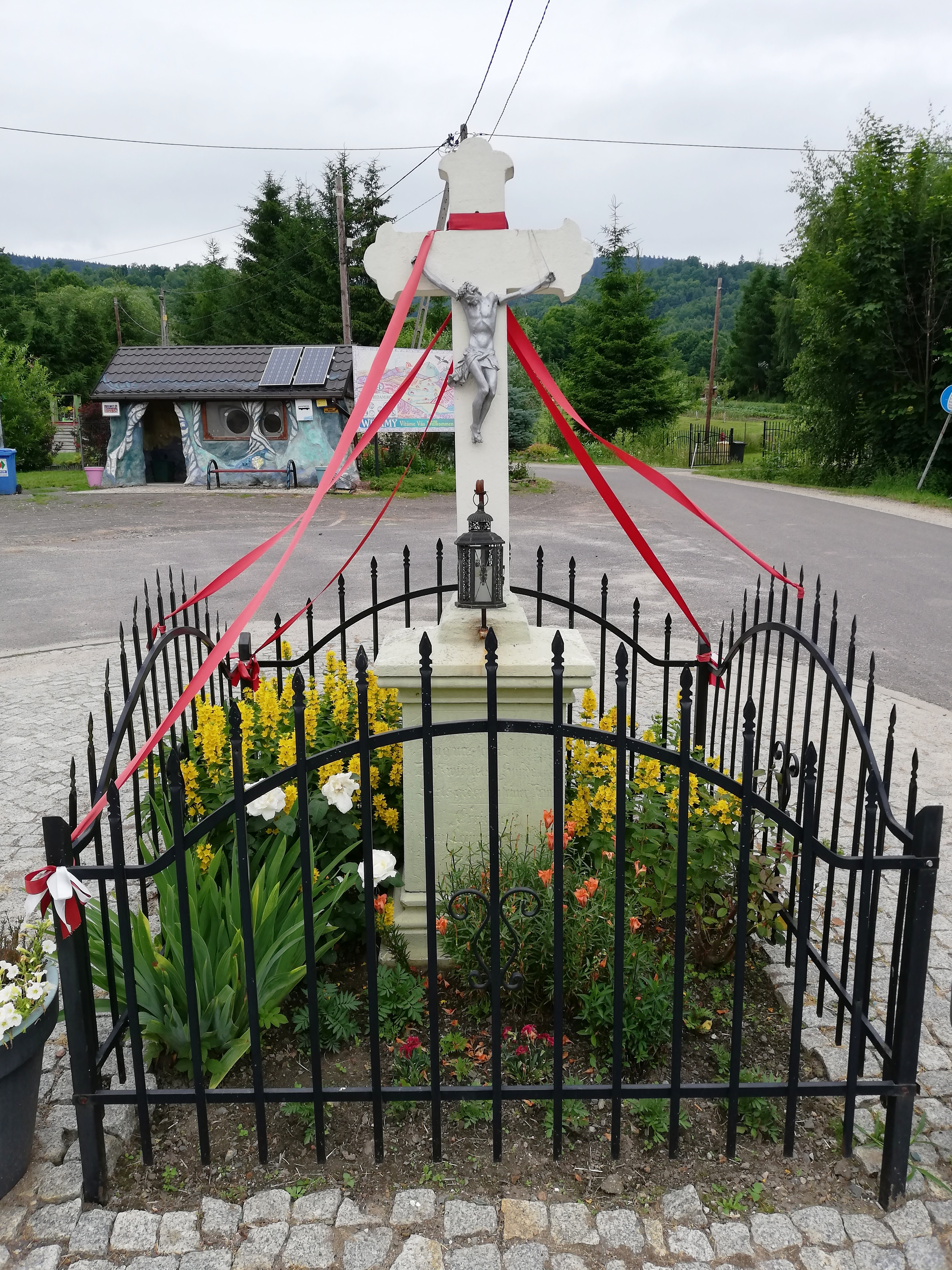
Cross in the center of the village
