= Paprotki, Lower Silesian Voivodeship =

Paprotki
- Village
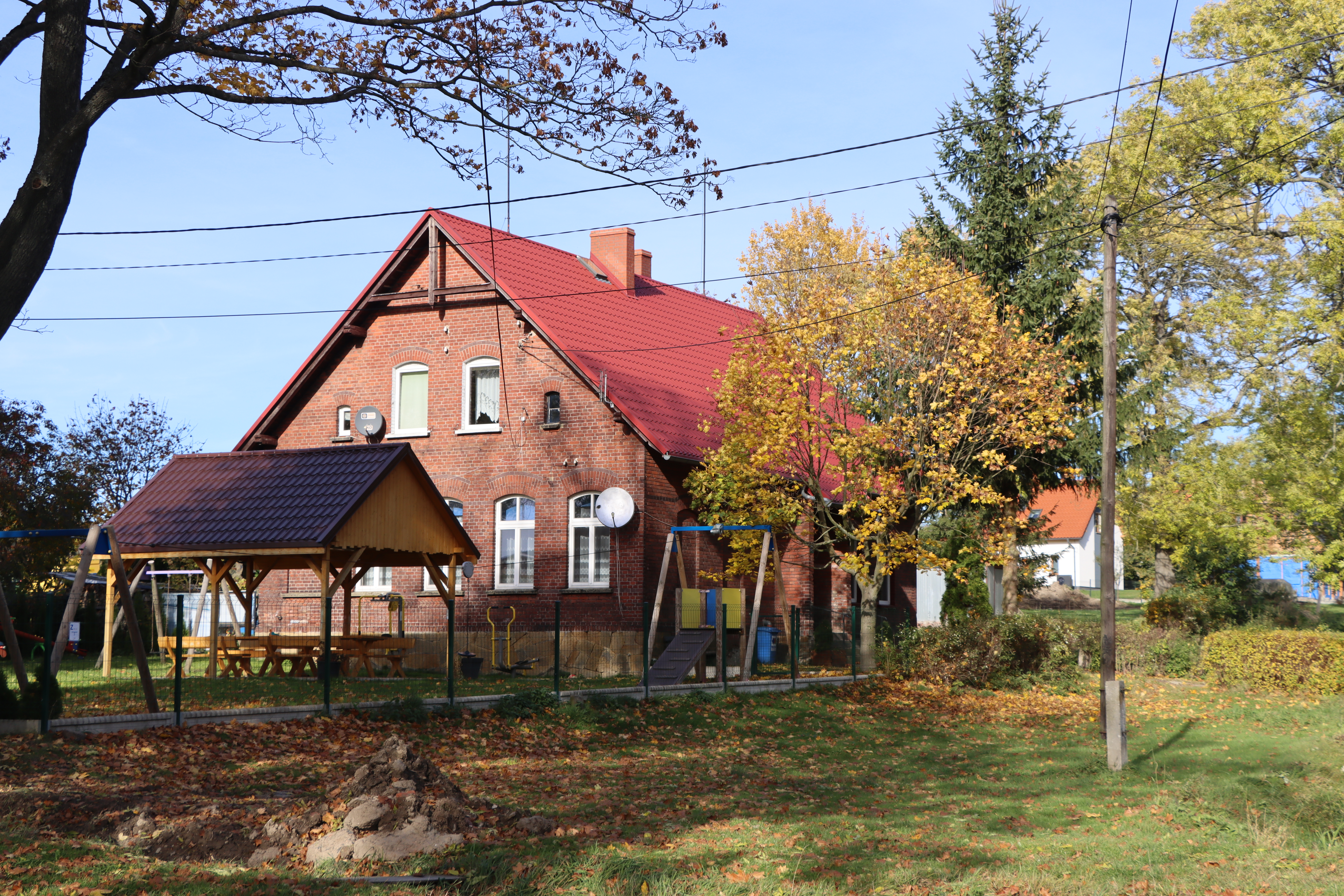
- House with a playground

- Location within Poland
- Coordinates: 50°43′38″N 15°57′06″E
- Country: Poland
- Voivodeship: Lower Silesian
- County: Kamienna Góra
- Gmina: Lubawka

Paprotki [paˈprɔtki] is a village in the administrative district of Gmina Lubawka, within Kamienna Góra County, Lower Silesian Voivodeship, in south-western Poland.

== Gallery ==
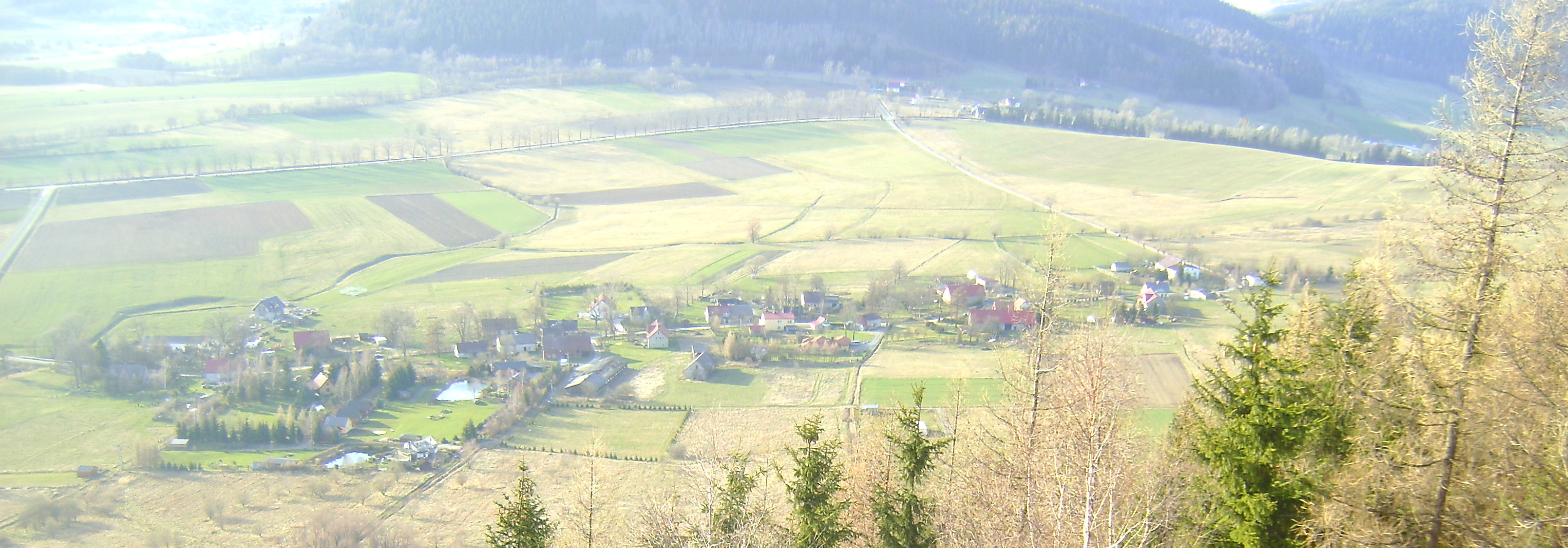
Paprotki from the hill

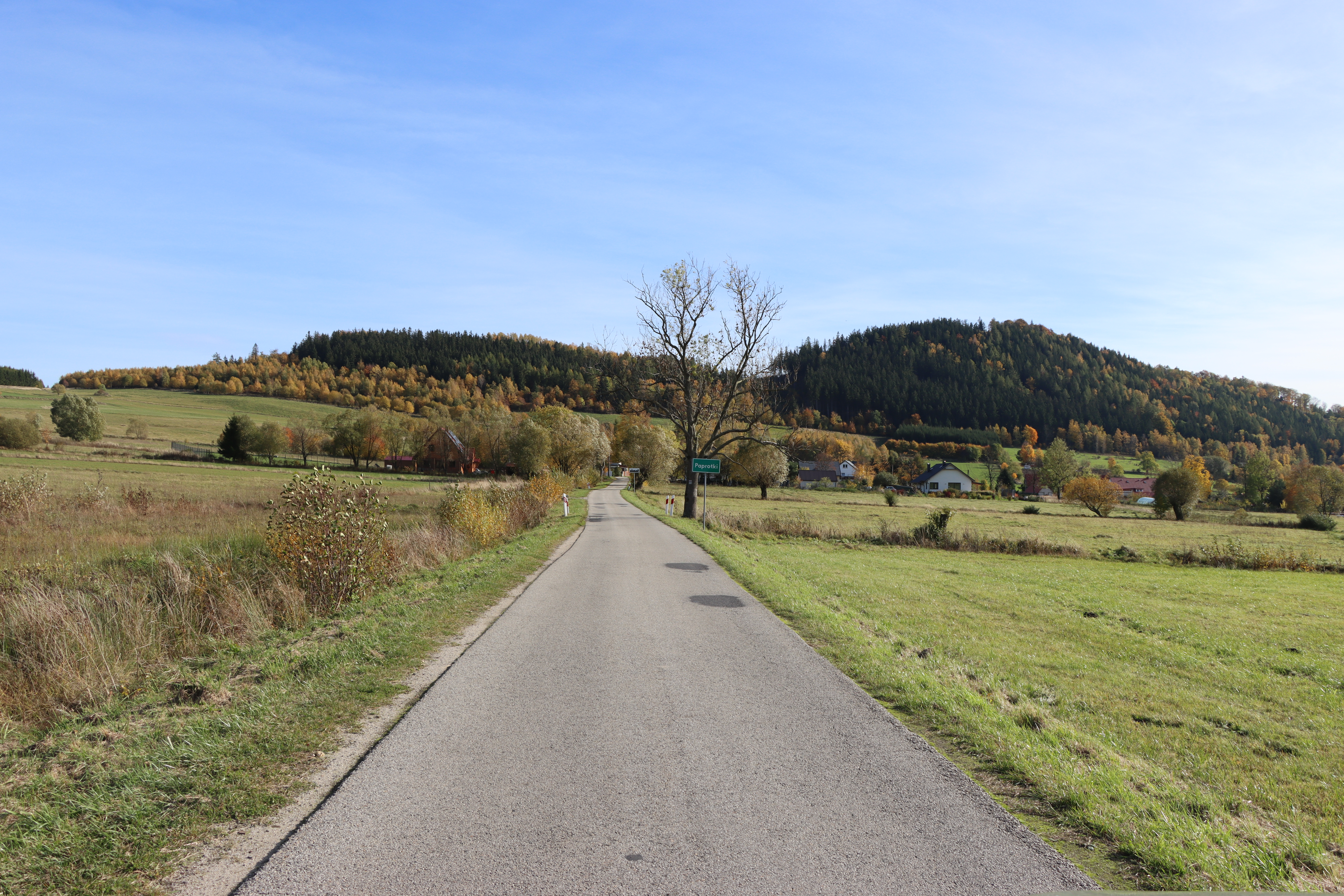
The village from the opposite site

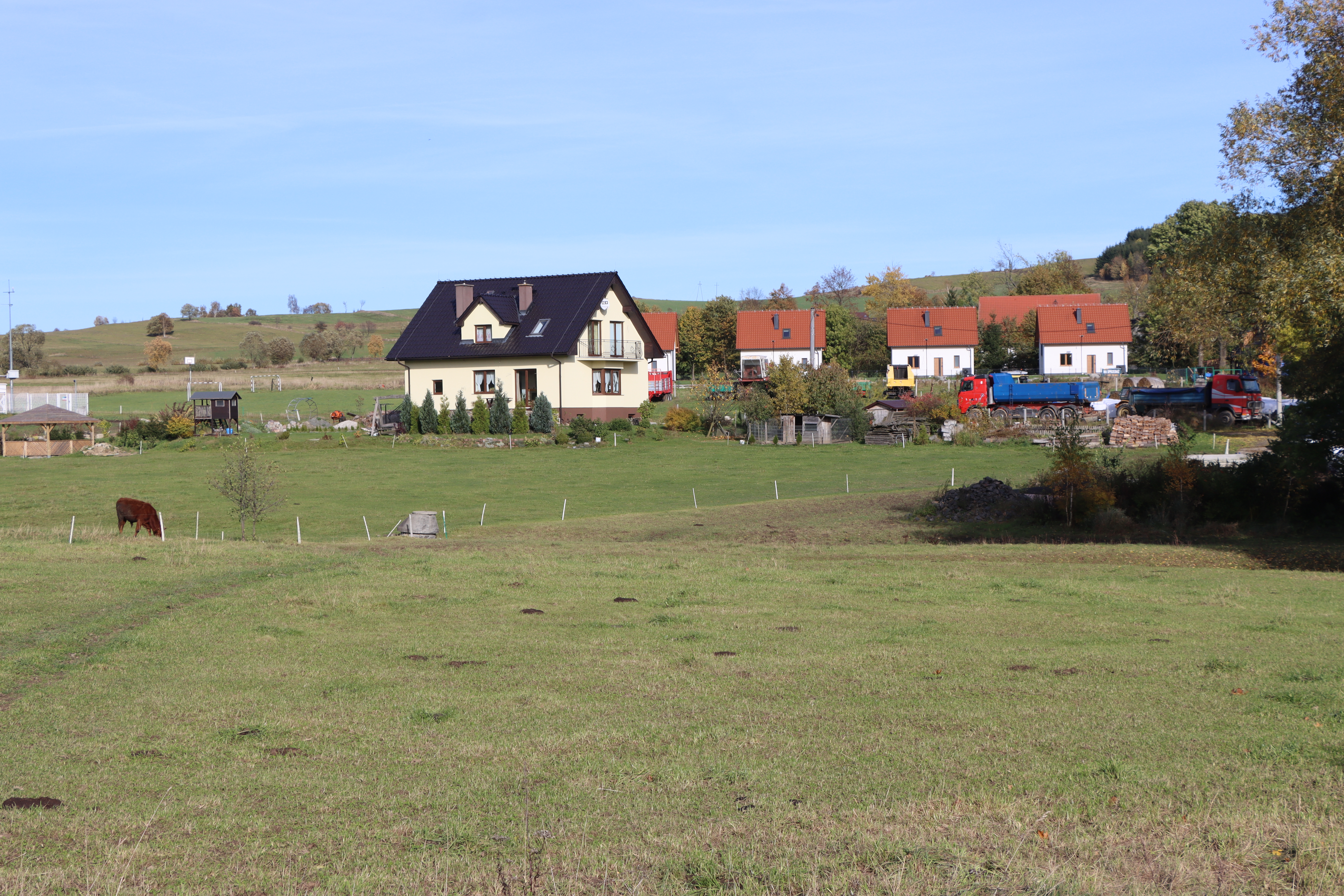
Newer houses (as of 2023)
