= Uniemyśl, Lower Silesian Voivodeship =

Uniemyśl
- Village
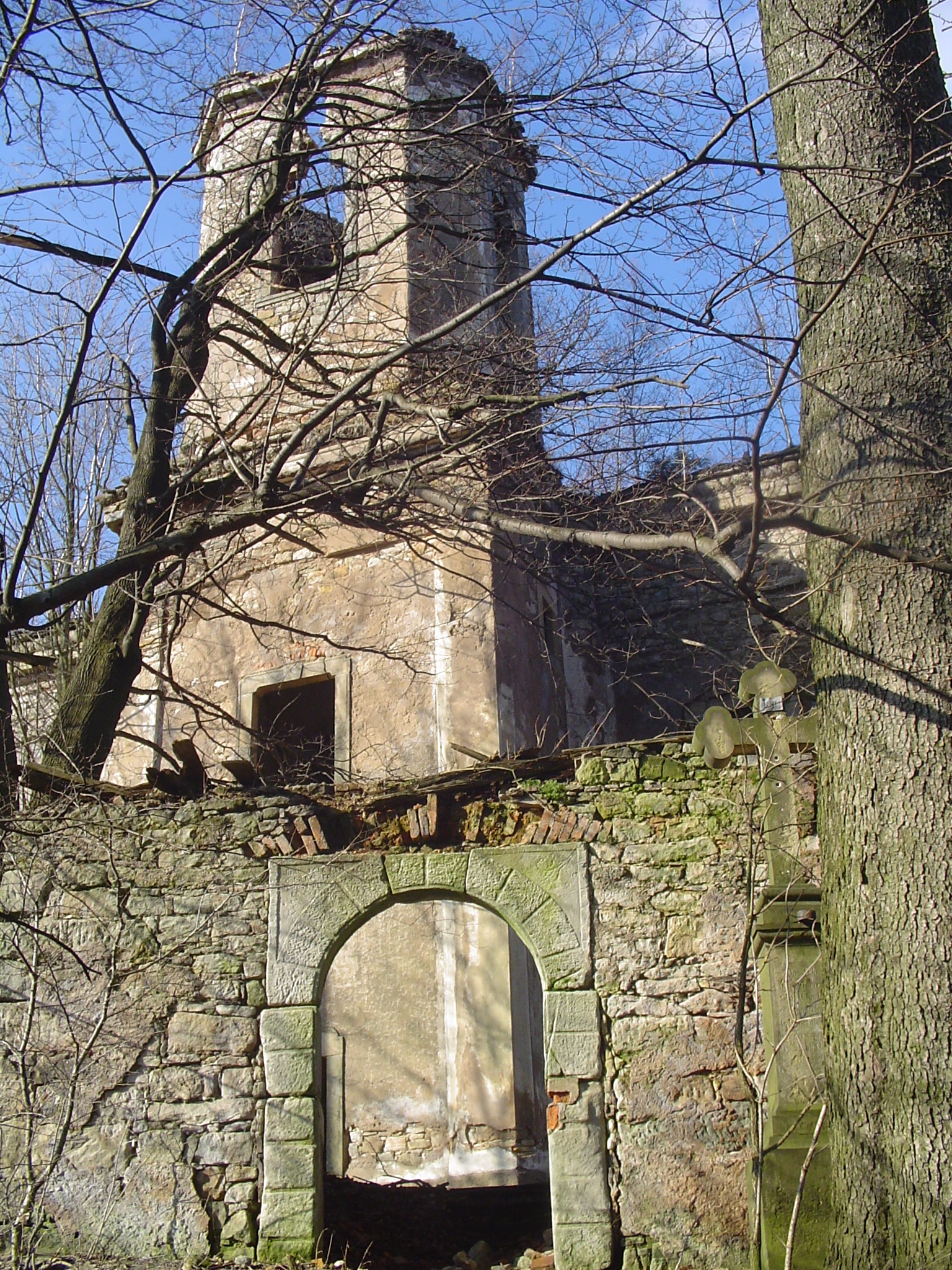
- Ruins of the Church of Saint Matthew

- Location within Poland
- Coordinates: 50°37′49″N 16°02′28″E
- Country: Poland
- Voivodeship: Lower Silesian
- County: Kamienna Góra
- Gmina: Lubawka

Uniemyśl [uˈɲɛmɨɕl] (German: Berthelsdorf) is a village in the administrative district of Gmina Lubawka, within Kamienna Góra County, Lower Silesian Voivodeship, in south-western Poland, near the border with the Czech Republic.
