= Žacléř =

- Town
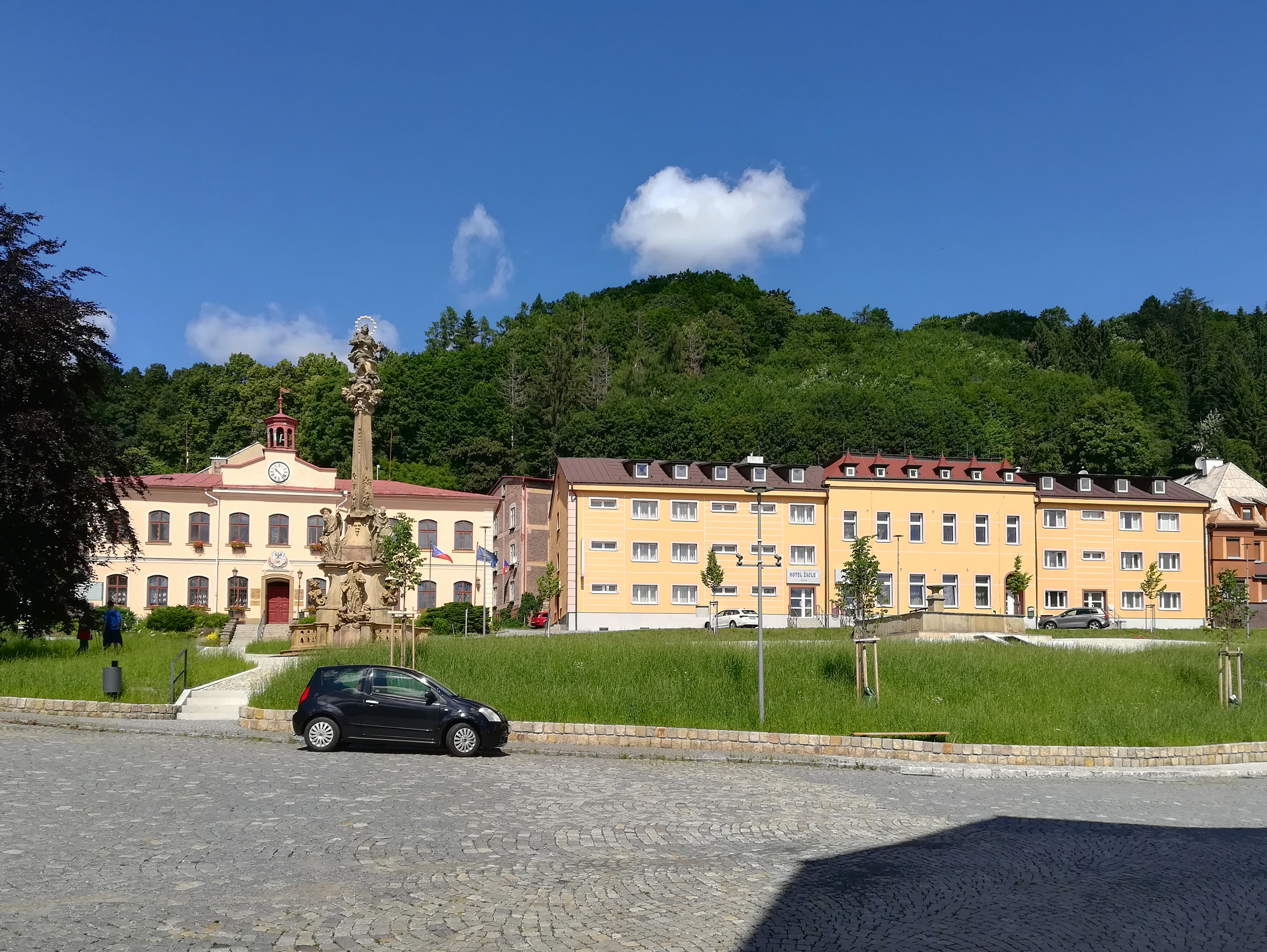
- Town square with the town hall

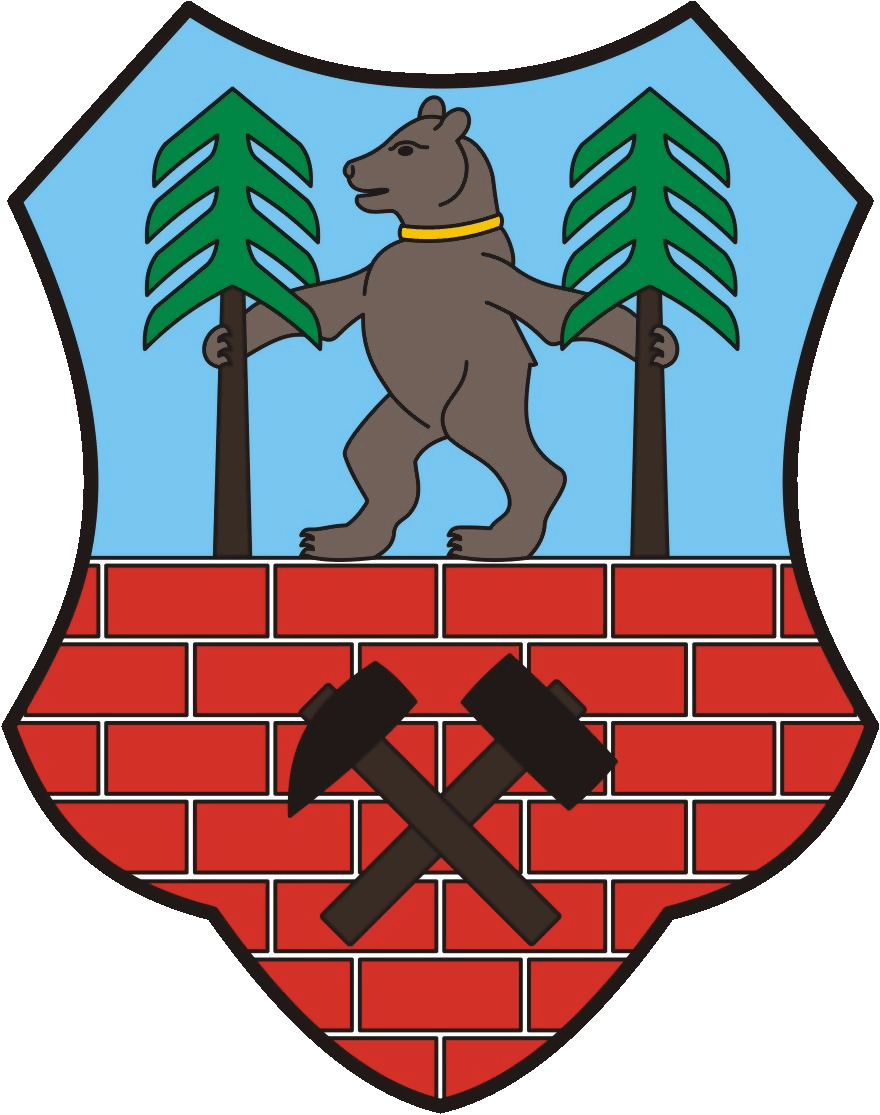
- Flag Coat of arms

- Location in the Czech Republic
- Coordinates: 50°39′49″N 15°54′41″E
- Country: Czech Republic
- Region: Hradec Králové
- District: Trutnov
- First mentioned: 1334

Government
  - Mayor: Aleš Vaníček

Area
  - Total: 21.82 km^{2} (8.42 sq mi)
- Elevation: 612 m (2,008 ft)

Population (2026-01-01)
  - Total: 3,097
  - Density: 141.9/km^{2} (367.6/sq mi)
- Time zone: UTC+1 (CET)
  - Summer (DST): UTC+2 (CEST)
- Postal code: 542 01
- Website: www.zacler.cz

Žacléř (Czech pronunciation: [ˈʒatslɛːr̝̊]; German: Schatzlar) is a town in Trutnov District in the Hradec Králové Region of the Czech Republic. It has about 3,100 inhabitants. The town is located on the border of the Broumov Highlands and Giant Mountains, on the border with Poland. The historic town centre is well preserved and is protected as an urban monument zone.

== Administrative division ==
Žacléř consists of three municipal parts (in brackets population according to the 2021 census):

- Žacléř (2,649)
- Bobr (228)
- Prkenný Důl (16)

== Etymology ==
Initially, the settlement was called Bornflos (meaning 'mountain creek' in Middle High German) and Bernstadt ("Bern's town"), and Schatzlar was only the name of the local castle, but the name of the castle was eventually transferred to the whole town. The origin of the name Schatzlar is unclear. It could be derived from the German word Schatzsammler ('treasure collector') or from the Middle High German words Schatz ('tax', 'fee') and lar ('settlement'). The Czech name Žacléř is a transcription of the German name.

== Geography ==
Žacléř is located about 10 kilometres (6 mi) north of Trutnov and 50 km (31 mi) north of Hradec Králové. It borders Poland to the north. The eastern part of the municipal territory with the built-up area lies in the Broumov Highlands. The western part lies in the Giant Mountains and most of this territory is protected as the Krkonoše National Park. The highest point is the mountain Dvorský les at 1,036 m (3,399 ft) above sea level.

== History ==
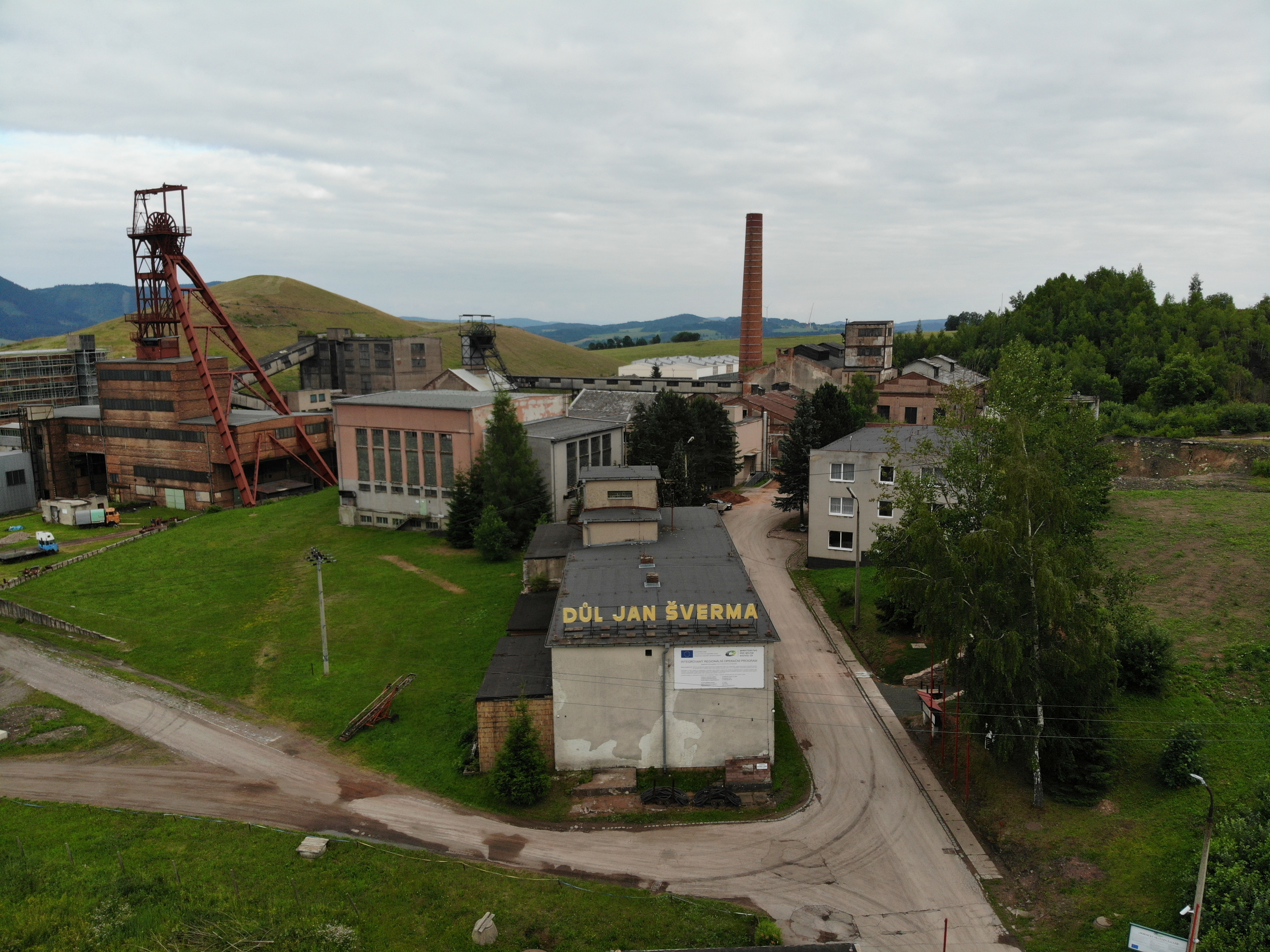
Jan Šverma Mine

Žacléř was founded on the Silesian trail, which was a trade route from Trutnov to Wrocław. A guarding castle for the protection of the trail was built here probably during the reign of King Ottokar II, around 1260. The first written mention of the castle is from 1334.

From 1570, hard coal was mined here and from 1670, beer was brewed here. In the 19th century, the industrialisation occurred. Paper mill, glassworks, and factories for textile, ceramics and soda were founded, but almost all operation ended during the 20th century. In 1992, the coal mining ended.

During World War II, the German occupiers operated a women's subcamp of the Gross-Rosen concentration camp in the town. The prisoners were mostly of Jewish women deported from German-occupied Poland and Hungary. The camp was liberated on 8 May 1945, coincidentally the day of the end of World War II in Europe.

== Demographics ==
Historical population

Year	Pop.	±%
1869	3,937	—
1880	4,562	+15.9%
1890	4,182	−8.3%
1900	5,129	+22.6%
1910	5,499	+7.2%

Year	Pop.	±%
1921	5,225	−5.0%
1930	5,264	+0.7%
1950	3,727	−29.2%
1961	4,766	+27.9%
1970	4,608	−3.3%

Year	Pop.	±%
1980	4,298	−6.7%
1991	3,700	−13.9%
2001	3,633	−1.8%
2011	3,247	−10.6%
2021	2,893	−10.9%

Source: Censuses

== Economy ==
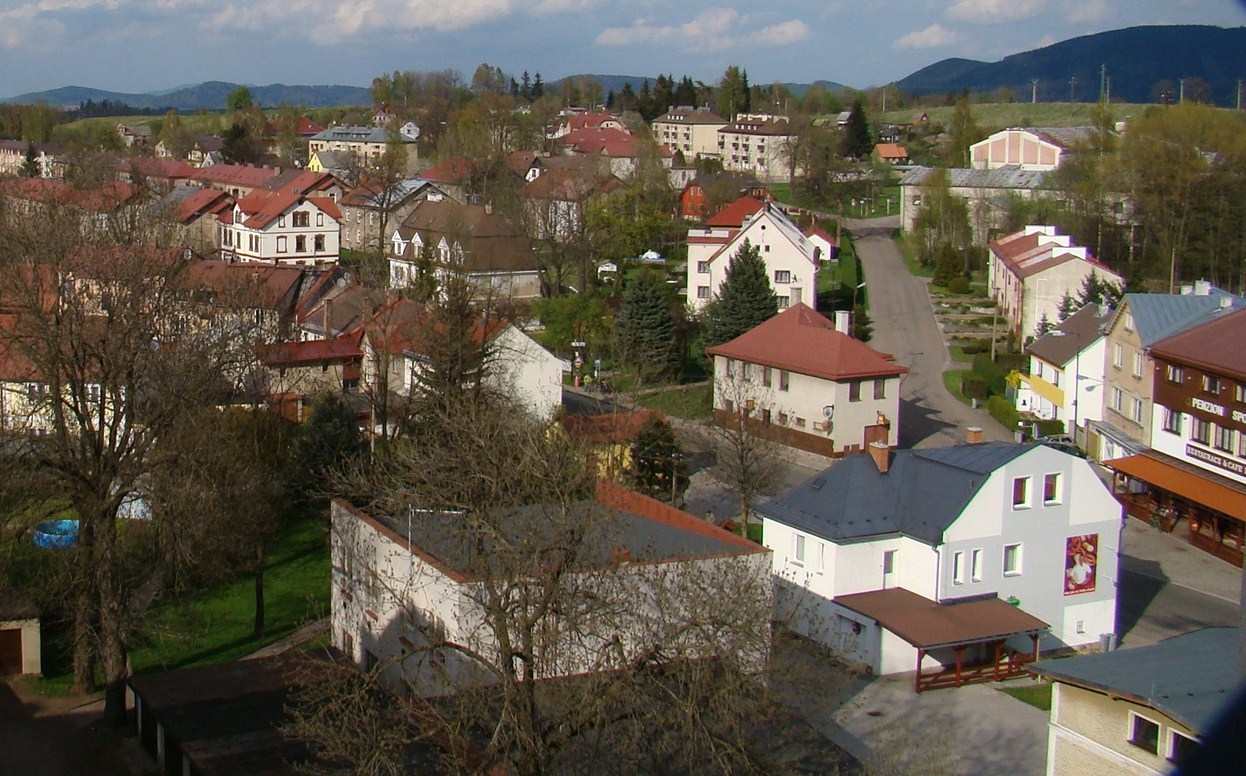
Panorama of Žacléř

The ceramics factory was founded in 1878 and it is the only factory in Žacléř which has survived to this day. Since 1994, the company has been operating under the name Keramtech.

== Transport ==
There are no major roads passing through the municipal territory. The railway that starts here is unused.

== Sights ==
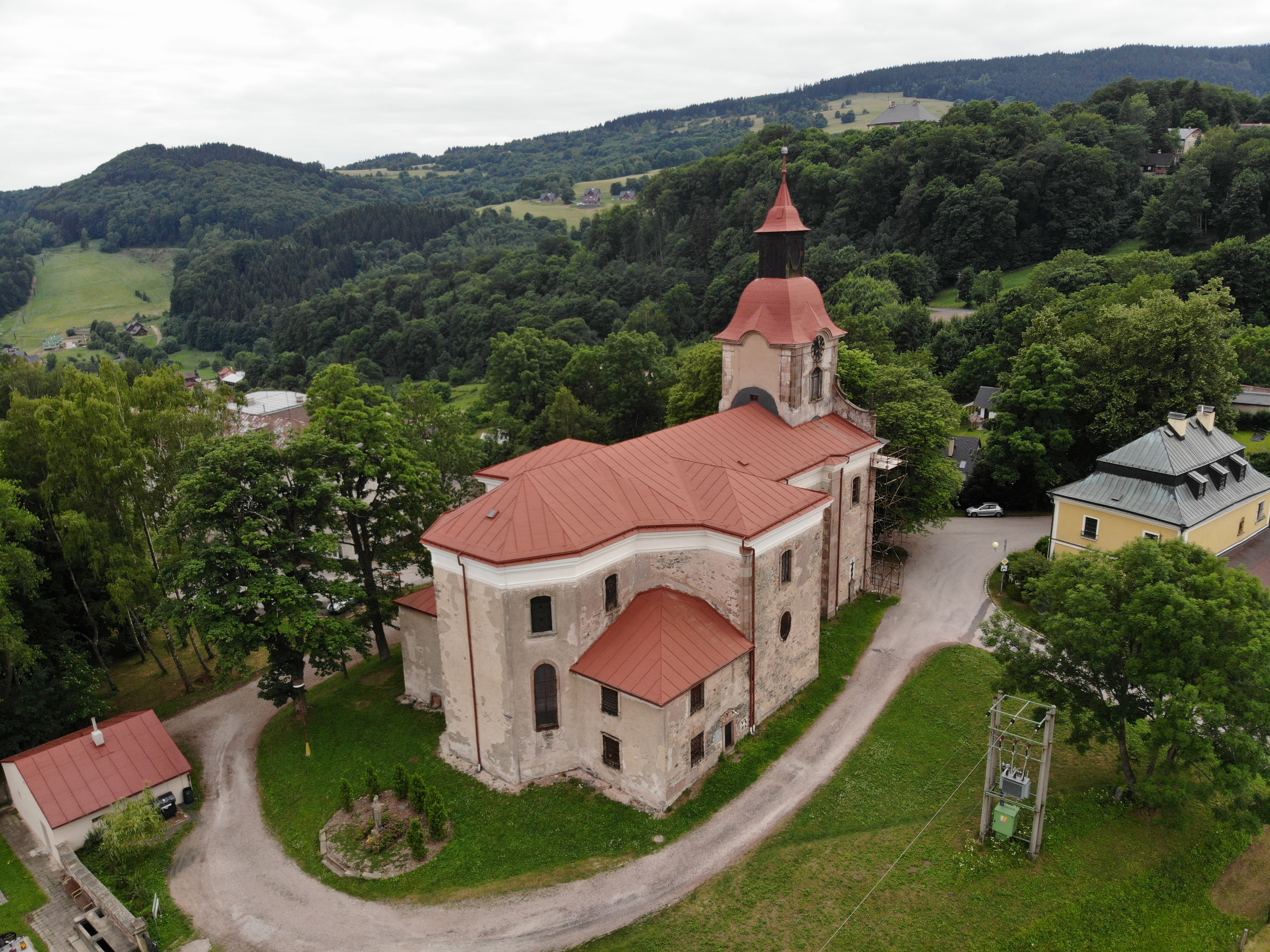
Church of the Holy Trinity

The Church of the Holy Trinity was built by Jesuits in 1677 and rebuilt in the Baroque style in 1732. The rectory next to the church is a late Baroque building from 1793.

The Žacléř Castle was originally a Gothic castle, which burned down in 1523 and was rebuilt in the Renaissance style in the 16th century. It is not accessible to the public.

There is the Mining Open-air Museum Žacléř in the former Jan Šverma Mine. It focuses on the mining equipment and history of mining in Žacléř, and on paleontological findings uncovered during mining. The history of the town and a porcelain collection are shown in the Town Museum.

== Twin towns – sister cities ==
Žacléř is twinned with:

- Goldkronach, Germany
- Kowary, Poland
- Lubawka, Poland
