= Burgruine Schaumburg =

Castle ruin in Carinthia, Austria

- Carinthia, Austria
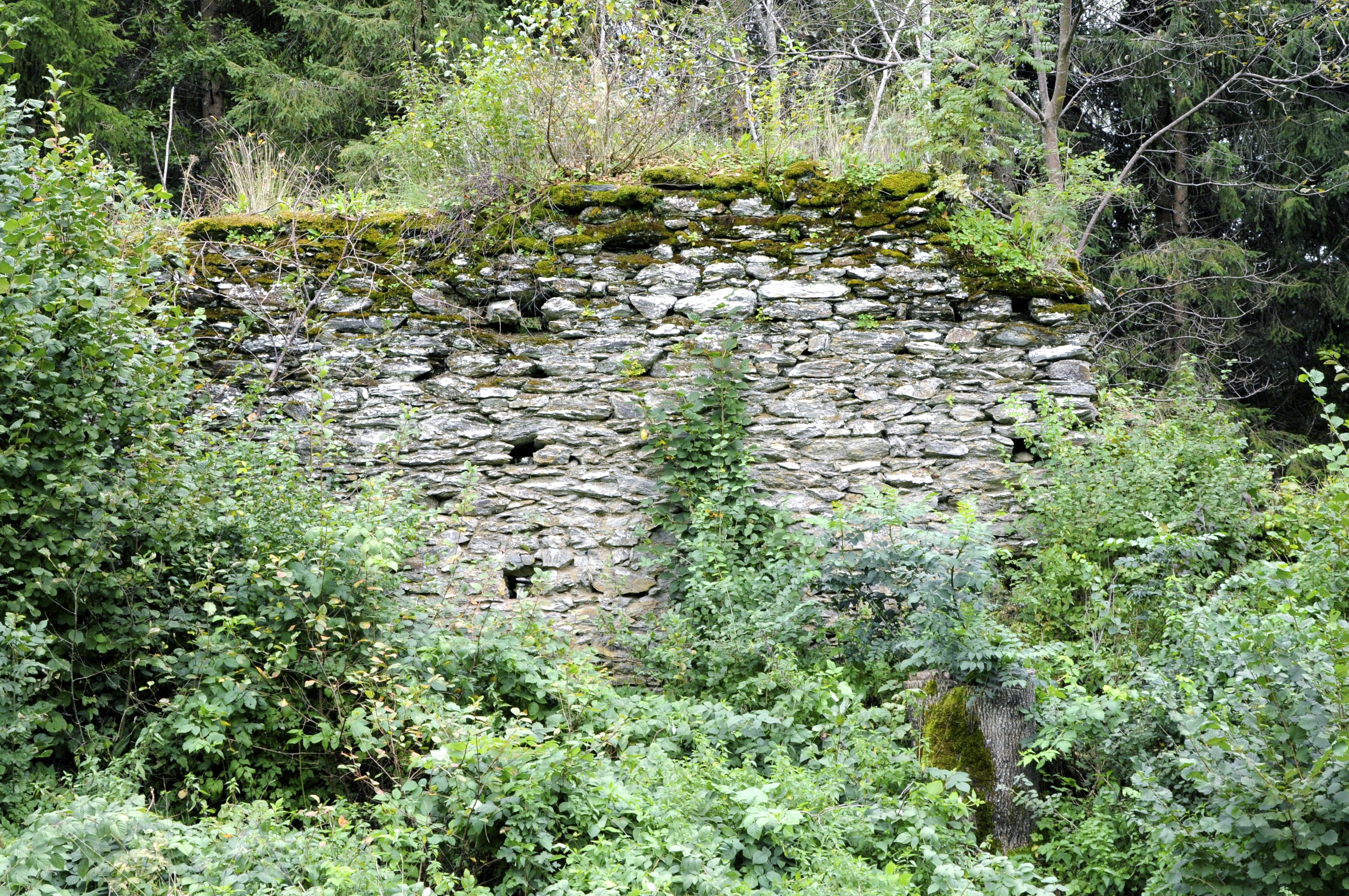

Site information
- Type: Castle

Site history
- Built: c. 1150

Burgruine Schaumburg is a castle in Carinthia, Austria.

== See also ==
- List of castles in Austria
