= Błażkowa, Lower Silesian Voivodeship =

Błażkowa
- Village
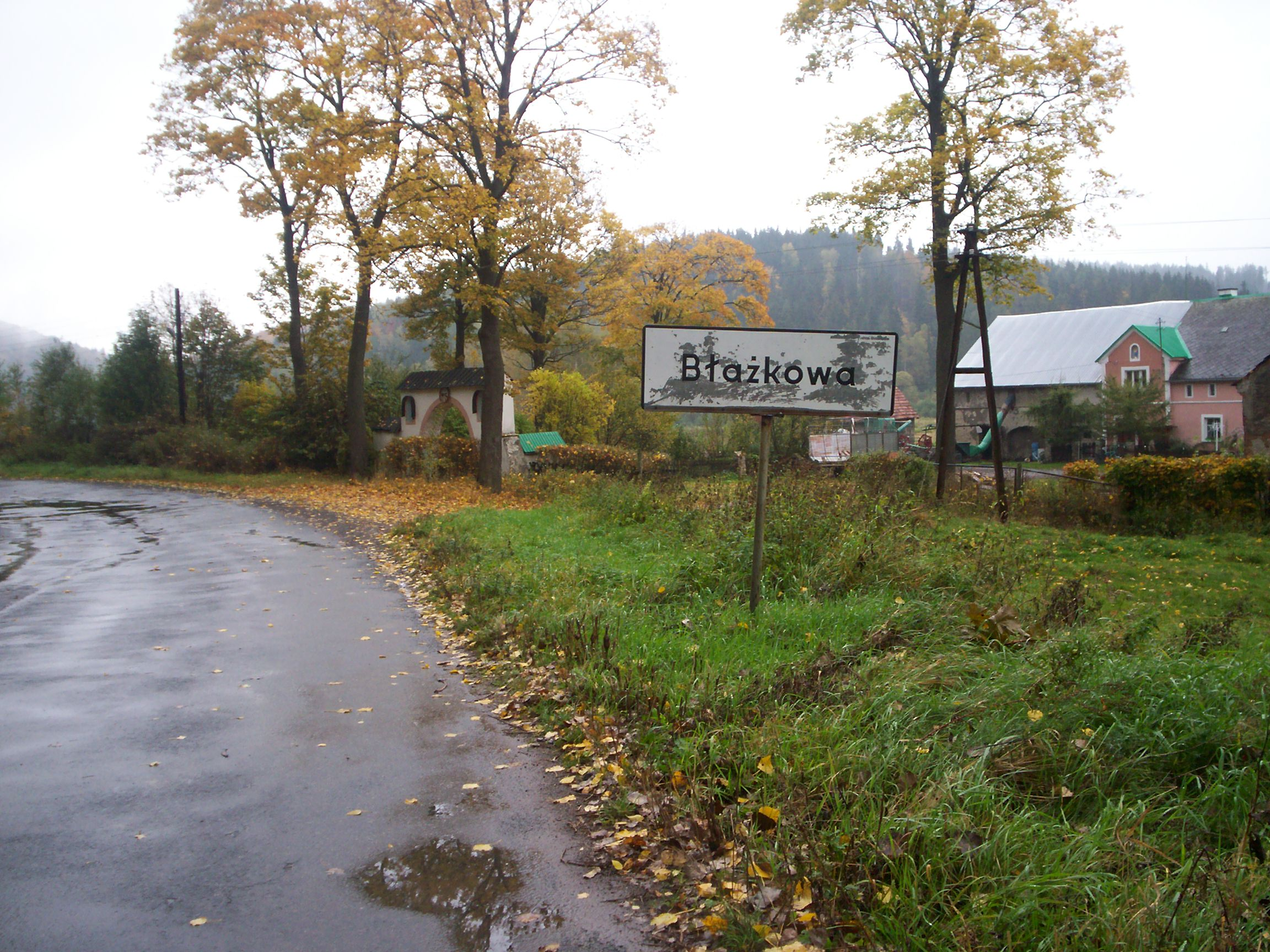

- Location within Poland
- Coordinates: 50°44′38″N 15°59′12″E
- Country: Poland
- Voivodeship: Lower Silesian
- County: Kamienna Góra
- Gmina: Lubawka

Błażkowa [bwaʂˈkɔva] is a village in the administrative district of Gmina Lubawka, within Kamienna Góra County, Lower Silesian Voivodeship, in south-western Poland.
