= Shamberg =

Shamberg is a surname. Notable people with the surname include:

- Michael Shamberg (born c. 1945), American film producer and writer
- Michael H. Shamberg (1952–2014), American music video producer and filmmaker

== See also ==
- Samberg
- Schamberg disease
- Schomberg (disambiguation)
