= Chełmsko Śląskie =

- Village
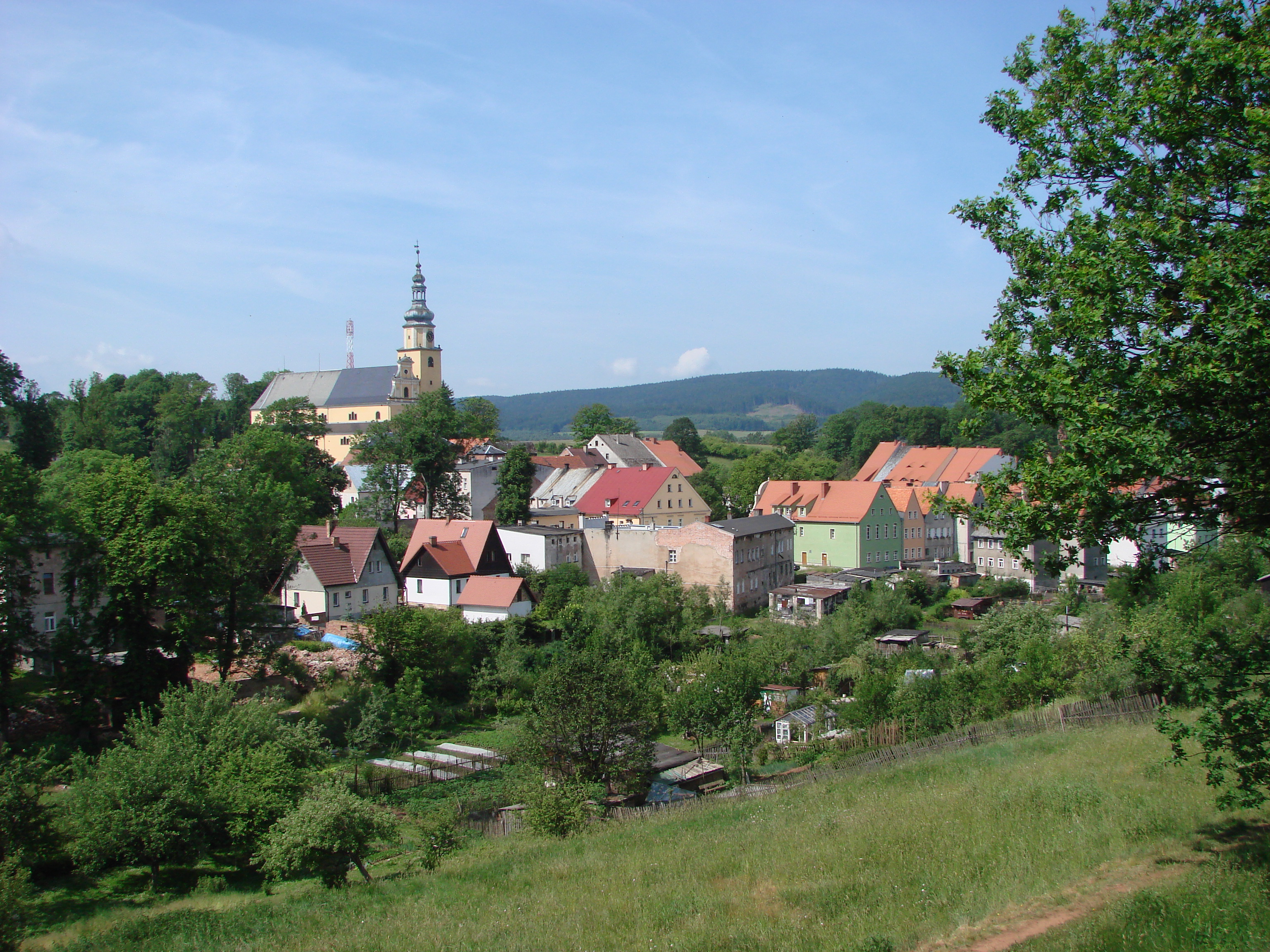
- View of Chełmsko Śląskie with the Holy Family church

- Location within Poland
- Coordinates: 50°40′N 16°4′E
- Country: Poland
- Voivodeship: Lower Silesian
- County: Kamienna Góra
- Gmina: Lubawka
- First mentioned: 13th century

Population
  - Total: 1,900
- Time zone: UTC+1 (CET)
  - Summer (DST): UTC+2 (CEST)
- Postal code: 58-407
- Vehicle registration: DKA

Chełmsko Śląskie [ˈxɛu̯mskɔ ˈɕlɔ̃skʲɛ] (German: Schömberg) is a village in the administrative district of Gmina Lubawka, within Kamienna Góra County, Lower Silesian Voivodeship, in south-western Poland, near the border with the Czech Republic.

== History ==
Local traditions associate the town with a fortified site (gród) supposedly established in 1207 by Duke Henry I the Bearded, but this mention is considered legendary. The verifiable history begins in the late 13th century. The founding of the planned settlement is traditionally attributed to the Moravian nobleman Egidius von Aupa (Idzi z Ołpy/Aupy), mainly because he was active as a coloniser in the neighbouring Bohemian border region (especially around Trutnov/Aupa). The place was named after its “beautiful mountain location”, with the first documented appearance of the German name in 1289 as Shonenberch (or similar variants like Schönenberg) in a charter from King Wenceslaus II of Bohemia. By the late 13th century, the settlement appears in sources as an oppidum. In 1289, King Wenceslaus II transferred the settlement (along with surrounding villages) to Duke Bolko I the Strict of Świdnica and Jawor and authorised him to grant it town rights. In 1343, the Cistercian monastery of Krzeszów/Grüssau acquired the town and shaped its further economic and ecclesiastical development. Schönberg developed into a small craft and agricultural town with a regular layout and fortifications.

After the Reformation, the residents became Protestant. Despite oppression by the Abbey and Recatholication policies in Austrian-ruled Silesia, the residents stuck to their Protestant faith. Despite order by Rudolf II to respect Protestants, the Abbey assigned a Catholic priest to the town in 1619. In the 18th century, the town was annexed by Prussia and from 1871 it formed part of unified Germany. It was one of the locations of the Silesian weavers' uprising of 1793, brutally crushed by Prussian troops.

During World War II the German Nazi government established and operated a branch of the Gross-Rosen concentration camp in the town. During the war, the historical fabric of the village suffered virtually no damage.

For a time, the village was called Szymrych, and Polish resettlers from the Soviet-annexed former eastern territories and the Carpathians arrived. Under the imposed Communist regime, there was a negative attitude towards the legacy of the previous population for ideological reasons. Several buildings were destroyed. The Protestant church was used as a storehouse and the four hotels of the town disappeared. Over the years, attitude of the new citizens to the village past evolved from hostility over adaption and acclimatisation to adaption.

== Sights ==
Chełmsko Śląskie contains numerous historic buildings and structures, the oldest dating back to the Middle Ages.

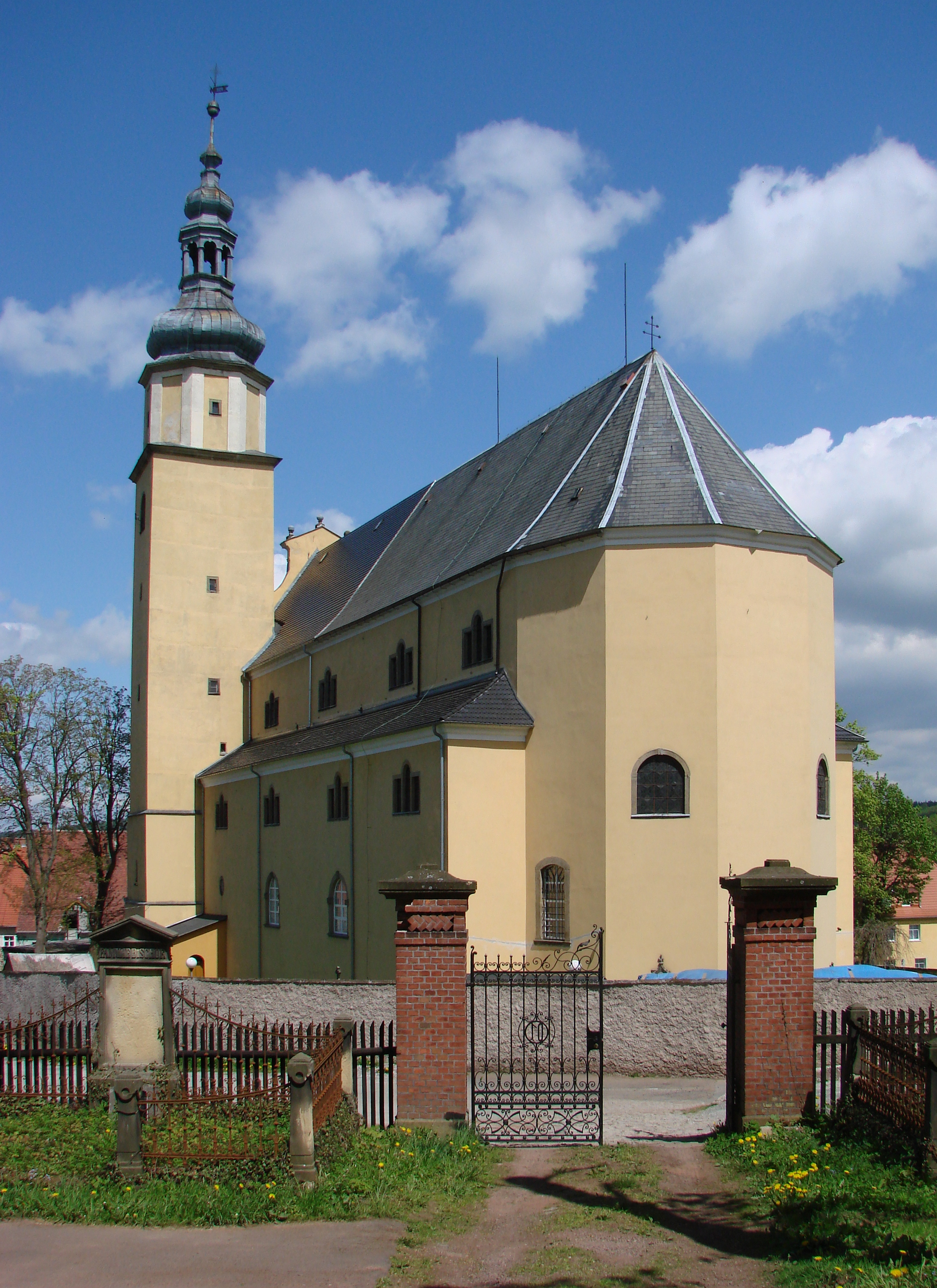
Baroque Holy Family church

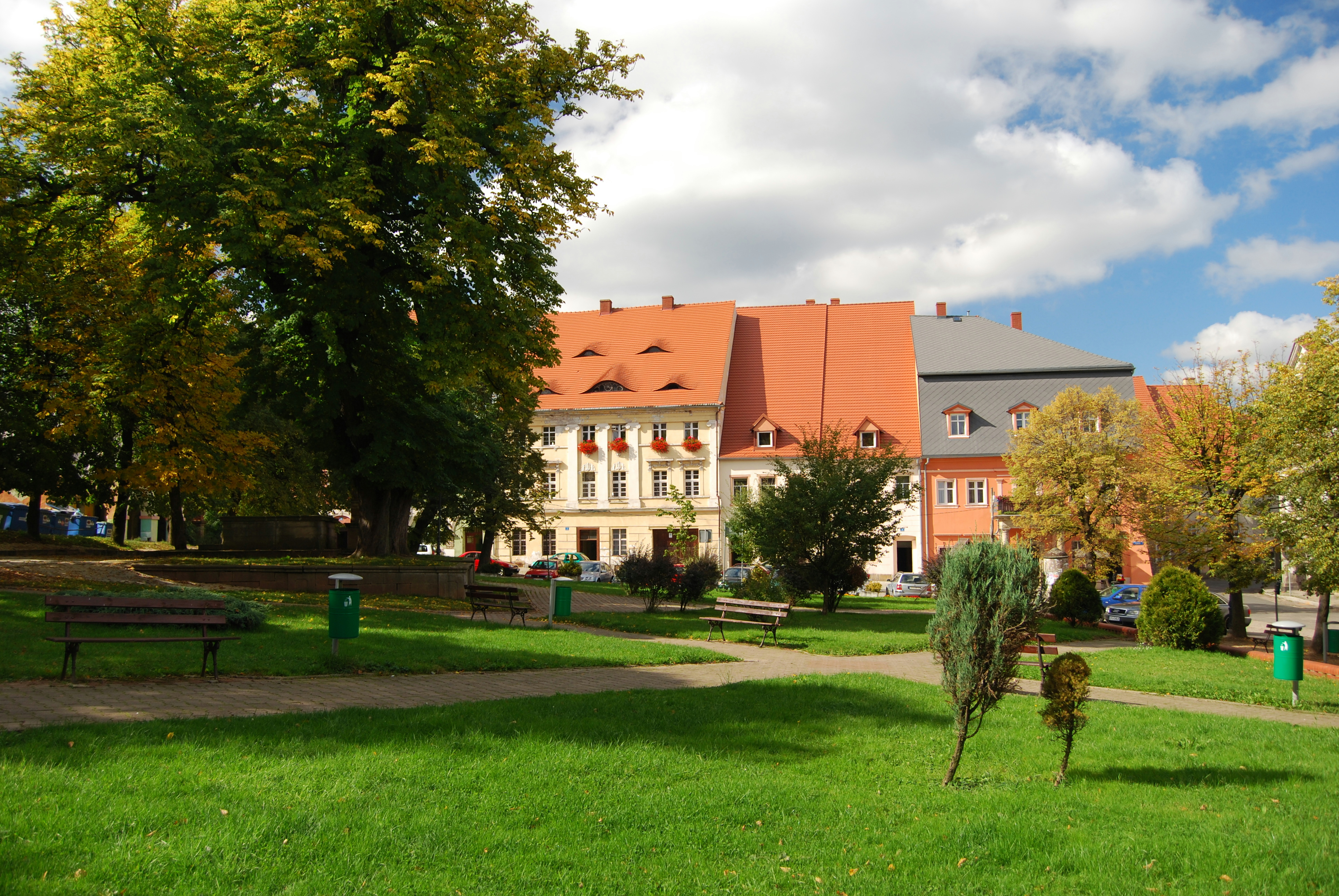
Market Square (Rynek) with historic townhouses

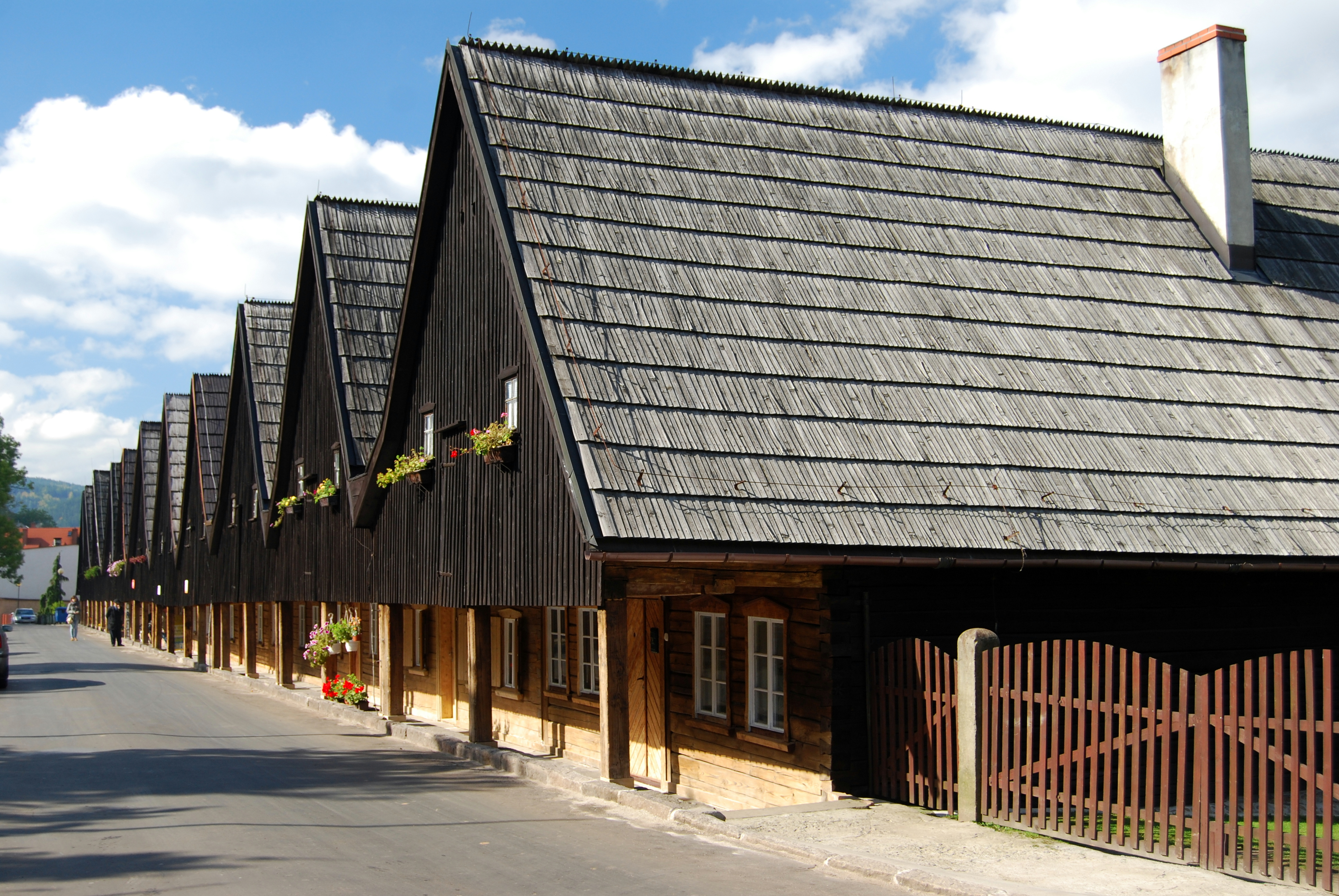
Old weavers houses from 1707, called the Twelve Apostles

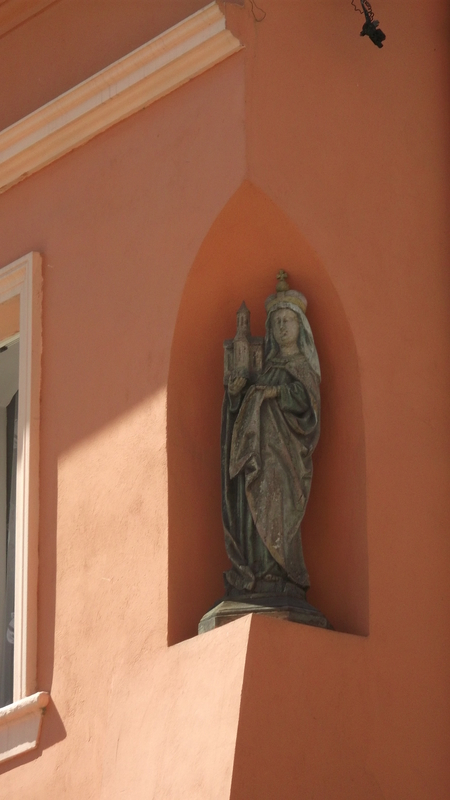
Gothic sculpture of Hedwig of Silesia, High Duchess consort of Poland and patron saint of Silesia, at the Market Square

Arcade house, Rynek 21

Twelve Apostles

Protestant church
