= Ramlinsburg =

- Municipality
- Coat of arms
- Location of Ramlinsburg
- Location within Switzerland Location within Canton of Basel-Landschaft
- Coordinates: 47°27′N 7°46′E
- Country: Switzerland
- Canton: Basel-Landschaft
- District: Liestal

Area
  - Total: 2.24 km^{2} (0.86 sq mi)
- Elevation: 494 m (1,621 ft)

Population (June 2021)
  - Total: 729
  - Density: 325/km^{2} (843/sq mi)
- Time zone: UTC+01:00 (CET)
  - Summer (DST): UTC+02:00 (CEST)
- Postal code: 4433
- SFOS number: 2832
- ISO 3166 code: CH-BL
- Surrounded by: Bubendorf, Hölstein, Itingen, Lausen, Zunzgen
- Website: ramlinsburg.ch

Ramlinsburg is a municipality in the district of Liestal in the canton of Basel-Country in Switzerland.

== History ==
Ramlinsburg is first mentioned in 1367 as Remlisperg. It was located near the Bubendorf courthouse and belonged to the Salland.

In the 15th century, Henman Sevogel, Lord of the Castle Wildenstein (located between Bubendorf and Ziefen), was the owner of the Salland region. He passed the ownership of Ramlinsburg to the Basel Bishops.

For many years, the town consisted of just two independent farms, Ober- (upper) and Niederramlisberg (lower Ramlisberg). Today, these are called Oberhof and Niderhof. In the 16th century, a town began to develop around these two farms.

The two regions remained independent until 1926, when they were merged to create the community of Ramlinsburg.

== Geography ==
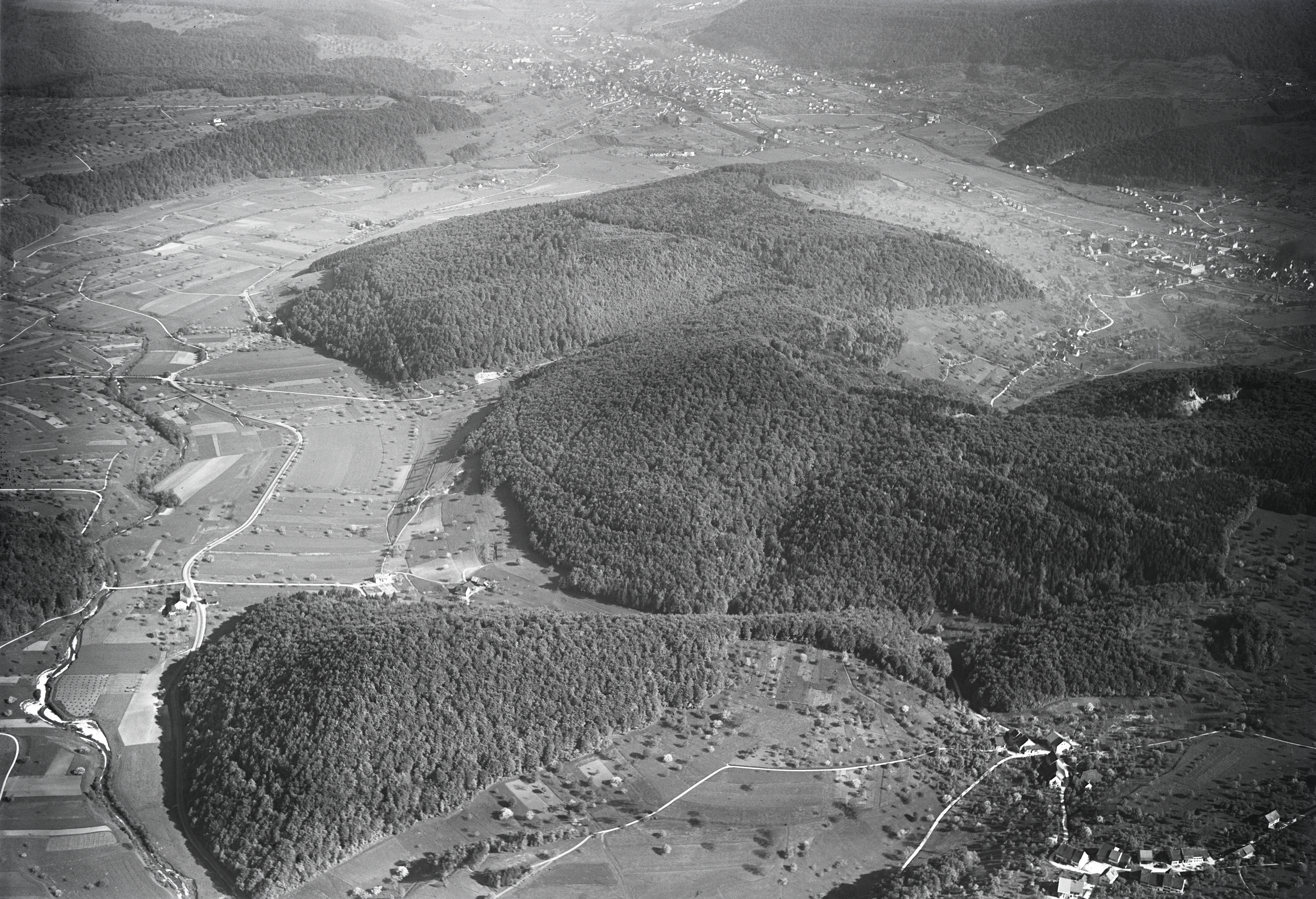
Aerial view from 900 m by Walter Mittelholzer (1930)

Ramlinsburg has an area, as of 2009, of 2.24 square kilometers (0.86 sq mi). Of this area, 0.91 km^{2} (0.35 sq mi) or 40.6% is used for agricultural purposes, while 1.05 km^{2} (0.41 sq mi) or 46.9% is forested. Of the rest of the land, 0.29 km^{2} (0.11 sq mi) or 12.9% is settled (buildings or roads).

Of the built up area, housing and buildings made up 10.7% and transportation infrastructure made up 2.2%. Out of the forested land, 45.1% of the total land area is heavily forested and 1.8% is covered with orchards or small clusters of trees. Of the agricultural land, 8.0% is used for growing crops and 27.7% is pastures, while 4.9% is used for orchards or vine crops.

The municipality is located in the Liestal district, in the north-east portion of the Vorderen Frenke valley.

== Coat of arms ==
The blazon of the municipal coat of arms is Or, bordered Gules, two Crescents edorsed Azure.

== Demographics ==
Ramlinsburg has a population (as of June 2021) of 729. As of 2008, 12.2% of the population are resident foreign nationals. Over the last 10 years (1997–2007) the population has changed at a rate of 36.1%.

Most of the population (as of 2000) speaks German (601 or 93.8%), with French being second most common (9 or 1.4%).

As of 2008, the gender distribution of the population was 49.9% male and 50.1% female. The population was made up of 616 Swiss citizens (87.6% of the population), and 87 non-Swiss residents (12.4%) Of the population in the municipality 100 or about 15.6% were born in Ramlinsburg and lived there in 2000. There were 210 or 32.8% who were born in the same canton, while 227 or 35.4% were born somewhere else in Switzerland, and 92 or 14.4% were born outside of Switzerland.

In 2008 there were 6 live births to Swiss citizens and were 2 deaths of Swiss citizens. Ignoring immigration and emigration, the population of Swiss citizens increased by 4 while the foreign population remained the same. There was 1 Swiss man who immigrated back to Switzerland. At the same time, there were 5 non-Swiss men and 1 non-Swiss woman who emigrated from Switzerland to another country. The total Swiss population change in 2008 (from all sources, including moves across municipal borders) was an increase of 10 and the non-Swiss population decreased by 15 people. This represents a population growth rate of -0.7%.

The age distribution, as of 2010, in Ramlinsburg is; 45 children or 6.4% of the population are between 0 and 6 years old and 123 teenagers or 17.5% are between 7 and 19. Of the adult population, 49 people or 7.0% of the population are between 20 and 29 years old. 77 people or 11.0% are between 30 and 39, 145 people or 20.6% are between 40 and 49, and 153 people or 21.8% are between 50 and 64. The senior population distribution is 90 people or 12.8% of the population are between 65 and 79 years old and there are 21 people or 3.0% who are over 80.

As of 2000, there were 223 people who were single and never married in the municipality. There were 379 married individuals, 16 widows or widowers and 23 individuals who are divorced.

As of 2000, there were 245 private households in the municipality, and an average of 2.6 persons per household. There were 40 households that consist of only one person and 22 households with five or more people. Out of a total of 246 households that answered this question, 16.3% were households made up of just one person. Of the rest of the households, there are 104 married couples without children, 87 married couples with children There were 11 single parents with a child or children. There were 3 households that were made up unrelated people and 1 household that was made some sort of institution or another collective housing.

In 2000 there were 166 single family homes (or 79.8% of the total) out of a total of 208 inhabited buildings. There were 21 multi-family buildings (10.1%), along with 16 multi-purpose buildings that were mostly used for housing (7.7%) and 5 other use buildings (commercial or industrial) that also had some housing (2.4%). Of the single family homes 15 were built before 1919, while 63 were built between 1990 and 2000.

In 2000 there were 262 apartments in the municipality. The most common apartment size was 5 rooms of which there were 88. There were single room apartments and 148 apartments with five or more rooms. Of these apartments, a total of 240 apartments (91.6% of the total) were permanently occupied, while 7 apartments (2.7%) were seasonally occupied and 15 apartments (5.7%) were empty. As of 2007, the construction rate of new housing units was 1.4 new units per 1000 residents. As of 2000 the average price to rent a two-room apartment was about .00 CHF (US$0, £0, €0), a three-room apartment was about .00 CHF (US$0, £0, €0) and a four-room apartment cost an average of .00 CHF (US$0, £0, €0). The vacancy rate for the municipality, in 2008, was 0%.

The historical population is given in the following chart:

== Politics ==
In the 2007 federal election the most popular party was the SVP which received 26.47% of the vote. The next three most popular parties were the SP (24.49%), the Green Party (18.04%) and the FDP (17.53%). In the federal election, a total of 253 votes were cast, and the voter turnout was 53.9%.

== Economy ==
As of 2007, Ramlinsburg had an unemployment rate of 1.59%. As of 2005, there were 19 people employed in the primary economic sector and about 6 businesses involved in this sector. 12 people were employed in the secondary sector and there were 7 businesses in this sector. 42 people were employed in the tertiary sector, with 17 businesses in this sector. There were 358 residents of the municipality who were employed in some capacity, of which females made up 43.3% of the workforce.

In 2008 the total number of full-time equivalent jobs was 74. The number of jobs in the primary sector was 13, all of which were in agriculture. The number of jobs in the secondary sector was 18, of which 2 or (11.1%) were in manufacturing and 16 (88.9%) were in construction. The number of jobs in the tertiary sector was 43. In the tertiary sector; 5 or 11.6% were in wholesale or retail sales or the repair of motor vehicles, 2 or 4.7% were in the movement and storage of goods, 7 or 16.3% were in a hotel or restaurant, 1 or 2.3% were in the information industry, 22 or 51.2% were technical professionals or scientists, 3 or 7.0% were in education.

In 2000, there were 14 workers who commuted into the municipality and 287 workers who commuted away. The municipality is a net exporter of workers, with about 20.5 workers leaving the municipality for every one entering. Of the working population, 15.6% used public transportation to get to work, and 63.4% used a private car.

== Religion ==
From the 2000 census, 109 or 17.0% were Roman Catholic, while 359 or 56.0% belonged to the Swiss Reformed Church. Of the rest of the population, there were 6 members of an Orthodox church (or about 0.94% of the population), there were 2 individuals (or about 0.31% of the population) who belonged to the Christian Catholic Church, and there were 16 individuals (or about 2.50% of the population) who belonged to another Christian church. There were 12 (or about 1.87% of the population) who were Islamic. 127 (or about 19.81% of the population) belonged to no church, are agnostic or atheist, and 9 individuals (or about 1.40% of the population) did not answer the question.

== Education ==
In Ramlinsburg about 256 or (39.9%) of the population have completed non-mandatory upper secondary education, and 154 or (24.0%) have completed additional higher education (either university or a Fachhochschule). Of the 154 who completed tertiary schooling, 64.3% were Swiss men, 22.7% were Swiss women, 9.7% were non-Swiss men and 3.2% were non-Swiss women.

As of 2000, there were 48 students from Ramlinsburg who attended schools outside the municipality.
