= Hölstein =

- Municipality
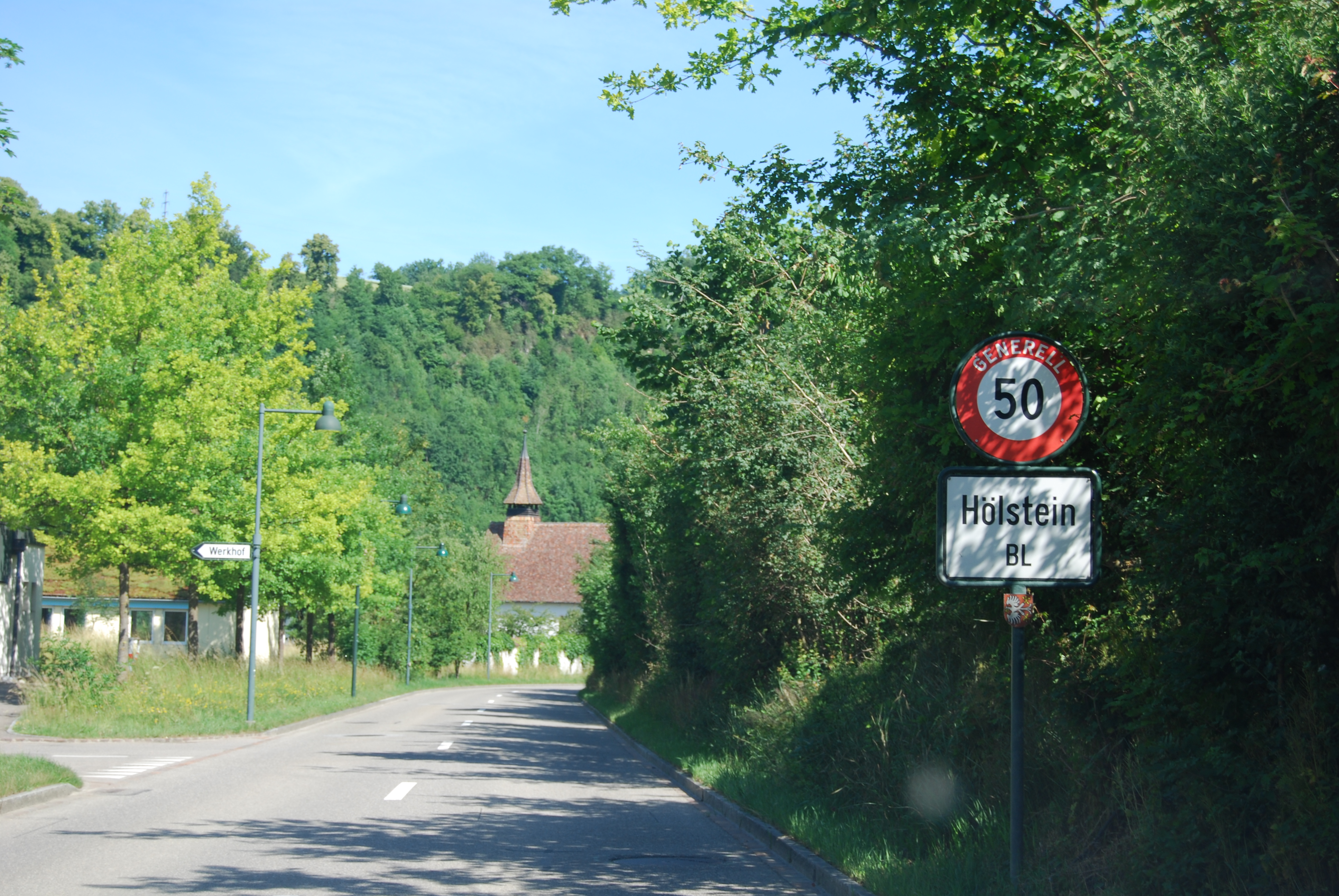

- Coat of arms
- Location of Hölstein
- Location within Switzerland Location within Canton of Basel-Landschaft
- Coordinates: 47°26′N 7°46′E
- Country: Switzerland
- Canton: Basel-Landschaft
- District: Waldenburg

Area
  - Total: 6.03 km^{2} (2.33 sq mi)
- Elevation: 422 m (1,385 ft)

Population (June 2021)
  - Total: 2,573
  - Density: 427/km^{2} (1,110/sq mi)
- Time zone: UTC+01:00 (CET)
  - Summer (DST): UTC+02:00 (CEST)
- Postal code: 4434
- SFOS number: 2886
- ISO 3166 code: CH-BL
- Surrounded by: Bennwil, Bubendorf, Diegten, Lampenberg, Niederdorf, Ramlinsburg, Tenniken, Zunzgen
- Website: www.hoelstein.ch

Hölstein is a municipality in the district of Waldenburg in the canton of Basel-Country in Switzerland.

== History ==
Hölstein is first mentioned around 1101-03 as Hulestein.

== Geography ==
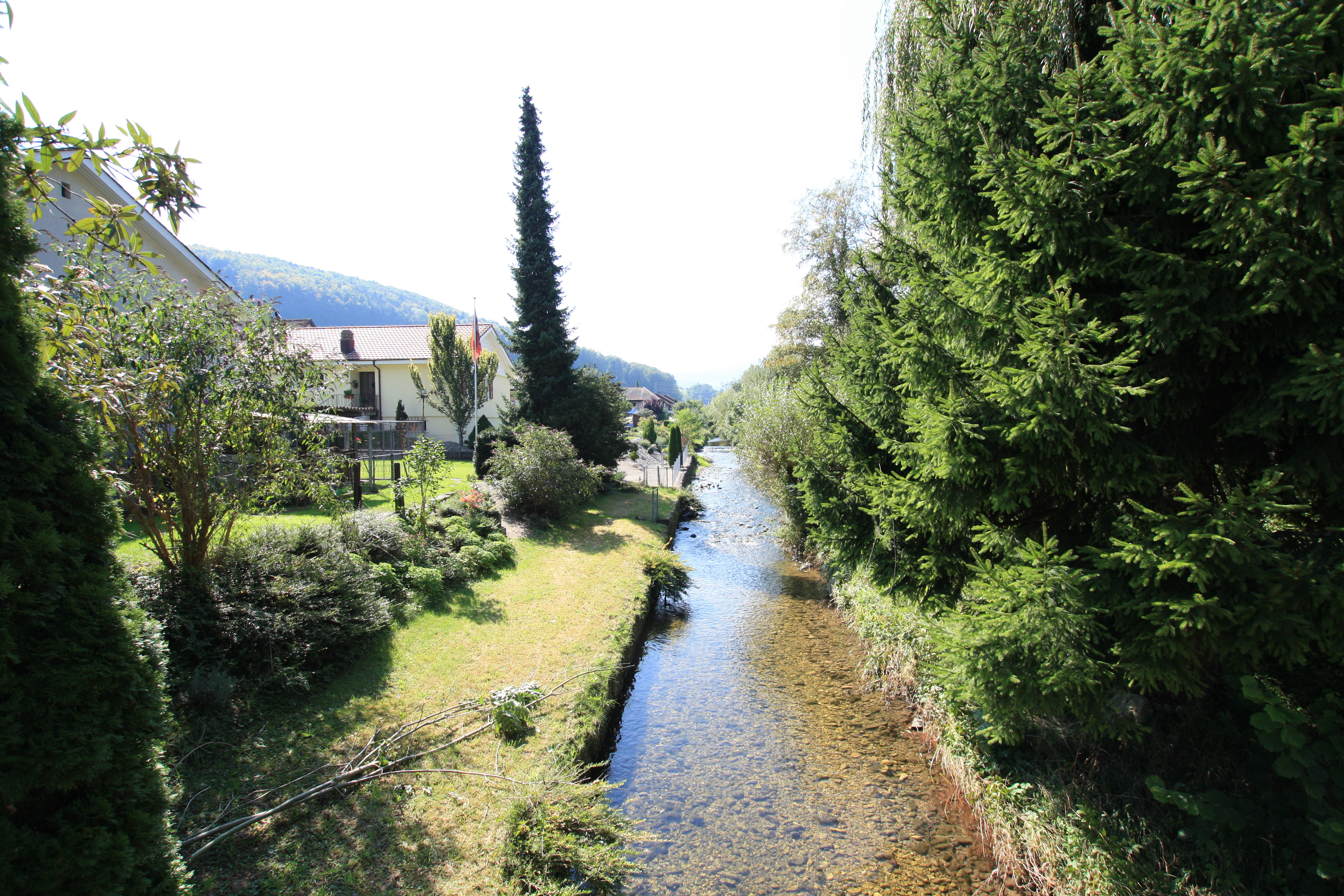
Frenke river in Hölstein

Aerial view (1953)

Hölstein has an area, as of 2009, of 6.03 square kilometers (2.33 sq mi). Of this area, 2.61 km^{2} (1.01 sq mi) or 43.3% is used for agricultural purposes, while 2.4 km^{2} (0.93 sq mi) or 39.8% is forested. Of the rest of the land, 0.89 km^{2} (0.34 sq mi) or 14.8% is settled (buildings or roads), 0.05 km^{2} (12 acres) or 0.8% is either rivers or lakes and 0.01 km^{2} (2.5 acres) or 0.2% is unproductive land.

Of the built up area, industrial buildings made up 1.7% of the total area while housing and buildings made up 7.5% and transportation infrastructure made up 4.6%. Out of the forested land, 38.1% of the total land area is heavily forested and 1.7% is covered with orchards or small clusters of trees. Of the agricultural land, 17.7% is used for growing crops and 22.7% is pastures, while 2.8% is used for orchards or vine crops. All the water in the municipality is flowing water.

The municipality is located in the Waldenburg district. It consists of the village of Hölstein, the settlements of Gründen and Holdenweid and 15 individual farm houses.

== Coat of arms ==
The blazon of the municipal coat of arms is Gules, an Eagle displayed Argent fesswise, langued, beaked and membered Or.

== Demographics ==
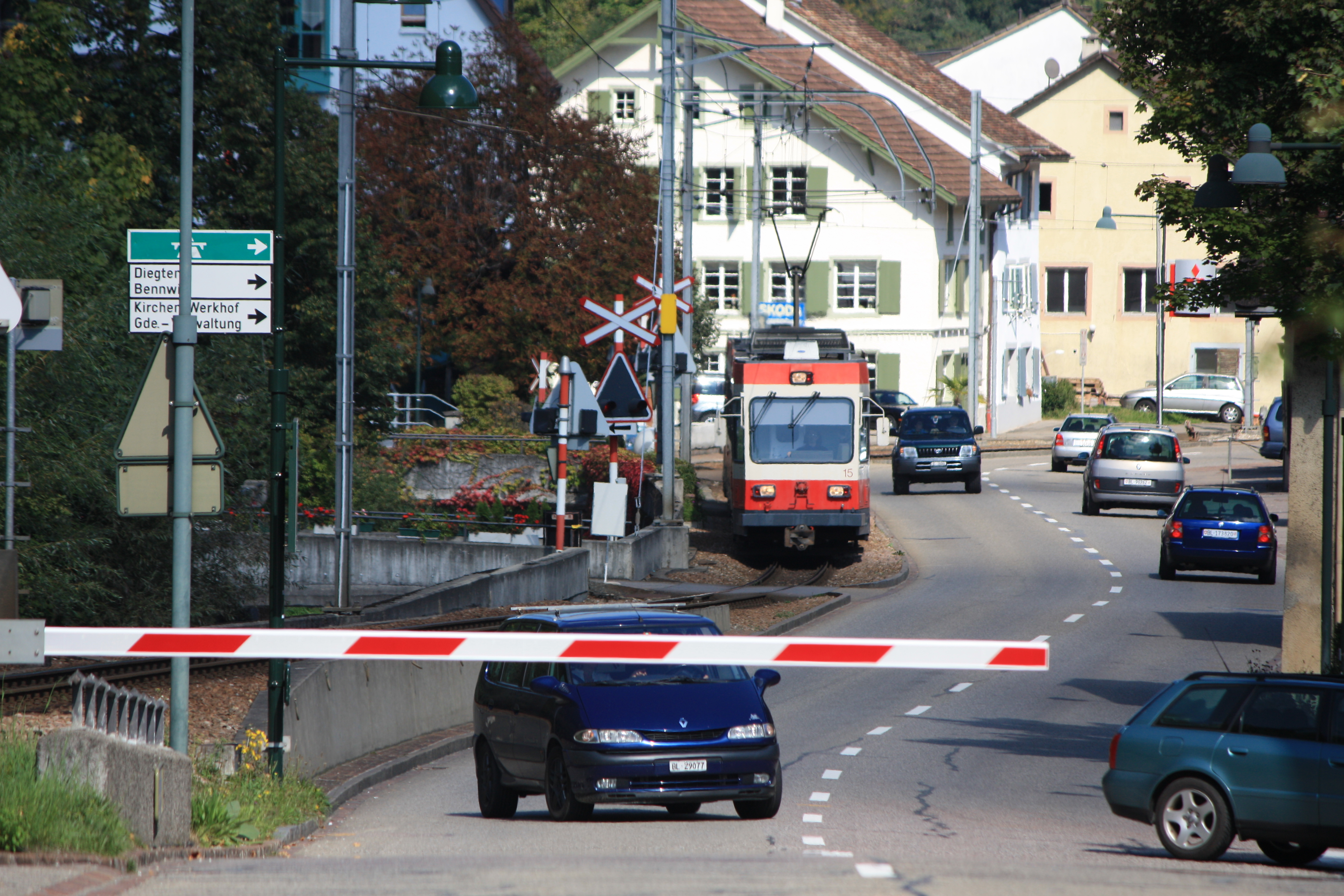
Waldenburgerbahn train in Hölstein

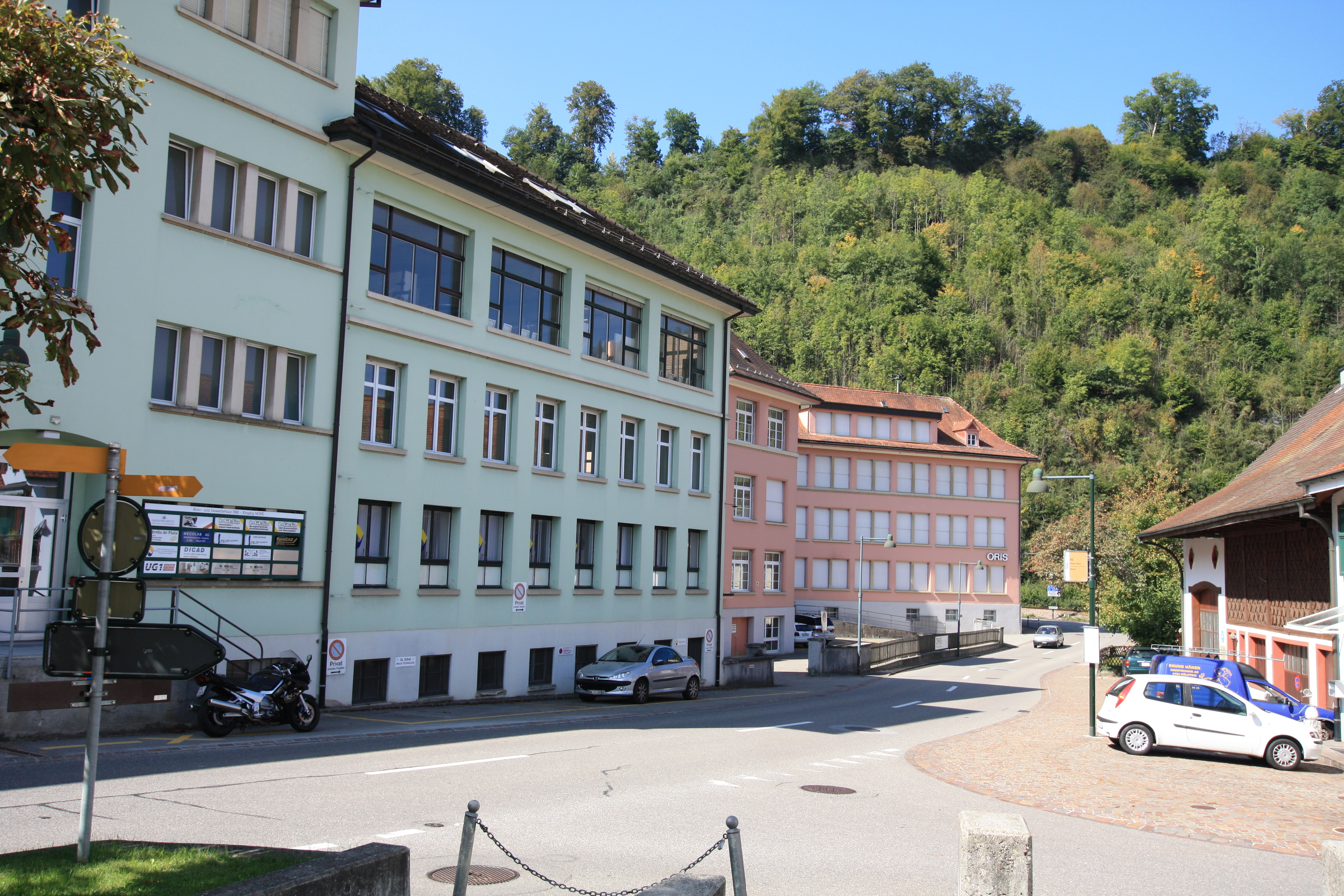
Buildings in Hölstein, including headquarters of the Oris SA company

Hölstein has a population (as of June 2021) of 2,573. As of 2008, 14.1% of the population are resident foreign nationals. Over the last 10 years (1997–2007) the population has changed at a rate of 13.5%.

Most of the population (as of 2000) speaks German (1,889 or 91.2%), with Italian language being second most common (45 or 2.2%) and Albanian being third (42 or 2.0%). There are 14 people who speak French.

As of 2008, the gender distribution of the population was 50.7% male and 49.3% female. The population was made up of 1,976 Swiss citizens (84.2% of the population), and 372 non-Swiss residents (15.8%) Of the population in the municipality 487 or about 23.5% were born in Hölstein and lived there in 2000. There were 598 or 28.9% who were born in the same canton, while 592 or 28.6% were born somewhere else in Switzerland, and 340 or 16.4% were born outside of Switzerland.

In 2008 there were 13 live births to Swiss citizens and 4 births to non-Swiss citizens, and in same time span, there were 19 deaths of Swiss citizens and 1 non-Swiss citizen death. Ignoring immigration and emigration, the population of Swiss citizens decreased by 6 while the foreign population increased by 3. There were 4 Swiss men and 3 Swiss women who emigrated from Switzerland. At the same time, there were 8 non-Swiss men and 10 non-Swiss women who immigrated from another country to Switzerland. The total Swiss population change in 2008 (from all sources, including moves across municipal borders) was a decrease of 16 and the non-Swiss population increased by 5 people. This represents a population growth rate of -0.5%.

The age distribution, as of 2010, in Hölstein is; 160 children or 6.8% of the population are between 0 and 6 years old and 382 teenagers or 16.3% are between 7 and 19. Of the adult population, 290 people or 12.4% of the population are between 20 and 29 years old. 292 people or 12.4% are between 30 and 39, 386 people or 16.4% are between 40 and 49, and 483 people or 20.6% are between 50 and 64. The senior population distribution is 258 people or 11.0% of the population are between 65 and 79 years old and there are 97 people or 4.1% who are over 80.

As of 2000, there were 854 people who were single and never married in the municipality. There were 1,052 married individuals, 64 widows or widowers and 101 individuals who are divorced.

As of 2000, there were 791 private households in the municipality, and an average of 2.6 persons per household. There were 172 households that consist of only one person and 67 households with five or more people. Out of a total of 801 households that answered this question, 21.5% were households made up of just one person and 3 were adults who lived with their parents. Of the rest of the households, there are 262 married couples without children, 295 married couples with children There were 50 single parents with a child or children. There were 9 households that were made up unrelated people and 10 households that were made some sort of institution or another collective housing.

In 2000 there were 407 single family homes (or 73.3% of the total) out of a total of 555 inhabited buildings. There were 84 multi-family buildings (15.1%), along with 46 multi-purpose buildings that were mostly used for housing (8.3%) and 18 other use buildings (commercial or industrial) that also had some housing (3.2%). Of the single family homes, 25 were built before 1919, while 71 were built between 1990 and 2000. The greatest number of single family homes (117) were built between 1971 and 1980.

In 2000 there were 830 apartments in the municipality. The most common apartment size was 4 rooms of which there were 245. There were 12 single room apartments and 373 apartments with five or more rooms. Of these apartments, a total of 766 apartments (92.3% of the total) were permanently occupied, while 43 apartments (5.2%) were seasonally occupied and 21 apartments (2.5%) were empty. As of 2009, the construction rate of new housing units was 2.6 new units per 1000 residents. As of 2000 the average price to rent a two-room apartment was about 708.00 CHF (US$570, £320, €450), a three-room apartment was about 852.00 CHF (US$680, £380, €550) and a four-room apartment cost an average of 1214.00 CHF (US$970, £550, €780). The vacancy rate for the municipality, in 2010, was 0.73%.

The historical population is given in the following chart:

== Politics ==
In the 2007 federal election the most popular party was the SVP which received 32.53% of the vote. The next three most popular parties were the SP (24.08%), the FDP (14.31%) and the Green Party (12.97%). In the federal election, a total of 773 votes were cast, and the voter turnout was 47.2%.

== Economy ==
As of 2010, Hölstein had an unemployment rate of 3.7%. As of 2008, there were 35 people employed in the primary economic sector and about 11 businesses involved in this sector. 439 people were employed in the secondary sector and there were 33 businesses in this sector. 287 people were employed in the tertiary sector, with 66 businesses in this sector. There were 1,080 residents of the municipality who were employed in some capacity, of which females made up 45.2% of the workforce.

In 2008 the total number of full-time equivalent jobs was 668. The number of jobs in the primary sector was 25, all of which were in agriculture. The number of jobs in the secondary sector was 411 of which 297 or (72.3%) were in manufacturing and 112 (27.3%) were in construction. The number of jobs in the tertiary sector was 232. In the tertiary sector; 72 or 31.0% were in wholesale or retail sales or the repair of motor vehicles, 20 or 8.6% were in the movement and storage of goods, 23 or 9.9% were in a hotel or restaurant, 13 or 5.6% were in the information industry, 2 or 0.9% were the insurance or financial industry, 18 or 7.8% were technical professionals or scientists, 26 or 11.2% were in education and 11 or 4.7% were in health care.

In 2000, there were 479 workers who commuted into the municipality and 810 workers who commuted away. The municipality is a net exporter of workers, with about 1.7 workers leaving the municipality for every one entering. About 3.1% of the workforce coming into Hölstein are coming from outside Switzerland. Of the working population, 27.9% used public transportation to get to work, and 51.7% used a private car.

== Religion ==
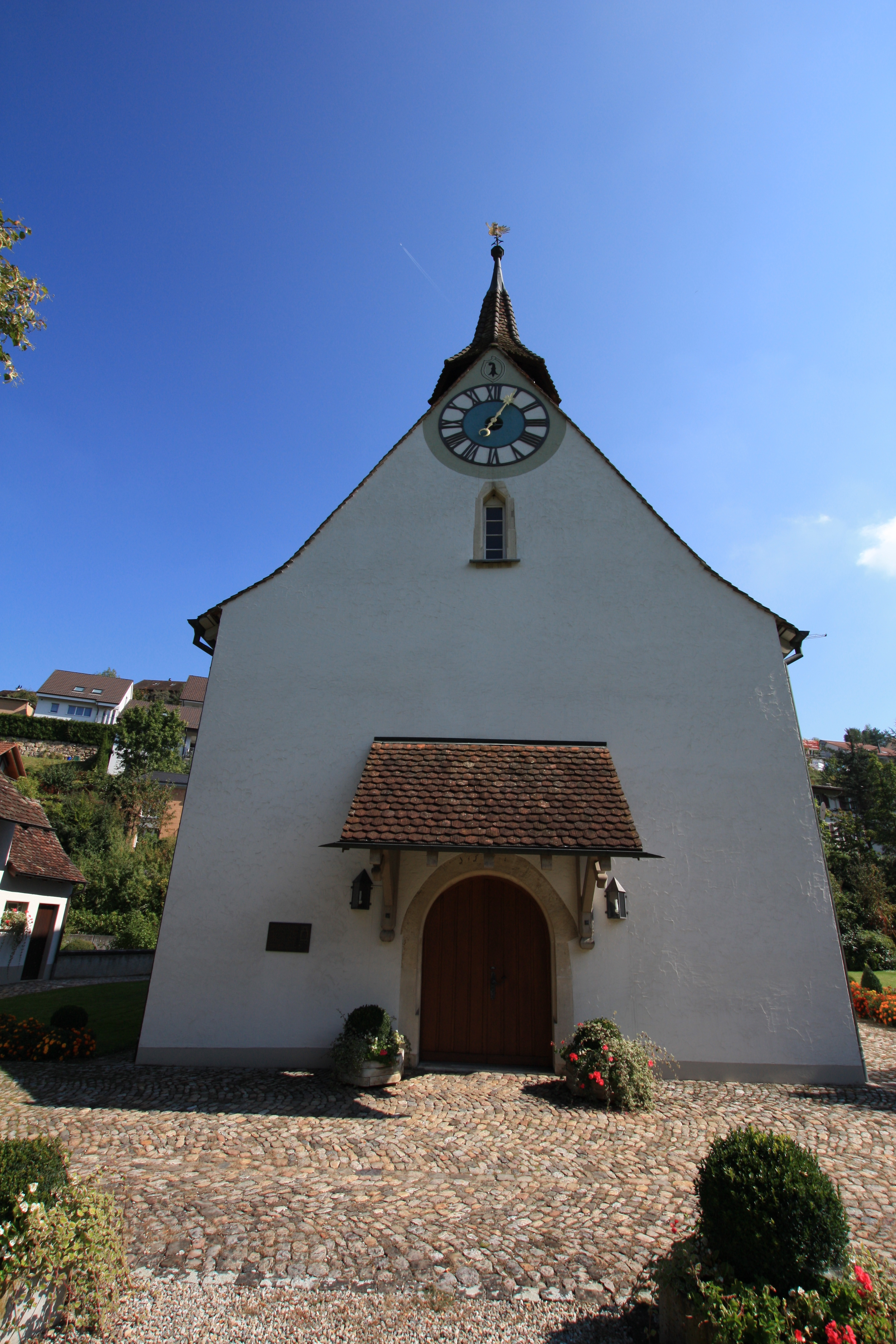
Reformed church of Hölstein

From the 2000 census, 409 or 19.7% were Roman Catholic, while 1,140 or 55.0% belonged to the Swiss Reformed Church. Of the rest of the population, there were 20 members of an Orthodox church (or about 0.97% of the population), there were 7 individuals (or about 0.34% of the population) who belonged to the Christian Catholic Church, and there were 114 individuals (or about 5.50% of the population) who belonged to another Christian church. There were 95 (or about 4.59% of the population) who were Islamic. There were 8 individuals who were Hindu and 2 individuals who belonged to another church. 204 (or about 9.85% of the population) belonged to no church, are agnostic or atheist, and 72 individuals (or about 3.48% of the population) did not answer the question.

== Education ==
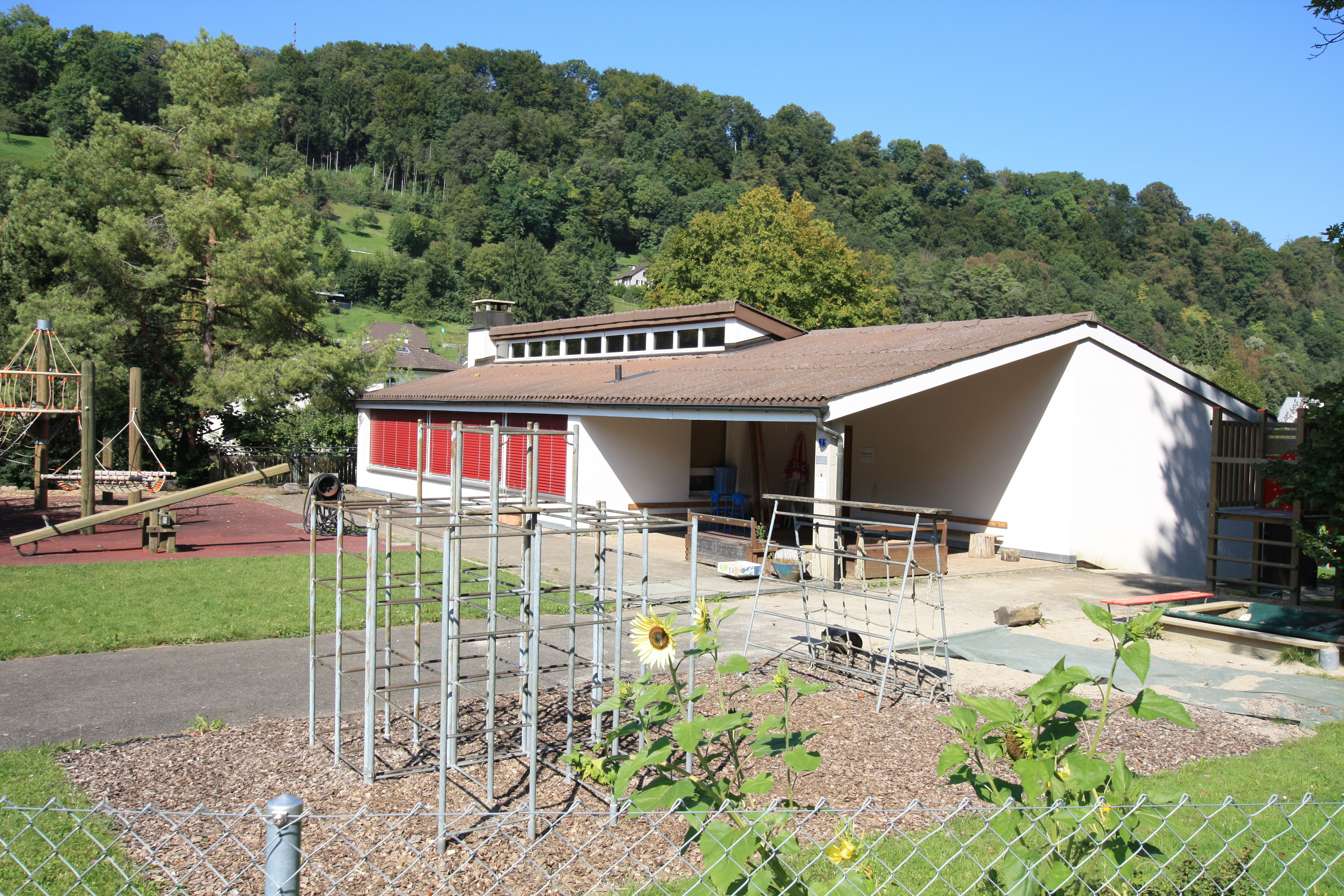
Hölstein Kindergarten

In Hölstein about 835 or (40.3%) of the population have completed non-mandatory upper secondary education, and 257 or (12.4%) have completed additional higher education (either university or a Fachhochschule). Of the 257 who completed tertiary schooling, 66.1% were Swiss men, 20.6% were Swiss women, 9.3% were non-Swiss men and 3.9% were non-Swiss women.

As of 2000, there were 21 students in Hölstein who came from another municipality, while 182 residents attended schools outside the municipality.

== Transport ==
Hölstein is served by the Waldenburg narrow gauge railway, which operates a quarter-hourly train service to Liestal. At Liestal railway station, onward connection is made with the Swiss Federal Railway's services to Basel, Bern, Lucerne and Zürich.

== Notable residents / Firms ==
It is the birthplace of Liverpool F.C. full-back Philipp Degen.

The Swiss watch company Oris (oris.ch) has been headquartered in Hölstein since it started in 1904.
