= Liestal District =

Coordinates: 47°29′N 7°44′E

Liestal District Bezirk Liestal
- District
- Country: Switzerland
- Canton: Basel-Landschaft
- Capital: Liestal

Area
  - Total: 85.83 km^{2} (33.14 sq mi)

Population (2021)
  - Total: 62,086
  - Density: 723.4/km^{2} (1,873/sq mi)
- Time zone: UTC+1 (CET)
  - Summer (DST): UTC+2 (CEST)
- Municipalities: 14

Liestal District is one of the five districts of the largely German-speaking canton of Basel-Country, Switzerland. The city of Liestal serves as capital of both the district of Liestal and the canton of Basel-Country. It has a population of 62,086 (as of 30 June 2021).

== Geography ==
Liestal district has an area, as of 2009, of 85.83 square kilometers (33.14 sq mi). Of this area, 29.07 km^{2} (11.22 sq mi) or 33.9% is used for agricultural purposes, while 37.08 km^{2} (14.32 sq mi) or 43.2% is forested. Of the rest of the land, 18.89 km^{2} (7.29 sq mi) or 22.0% is settled (buildings or roads), 0.68 km^{2} (0.26 sq mi) or 0.8% is either rivers or lakes and 0.13 km^{2} (32 acres) or 0.2% is unproductive land.

Of the built up area, industrial buildings made up 3.2% of the total area while housing and buildings made up 10.6% and transportation infrastructure made up 5.7%. Power and water infrastructure as well as other special developed areas made up 1.2% of the area while parks, green belts and sports fields made up 1.3%. Out of the forested land, 41.4% of the total land area is heavily forested and 1.8% is covered with orchards or small clusters of trees. Of the agricultural land, 13.9% is used for growing crops and 16.6% is pastures, while 3.4% is used for orchards or vine crops. All the water in the municipality is flowing water.

== Municipalities ==
Liestal contains a total of fourteen municipalities:

Municipality	Population (30 June 2021)	Area, km^{2}
Arisdorf	1,714	9.99
Augst	1,057	1.64
Bubendorf	4,369	10.81
Frenkendorf	6,511	4.58
Füllinsdorf	4,653	4.62
Giebenach	1,113	1.32
Hersberg	356	1.67
Lausen	5,588	5.56
Liestal	14,963	18.21
Lupsingen	1,468	3.12
Pratteln	16,621	10.70
Ramlinsburg	729	2.24
Seltisberg	1,313	3.57
Ziefen	1,631	7.80
Total	62,086	85.83

== Demographics ==
Liestal district has a population (as of June 2021) of 62,086. As of 2008, 24.6% of the population are resident foreign nationals.

Most of the population (as of 2000) speaks German (45,694 or 84.0%), with Italian language being second most common (2,607 or 4.8%) and Turkish being third (1,102 or 2.0%). There are 573 people who speak French and 42 people who speak Romansh.

As of 2008, the gender distribution of the population was 49.5% male and 50.5% female. The population was made up of 42,590 Swiss citizens (74.5% of the population), and 14,587 non-Swiss residents (25.5%) Of the population in the district 13,360 or about 24.5% were born in the Liestal district and lived there in 2000. There were 11,599 or 21.3% who were born in the same canton, while 14,741 or 27.1% were born somewhere else in Switzerland, and 12,944 or 23.8% were born outside of Switzerland.

In 2008 there were 363 live births to Swiss citizens and 159 births to non-Swiss citizens, and in same time span there were 355 deaths of Swiss citizens and 30 non-Swiss citizen deaths. Ignoring immigration and emigration, the population of Swiss citizens increased by 8 while the foreign population increased by 129. There were 37 Swiss men and 3 Swiss women who emigrated from Switzerland. At the same time, there were 195 non-Swiss men and 201 non-Swiss women who immigrated from another country to Switzerland. The total Swiss population change in 2008 (from all sources, including moves across municipal borders) was an increase of 173 and the non-Swiss population change was an increase of 134 people. This represents a population growth rate of 0.5%.

The age distribution, as of 2010, in the district is; 3,705 children or 6.5% of the population are between 0 and 6 years old and 8,013 teenagers or 14.0% are between 7 and 19. Of the adult population, 7,368 people or 12.9% of the population are between 20 and 29 years old. 7,351 people or 12.9% are between 30 and 39, 9,285 people or 16.2% are between 40 and 49, and 11,839 people or 20.7% are between 50 and 64. The senior population distribution is 7,154 people or 12.5% of the population are between 65 and 79 years old and there are 2,462 people or 4.3% who are over 80.

As of 2000, there were 21,689 people who were single and never married in the municipality. There were 27,154 married individuals, 2,703 widows or widowers and 2,875 individuals who are divorced.

There were 7,163 households that consist of only one person and 1,424 households with five or more people. Out of a total of 23,129 households that answered this question, 31.0% were households made up of just one person and 133 were adults who lived with their parents. Of the rest of the households, there are 6,953 married couples without children, 6,984 married couples with children There were 1,182 single parents with a child or children. There were 298 households that were made up unrelated people and 416 households that were made some sort of institution or another collective housing.

As of 2000 the average price to rent a two-room apartment was about 813.00 CHF (US$650, £370, €520), a three-room apartment was about 986.00 CHF (US$790, £440, €630) and a four-room apartment cost an average of 1219.00 CHF (US$980, £550, €780).

The historical population is given in the following chart:

== Politics ==
In the 2007 federal election the most popular party was the SVP which received 29.61% of the vote. The next three most popular parties were the SP (25.8%), the FDP (17.7%) and the Green Party (14.53%). In the federal election, a total of 17,127 votes were cast, and the voter turnout was 48.7%.

== Religion ==
From the 2000 census, 14,265 or 26.2% were Roman Catholic, while 24,348 or 44.7% belonged to the Swiss Reformed Church. Of the rest of the population, there were 1,260 members of an Orthodox church (or about 2.32% of the population), there were 155 individuals (or about 0.28% of the population) who belonged to the Christian Catholic Church, and there were 1,449 individuals (or about 2.66% of the population) who belonged to another Christian church. There were 25 individuals (or about 0.05% of the population) who were Jewish, and 3,740 (or about 6.87% of the population) who were Islamic. There were 130 individuals who were Buddhist, 269 individuals who were Hindu and 65 individuals who belonged to another church. 6,832 (or about 12.55% of the population) belonged to no church, are agnostic or atheist, and 1,883 individuals (or about 3.46% of the population) did not answer the question.

== Education ==
In the district about 20,624 or (37.9%) of the population have completed non-mandatory upper secondary education, and 6,977 or (12.8%) have completed additional higher education (either University or a Fachhochschule). Of the 6,977 who completed tertiary schooling, 62.3% were Swiss men, 22.6% were Swiss women, 9.5% were non-Swiss men and 5.6% were non-Swiss women.
