= Büren, Solothurn =

Büren
- Municipality
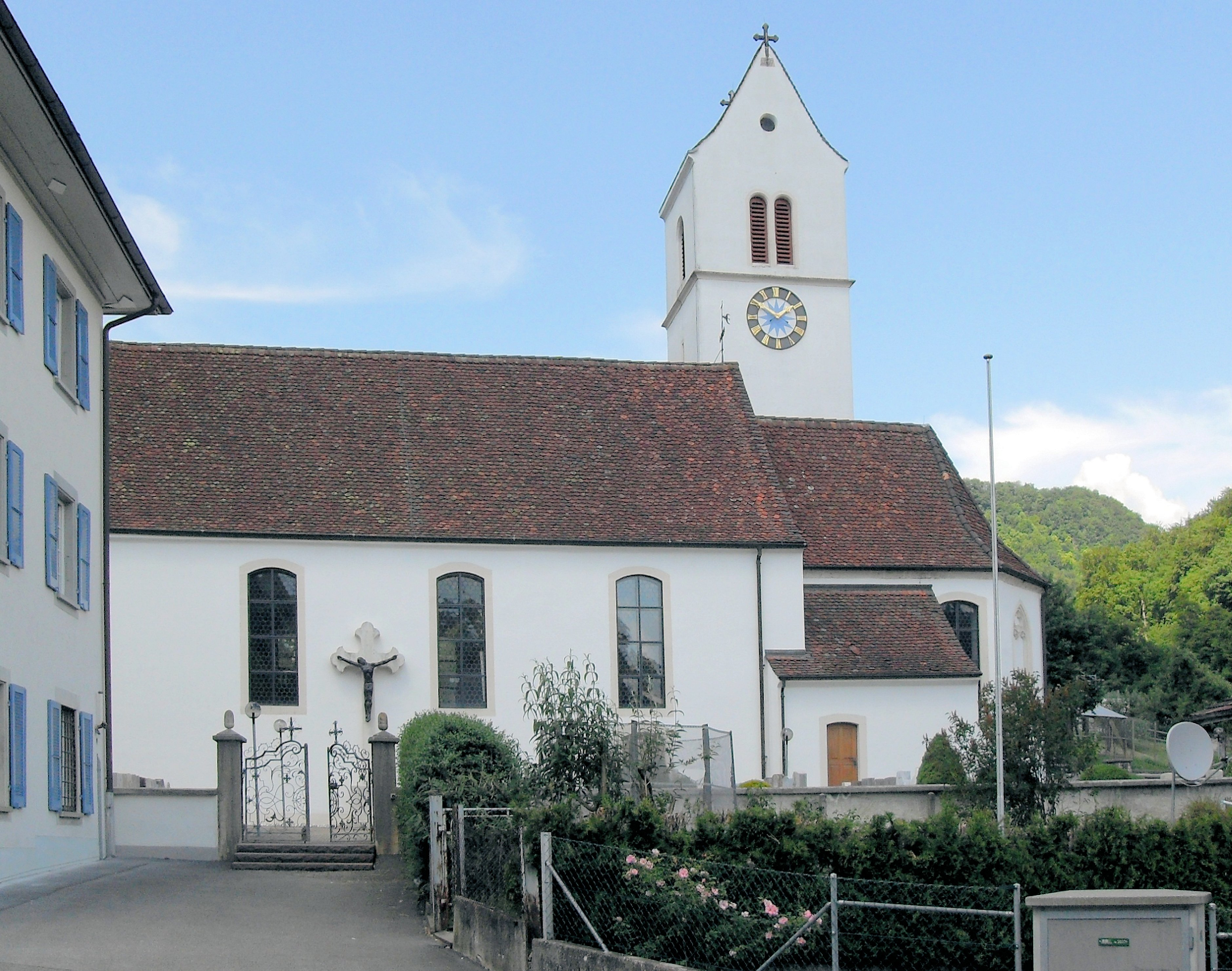

- Coat of arms
- Location of Büren
- Location within Switzerland Location within Canton of Solothurn
- Coordinates: 47°27′N 7°40′E
- Country: Switzerland
- Canton: Solothurn
- District: Dorneck

Area
  - Total: 6.23 km^{2} (2.41 sq mi)
- Elevation: 441 m (1,447 ft)
- Highest elevation (Bürenflue): 727 m (2,385 ft)

Population (December 2020)
  - Total: 1,046
  - Density: 168/km^{2} (435/sq mi)
- Time zone: UTC+01:00 (CET)
  - Summer (DST): UTC+02:00 (CEST)
- Postal code: 4413
- SFOS number: 2472
- ISO 3166 code: CH-SO
- Surrounded by: Gempen, Hochwald, Lupsingen (BL), Nuglar-Sankt Pantaleon, Seewen, Ziefen (BL)
- Website: www.bueren-so.ch

Büren (Swiss Standard German pronunciation: [ˈbyːrən]; Swiss German: Büüre) is a municipality in the district of Dorneck in the canton of Solothurn in Switzerland.

== History ==
Büren is first mentioned in 1194 as Buoron. In 1317 it was mentioned as Bürron.

== Geography ==
Aerial view (1948)

Büren has an area, as of 2009, of 6.23 square kilometers (2.41 sq mi). Of this area, 2.92 km^{2} (1.13 sq mi) or 46.9% is used for agricultural purposes, while 2.84 km^{2} (1.10 sq mi) or 45.6% is forested. Of the rest of the land, 0.44 km^{2} (0.17 sq mi) or 7.1% is settled (buildings or roads), 0.02 km^{2} (4.9 acres) or 0.3% is either rivers or lakes.

Of the built up area, housing and buildings made up 4.7% and transportation infrastructure made up 1.9%. Out of the forested land, 43.3% of the total land area is heavily forested and 2.2% is covered with orchards or small clusters of trees. Of the agricultural land, 14.9% is used for growing crops and 22.8% is pastures, while 9.1% is used for orchards or vine crops. All the water in the municipality is flowing water.

The municipality is located in the Dorneck district, at the foot of Schlingenberg mountain.

== Coat of arms ==
The blazon of the municipal coat of arms is Azure a Pear Tree issuant from a Mount of 3 Coupeaux Vert surrounded with three Mullets Or, one and two.

== Demographics ==
Büren has a population (as of December 2020) of 1,046. As of 2008, 9.4% of the population are resident foreign nationals. Over the last 10 years (1999–2009 ) the population has changed at a rate of 7.3%.

Most of the population (as of 2000) speaks German (836 or 96.1%), with Italian being second most common (12 or 1.4%) and Serbo-Croatian being third (8 or 0.9%). There are 3 people who speak French and 1 person who speaks Romansh.

As of 2008, the gender distribution of the population was 49.8% male and 50.2% female. The population was made up of 417 Swiss men (44.2% of the population) and 53 (5.6%) non-Swiss men. There were 426 Swiss women (45.2%) and 47 (5.0%) non-Swiss women. Of the population in the municipality 326 or about 37.5% were born in Büren and lived there in 2000. There were 67 or 7.7% who were born in the same canton, while 382 or 43.9% were born somewhere else in Switzerland, and 74 or 8.5% were born outside of Switzerland.

In 2008 there were 11 live births to Swiss citizens and were 7 deaths of Swiss citizens. Ignoring immigration and emigration, the population of Swiss citizens increased by 4 while the foreign population remained the same. There were 2 Swiss men and 1 Swiss woman who emigrated from Switzerland. At the same time, there were 3 non-Swiss men and 2 non-Swiss women who immigrated from another country to Switzerland. The total Swiss population change in 2008 (from all sources, including moves across municipal borders) was a decrease of 14 and the non-Swiss population decreased by 1 people. This represents a population growth rate of -1.6%.

The age distribution, as of 2000, in Büren is; 74 children or 8.5% of the population are between 0 and 6 years old and 174 teenagers or 20.0% are between 7 and 19. Of the adult population, 46 people or 5.3% of the population are between 20 and 24 years old. 265 people or 30.5% are between 25 and 44, and 202 people or 23.2% are between 45 and 64. The senior population distribution is 95 people or 10.9% of the population are between 65 and 79 years old and there are 14 people or 1.6% who are over 80.

As of 2000, there were 386 people who were single and never married in the municipality. There were 420 married individuals, 31 widows or widowers and 33 individuals who are divorced.

As of 2000, there were 328 private households in the municipality, and an average of 2.6 persons per household. There were 70 households that consist of only one person and 26 households with five or more people. Out of a total of 331 households that answered this question, 21.1% were households made up of just one person and there were 3 adults who lived with their parents. Of the rest of the households, there are 101 married couples without children, 130 married couples with children There were 17 single parents with a child or children. There were 7 households that were made up of unrelated people and 3 households that were made up of some sort of institution or another collective housing.

In 2000 there were 205 single family homes (or 75.4% of the total) out of a total of 272 inhabited buildings. There were 25 multi-family buildings (9.2%), along with 33 multi-purpose buildings that were mostly used for housing (12.1%) and 9 other use buildings (commercial or industrial) that also had some housing (3.3%). Of the single family homes 41 were built before 1919, while 55 were built between 1990 and 2000. The greatest number of single family homes (44) were built between 1981 and 1990.

In 2000 there were 388 apartments in the municipality. The most common apartment size was 4 rooms of which there were 123. There were 12 single room apartments and 173 apartments with five or more rooms. Of these apartments, a total of 320 apartments (82.5% of the total) were permanently occupied, while 51 apartments (13.1%) were seasonally occupied and 17 apartments (4.4%) were empty. As of 2009, the construction rate of new housing units was 3.2 new units per 1000 residents. The vacancy rate for the municipality, in 2010, was 2.11%.

The historical population is given in the following chart:

== Politics ==
In the 2007 federal election the most popular party was the SVP which received 30.09% of the vote. The next three most popular parties were the CVP (23.29%), the FDP (16.24%) and the SP (15.32%). In the federal election, a total of 350 votes were cast, and the voter turnout was 51.6%.

== Economy ==
As of 2010, Büren had an unemployment rate of 2.2%. As of 2008, there were 36 people employed in the primary economic sector and about 13 businesses involved in this sector. 8 people were employed in the secondary sector and there were 4 businesses in this sector. 123 people were employed in the tertiary sector, with 22 businesses in this sector. There were 447 residents of the municipality who were employed in some capacity, of which females made up 41.2% of the workforce.

In 2008 the total number of full-time equivalent jobs was 117. The number of jobs in the primary sector was 24, of which 23 were in agriculture and 1 was in forestry or lumber production. The number of jobs in the secondary sector was 6, all of which were in construction. The number of jobs in the tertiary sector was 87. In the tertiary sector; 13 or 14.9% were in wholesale or retail sales or the repair of motor vehicles, 24 or 27.6% were in the movement and storage of goods, 2 or 2.3% were in a hotel or restaurant, 3 or 3.4% were in the information industry, 3 or 3.4% were technical professionals or scientists, 32 or 36.8% were in education and 2 or 2.3% were in health care.

In 2000, there were 58 workers who commuted into the municipality and 347 workers who commuted away. The municipality is a net exporter of workers, with about 6.0 workers leaving the municipality for every one entering. Of the working population, 25.3% used public transportation to get to work, and 55.5% used a private car.

== Religion ==
From the 2000 census, 471 or 54.1% were Roman Catholic, while 254 or 29.2% belonged to the Swiss Reformed Church. Of the rest of the population, there was 1 member of an Orthodox church who belonged, there were 10 individuals (or about 1.15% of the population) who belonged to the Christian Catholic Church, and there were 18 individuals (or about 2.07% of the population) who belonged to another Christian church. There were 8 (or about 0.92% of the population) who were Islamic. There was one person who was Hindu. 95 (or about 10.92% of the population) belonged to no church, are agnostic or atheist, and 12 individuals (or about 1.38% of the population) did not answer the question.

== Education ==
In Büren about 350 or (40.2%) of the population have completed non-mandatory upper secondary education, and 101 or (11.6%) have completed additional higher education (either university or a Fachhochschule). Of the 101 who completed tertiary schooling, 74.3% were Swiss men, 22.8% were Swiss women.

As of 2000, there were 147 students in Büren who came from another municipality, while 28 residents attended schools outside the municipality.
