= Lupsingen =

- Municipality
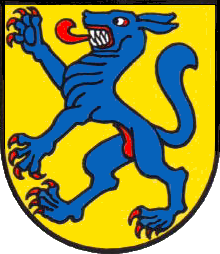
- Coat of arms
- Location of Lupsingen
- Location within Switzerland Location within Canton of Basel-Landschaft
- Coordinates: 47°27′N 7°42′E
- Country: Switzerland
- Canton: Basel-Landschaft
- District: Liestal

Area
  - Total: 3.12 km^{2} (1.20 sq mi)
- Elevation: 431 m (1,414 ft)

Population (June 2021)
  - Total: 1,468
  - Density: 471/km^{2} (1,220/sq mi)
- Time zone: UTC+01:00 (CET)
  - Summer (DST): UTC+02:00 (CEST)
- Postal code: 4419
- SFOS number: 2830
- ISO 3166 code: CH-BL
- Surrounded by: Bubendorf, Büren (SO), Nuglar-Sankt Pantaleon (SO), Seewen (SO), Seltisberg, Ziefen
- Website: lupsingen.ch

Lupsingen is a municipality in the district of Liestal in the canton of Basel-Country in Switzerland.

== History ==
Lupsingen is first mentioned in 1194 as Lubesingin.

== Geography ==
Aerial view (1953)

Lupsingen has an area, as of 2009, of 3.12 square kilometers (1.20 sq mi). Of this area, 1.27 km^{2} (0.49 sq mi) or 40.7% is used for agricultural purposes, while 1.39 km^{2} (0.54 sq mi) or 44.6% is forested. Of the rest of the land, 0.49 km^{2} (0.19 sq mi) or 15.7% is settled (buildings or roads).

Of the built up area, housing and buildings made up 12.2% and transportation infrastructure made up 2.6%. Out of the forested land, 43.3% of the total land area is heavily forested and 1.3% is covered with orchards or small clusters of trees. Of the agricultural land, 19.9% is used for growing crops and 18.9% is pastures, while 1.9% is used for orchards or vine crops.

The municipality is located in the Liestal district, in a shallow depression in the Oris valley.

== Coat of arms ==
The blazon of the municipal coat of arms is Or, a Wolf rampant Azure, armed, langued, vilené and of mouths Gules, toothed Argent.

== Demographics ==
Lupsingen has a population (as of June 2021) of 1,468. As of 2008, 7.5% of the population are resident foreign nationals. Over the last 10 years (1997–2007) the population has changed at a rate of 15.6%.

Most of the population (as of 2000) speaks German (1,173 or 94.8%), with Albanian being second most common (17 or 1.4%) and French being third (11 or 0.9%).

As of 2008, the gender distribution of the population was 49.3% male and 50.7% female. The population was made up of 1,233 Swiss citizens (91.1% of the population), and 120 non-Swiss residents (8.9%) Of the population in the municipality 278 or about 22.5% were born in Lupsingen and lived there in 2000. There were 348 or 28.1% who were born in the same canton, while 435 or 35.2% were born somewhere else in Switzerland, and 140 or 11.3% were born outside of Switzerland.

In 2008 there were 6 live births to Swiss citizens and were 2 deaths of Swiss citizens. Ignoring immigration and emigration, the population of Swiss citizens increased by 4 while the foreign population remained the same. There was 1 Swiss man who emigrated from Switzerland. At the same time, there was 1 non-Swiss man and 4 non-Swiss women who immigrated from another country to Switzerland. The total Swiss population change in 2008 (from all sources, including moves across municipal borders) was an increase of 18 and the non-Swiss population increased by 12 people. This represents a population growth rate of 2.3%.

The age distribution, as of 2010, in Lupsingen is; 94 children or 6.9% of the population are between 0 and 6 years old and 213 teenagers or 15.7% are between 7 and 19. Of the adult population, 113 people or 8.4% of the population are between 20 and 29 years old. 142 people or 10.5% are between 30 and 39, 240 people or 17.7% are between 40 and 49, and 292 people or 21.6% are between 50 and 64. The senior population distribution is 211 people or 15.6% of the population are between 65 and 79 years old and there are 48 people or 3.5% who are over 80.

As of 2000, there were 462 people who were single and never married in the municipality. There were 664 married individuals, 51 widows or widowers and 60 individuals who are divorced.

As of 2000, there were 483 private households in the municipality, and an average of 2.6 persons per household. There were 107 households that consist of only one person and 37 households with five or more people. Out of a total of 487 households that answered this question, 22.0% were households made up of just one person and 1 were adults who lived with their parents. Of the rest of the households, there are 178 married couples without children, 168 married couples with children There were 28 single parents with a child or children. There was 1 household that was made up unrelated people and 4 households that were made some sort of institution or another collective housing.

In 2000 there were 337 single family homes (or 82.2% of the total) out of a total of 410 inhabited buildings. There were 35 multi-family buildings (8.5%), along with 32 multi-purpose buildings that were mostly used for housing (7.8%) and 6 other use buildings (commercial or industrial) that also had some housing (1.5%). Of the single family homes 23 were built before 1919, while 81 were built between 1990 and 2000. The greatest number of single family homes (108) were built between 1971 and 1980.

In 2000 there were 490 apartments in the municipality. The most common apartment size was 5 rooms of which there were 157. There were 7 single room apartments and 286 apartments with five or more rooms. Of these apartments, a total of 472 apartments (96.3% of the total) were permanently occupied, while 9 apartments (1.8%) were seasonally occupied and 9 apartments (1.8%) were empty. As of 2007, the construction rate of new housing units was 12.4 new units per 1000 residents. As of 2000 the average price to rent a two-room apartment was about 1005.00 CHF (US$800, £450, €640), a three-room apartment was about 1240.00 CHF (US$990, £560, €790) and a four-room apartment cost an average of 1387.00 CHF (US$1110, £620, €890). The vacancy rate for the municipality, in 2008, was 0.18%.

The historical population is given in the following chart:

== Politics ==
In the 2007 federal election the most popular party was the SVP which received 30.8% of the vote. The next three most popular parties were the SP (23.94%), the FDP (19.16%) and the Green Party (15.45%). In the federal election, a total of 549 votes were cast, and the voter turnout was 57.2%.

== Economy ==
As of 2007, Lupsingen had an unemployment rate of 1.6%. As of 2005, there were 13 people employed in the primary economic sector and about 6 businesses involved in this sector. 17 people were employed in the secondary sector and there were 7 businesses in this sector. 72 people were employed in the tertiary sector, with 26 businesses in this sector. There were 657 residents of the municipality who were employed in some capacity, of which females made up 43.8% of the workforce.

In 2008 the total number of full-time equivalent jobs was 75. The number of jobs in the primary sector was 7, all of which were in agriculture. The number of jobs in the secondary sector was 13, of which 3 or (23.1%) were in manufacturing and 10 (76.9%) were in construction. The number of jobs in the tertiary sector was 55. In the tertiary sector; 6 or 10.9% were in wholesale or retail sales or the repair of motor vehicles, 10 or 18.2% were in the movement and storage of goods, 3 or 5.5% were in a hotel or restaurant, 10 or 18.2% were technical professionals or scientists, 10 or 18.2% were in education and 1 or 1.8% were in health care.

In 2000, there were 33 workers who commuted into the municipality and 560 workers who commuted away. The municipality is a net exporter of workers, with about 17.0 workers leaving the municipality for every one entering. Of the working population, 25.7% used public transportation to get to work, and 52.8% used a private car.

== Religion ==
From the 2000 census, 249 or 20.1% were Roman Catholic, while 688 or 55.6% belonged to the Swiss Reformed Church. Of the rest of the population, there was 1 member of an Orthodox church who belonged, there was 1 individual who belongs to the Christian Catholic Church, and there were 20 individuals (or about 1.62% of the population) who belonged to another Christian church. There were 33 (or about 2.67% of the population) who were Islamic. There was 1 person who was Buddhist and 2 individuals who belonged to another church. 213 (or about 17.22% of the population) belonged to no church, are agnostic or atheist, and 29 individuals (or about 2.34% of the population) did not answer the question.

== Education ==
In Lupsingen about 503 or (40.7%) of the population have completed non-mandatory upper secondary education, and 238 or (19.2%) have completed additional higher education (either university or a Fachhochschule). Of the 238 who completed tertiary schooling, 68.9% were Swiss men, 22.7% were Swiss women, 5.9% were non-Swiss men and 2.5% were non-Swiss women.

As of 2000, there were 109 students from Lupsingen who attended schools outside the municipality.
