= Lausen =

- Municipality
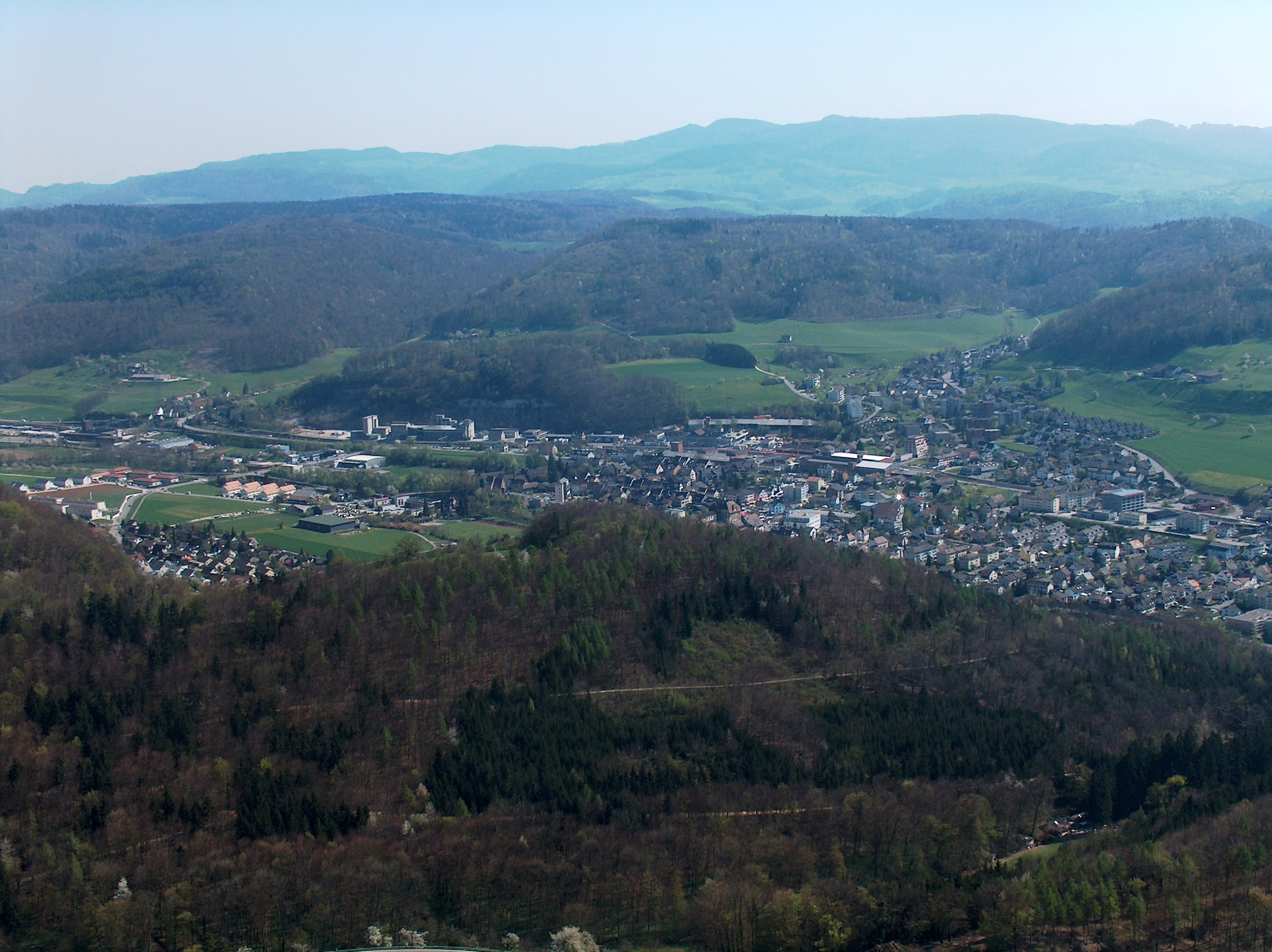

- Coat of arms
- Location of Lausen
- Location within Switzerland Location within Canton of Basel-Landschaft
- Coordinates: 47°28′N 7°46′E
- Country: Switzerland
- Canton: Basel-Landschaft
- District: Liestal

Government
  - Mayor: Ernst Dill-Gysin

Area
  - Total: 5.56 km^{2} (2.15 sq mi)
- Elevation: 343 m (1,125 ft)

Population (2003)
  - Total: 5,588
  - Density: 1,010/km^{2} (2,600/sq mi)
- Time zone: UTC+01:00 (CET)
  - Summer (DST): UTC+02:00 (CEST)
- Postal code: 4415
- SFOS number: 2828
- ISO 3166 code: CH-BL
- Surrounded by: Bubendorf, Hersberg, Itingen, Liestal, Ramlinsburg, Sissach
- Website: lausen.ch

Lausen is a municipality in the district of Liestal in the canton of Basel-Country in Switzerland.

== History ==
Lausen is first mentioned in 1275 as in villa et banno Langenso. In 1305 it became the property of the Bishop of Basel, passing in 1400 to the city of Basel.

== Geography ==
Aerial view (1949)

Lausen has an area, as of 2009, of 5.56 square kilometers (2.15 sq mi). Of this area, 1.31 km^{2} (0.51 sq mi) or 23.6% is used for agricultural purposes, while 2.81 km^{2} (1.08 sq mi) or 50.5% is forested. Of the rest of the land, 1.39 km^{2} (0.54 sq mi) or 25.0% is settled (buildings or roads), 0.03 km^{2} (7.4 acres) or 0.5% is either rivers or lakes and 0.02 km^{2} (4.9 acres) or 0.4% is unproductive land.

Of the built up area, industrial buildings made up 3.8% of the total area while housing and buildings made up 12.9% and transportation infrastructure made up 5.4%. Power and water infrastructure as well as other special developed areas made up 1.3% of the area while parks, green belts and sports fields made up 1.6%. Out of the forested land, 48.4% of the total land area is heavily forested and 2.2% is covered with orchards or small clusters of trees. Of the agricultural land, 9.5% is used for growing crops and 12.4% is pastures, while 1.6% is used for orchards or vine crops. All the water in the municipality is flowing water.

The municipality is located in the Liestal district, in the mid-Ergolz valley, south-east of Liestal.

== Coat of arms ==
The blazon of the municipal coat of arms is Gules, two pick-axes Or in saltire, in Chief Sable three Bezants one and two.

== Demographics ==
Lausen has a population (as of June 2021) of 5,588. As of 2008, 23.9% of the population are resident foreign nationals. Over the last 10 years (1997–2007) the population has changed at a rate of 5.7%.

Most of the population (as of 2000) speaks German (3,953 or 85.1%), with Italian language being second most common (272 or 5.9%) and Albanian being third (89 or 1.9%). There are 43 people who speak French and 4 people who speak Romansh.

As of 2008, the gender distribution of the population was 49.4% male and 50.6% female. The population was made up of 3,674 Swiss citizens (75.6% of the population), and 1,184 non-Swiss residents (24.4%) Of the population in the municipality 1,040 or about 22.4% were born in Lausen and lived there in 2000. There were 1,357 or 29.2% who were born in the same canton, while 1,156 or 24.9% were born somewhere else in Switzerland, and 981 or 21.1% were born outside of Switzerland.

In 2008 there were 22 live births to Swiss citizens and 6 births to non-Swiss citizens, and in same time span there were 38 deaths of Swiss citizens and 1 non-Swiss citizen death. Ignoring immigration and emigration, the population of Swiss citizens decreased by 16 while the foreign population increased by 5. There were 11 Swiss men and 1 Swiss woman who emigrated from Switzerland. At the same time, there were 13 non-Swiss men and 10 non-Swiss women who immigrated from another country to Switzerland. The total Swiss population change in 2008 (from all sources, including moves across municipal borders) was an increase of 30 and the non-Swiss population decreased by 1 people. This represents a population growth rate of 0.6%.

The age distribution, as of 2010, in Lausen is; 311 children or 6.4% of the population are between 0 and 6 years old and 694 teenagers or 14.3% are between 7 and 19. Of the adult population, 693 people or 14.3% of the population are between 20 and 29 years old. 656 people or 13.5% are between 30 and 39, 844 people or 17.4% are between 40 and 49, and 988 people or 20.3% are between 50 and 64. The senior population distribution is 507 people or 10.4% of the population are between 65 and 79 years old and there are 165 people or 3.4% who are over 80.

As of 2000, there were 1,944 people who were single and never married in the municipality. There were 2,311 married individuals, 186 widows or widowers and 204 individuals who are divorced.

As of 2000, there were 1,822 private households in the municipality, and an average of 2.5 persons per household. There were 468 households that consist of only one person and 157 households with five or more people. Out of a total of 1,847 households that answered this question, 25.3% were households made up of just one person and 15 were adults who lived with their parents. Of the rest of the households, there are 574 married couples without children, 652 married couples with children There were 94 single parents with a child or children. There were 19 households that were made up unrelated people and 25 households that were made some sort of institution or another collective housing.

In 2000 there were 767 single family homes (or 71.7% of the total) out of a total of 1,069 inhabited buildings. There were 175 multi-family buildings (16.4%), along with 71 multi-purpose buildings that were mostly used for housing (6.6%) and 56 other use buildings (commercial or industrial) that also had some housing (5.2%). Of the single family homes 34 were built before 1919, while 112 were built between 1990 and 2000. The greatest number of single family homes (175) were built between 1971 and 1980.

In 2000 there were 1,986 apartments in the municipality. The most common apartment size was 4 rooms of which there were 728. There were 42 single room apartments and 591 apartments with five or more rooms. Of these apartments, a total of 1,793 apartments (90.3% of the total) were permanently occupied, while 113 apartments (5.7%) were seasonally occupied and 80 apartments (4.0%) were empty. As of 2007, the construction rate of new housing units was 3.6 new units per 1000 residents. As of 2000 the average price to rent a two-room apartment was about 892.00 CHF (US$710, £400, €570), a three-room apartment was about 1144.00 CHF (US$920, £510, €730) and a four-room apartment cost an average of 1278.00 CHF (US$1020, £580, €820). The vacancy rate for the municipality, in 2008, was 0.59%.

The historical population is given in the following chart:

== Heritage sites of national significance ==
Bettenach, a Roman era through High Middle Ages settlement, is listed as a Swiss heritage site of national significance. The entire Lausen area is part of the Inventory of Swiss Heritage Sites.

== Politics ==
In the 2007 federal election the most popular party was the SVP which received 33.9% of the vote. The next three most popular parties were the SP (25.23%), the FDP (16.23%) and the Green Party (12.52%). In the federal election, a total of 1,453 votes were cast, and the voter turnout was 48.4%.

== Economy ==
As of 2007, Lausen had an unemployment rate of 2.67%. As of 2005, there were 30 people employed in the primary economic sector and about 7 businesses involved in this sector. 476 people were employed in the secondary sector and there were 42 businesses in this sector. 737 people were employed in the tertiary sector, with 117 businesses in this sector. There were 2,513 residents of the municipality who were employed in some capacity, of which females made up 44.8% of the workforce.

In 2008 the total number of full-time equivalent jobs was 1,187. The number of jobs in the primary sector was 13, all of which were in agriculture. The number of jobs in the secondary sector was 539, of which 409 or (75.9%) were in manufacturing and 124 (23.0%) were in construction. The number of jobs in the tertiary sector was 635. In the tertiary sector; 237 or 37.3% were in wholesale or retail sales or the repair of motor vehicles, 58 or 9.1% were in the movement and storage of goods, 10 or 1.6% were in a hotel or restaurant, 4 or 0.6% were in the information industry, 3 or 0.5% were the insurance or financial industry, 68 or 10.7% were technical professionals or scientists, 53 or 8.3% were in education and 71 or 11.2% were in health care.

In 2000, there were 1,056 workers who commuted into the municipality and 1,985 workers who commuted away. The municipality is a net exporter of workers, with about 1.9 workers leaving the municipality for every one entering. About 8.8% of the workforce coming into Lausen are coming from outside Switzerland, while 0.2% of the locals commute out of Switzerland for work. Of the working population, 25.8% used public transportation to get to work, and 44.7% used a private car.

=== Partial list of companies in Lausen ===
- Ronda AG

== Religion ==
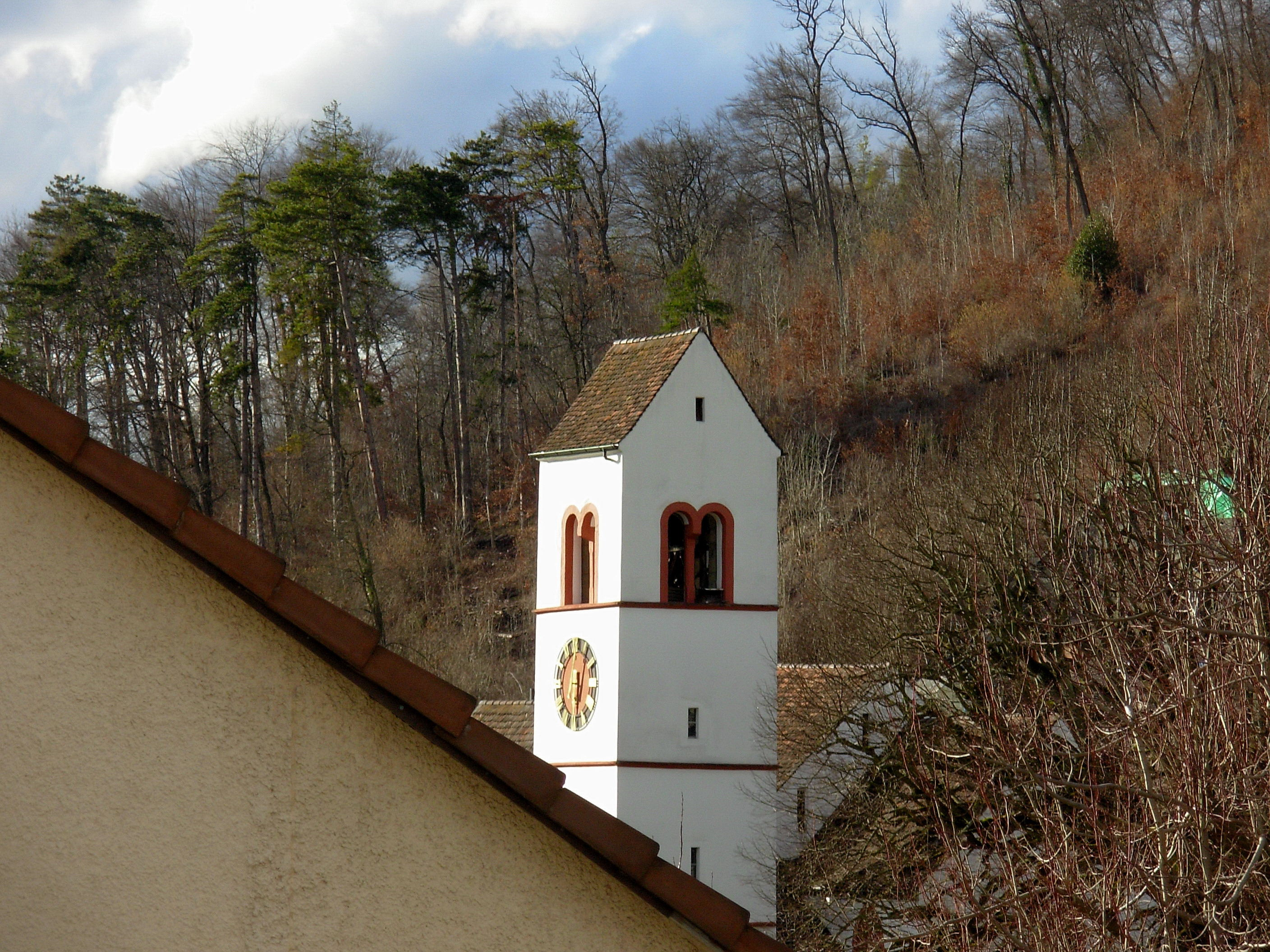
Church tower of the village church

From the 2000 census, 1,241 or 26.7% were Roman Catholic, while 2,224 or 47.9% belonged to the Swiss Reformed Church. Of the rest of the population, there were 63 members of an Orthodox church (or about 1.36% of the population), there were 4 individuals (or about 0.09% of the population) who belonged to the Christian Catholic Church, and there were 131 individuals (or about 2.82% of the population) who belonged to another Christian church. There was 1 individual who was Jewish, and 341 (or about 7.34% of the population) who were Islamic. There were 5 individuals who were Buddhist, 7 individuals who were Hindu and 3 individuals who belonged to another church. 512 (or about 11.02% of the population) belonged to no church, are agnostic or atheist, and 113 individuals (or about 2.43% of the population) did not answer the question.

== Transport ==
Lausen sits on the Hauenstein line and is served by trains at Lausen railway station.

== Education ==
In Lausen about 1,803 or (38.8%) of the population have completed non-mandatory upper secondary education, and 495 or (10.7%) have completed additional higher education (either university or a Fachhochschule). Of the 495 who completed tertiary schooling, 62.4% were Swiss men, 22.4% were Swiss women, 10.3% were non-Swiss men and 4.8% were non-Swiss women.

As of 2000, there was 1 student in Lausen who came from another municipality, while 341 residents attended schools outside the municipality.
