= Bubendorf =

- Municipality
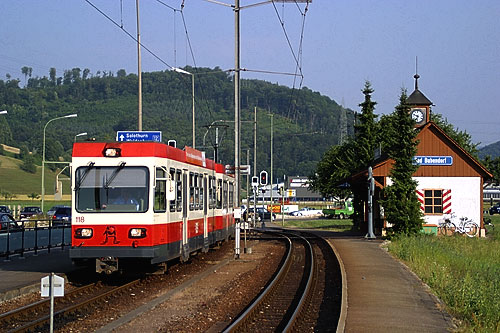

- Coat of arms
- Location of Bubendorf
- Location within Switzerland Location within Canton of Basel-Landschaft
- Coordinates: 47°27′N 7°44′E
- Country: Switzerland
- Canton: Basel-Landschaft
- District: Liestal

Area
  - Total: 10.81 km^{2} (4.17 sq mi)
- Elevation: 471 m (1,545 ft)

Population (June 2021)
  - Total: 4,369
  - Density: 404.2/km^{2} (1,047/sq mi)
- Time zone: UTC+01:00 (CET)
  - Summer (DST): UTC+02:00 (CEST)
- Postal code: 4416
- SFOS number: 2823
- ISO 3166 code: CH-BL
- Surrounded by: Arboldswil, Hölstein, Lampenberg, Lausen, Liestal, Lupsingen, Niederdorf, Ramlinsburg, Seltisberg, Ziefen
- Website: bubendorf.bl.ch

Bubendorf is a municipality in the district of Liestal in the canton of Basel-Country in Switzerland.

== History ==
Bubendorf is first mentioned in 1152 as Bouenonowe.

== Geography ==
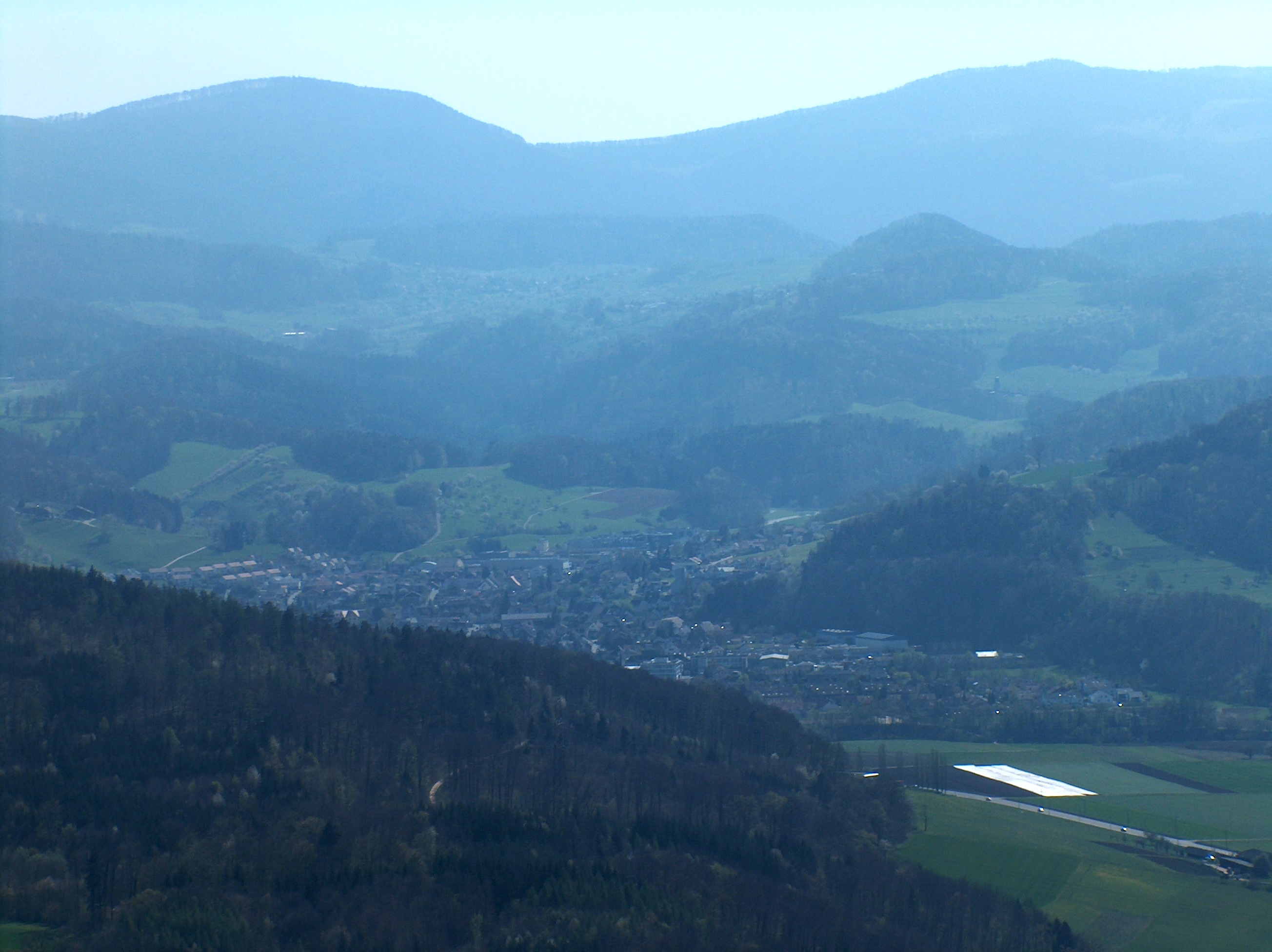
Bubendorf village and surroundings

Aerial view (1967)

Bubendorf has an area, as of 2009, of 10.8 square kilometers (4.2 sq mi). Of this area, 4.12 km^{2} (1.59 sq mi) or 38.1% is used for agricultural purposes, while 4.98 km^{2} (1.92 sq mi) or 46.1% is forested. Of the rest of the land, 1.61 km^{2} (0.62 sq mi) or 14.9% is settled (buildings or roads), 0.11 km^{2} (27 acres) or 1.0% is either rivers or lakes and 0.02 km^{2} (4.9 acres) or 0.2% is unproductive land.

Of the built-up area, industrial buildings made up 2.0% of the total area while housing and buildings made up 7.6% and transportation infrastructure made up 4.1%.

Out of the forested land, 43.6% of the total land area is heavily forested and 2.5% is covered with orchards or small clusters of trees.

Of the agricultural land, 15.1% is used for growing crops and 21.0% is pastures, while 2.0% is used for orchards or vine crops. All the water in the municipality is flowing water.

The municipality is located in the Liestal district, at the entrance to the Reigoldswiler valley. It consists of the linear village of Bubendorf.

== Coat of arms ==
The blazon of the municipal coat of arms is Per bend dentilly Sable and Argent.

== Demographics ==
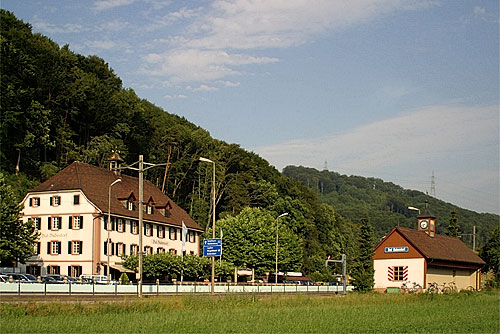
Bad Budendorf, a historic hotel and station on the Waldenburgerbahn rail line

Bubendorf has a population (as of June 2021) of 4,369. As of 2008, 12.3% of the population are resident foreign nationals. Over the last 10 years (1997–2007) the population has changed at a rate of 5.2%.

Most of the population (as of 2000) speaks German (3,925 or 92.1%), with Italian language being second most common (77 or 1.8%) and Albanian being third (61 or 1.4%). There are 30 people who speak French and 2 people who speak Romansh.

As of 2008, the gender distribution of the population was 50.7% male and 49.3% female. The population was made up of 3,807 Swiss citizens (86.3% of the population), and 603 non-Swiss residents (13.7%) Of the population in the municipality 1,081 or about 25.4% were born in Bubendorf and lived there in 2000. There were 1,300 or 30.5% who were born in the same canton, while 1,179 or 27.7% were born somewhere else in Switzerland, and 572 or 13.4% were born outside of Switzerland.

In 2008 there were 35 live births to Swiss citizens and 3 births to non-Swiss citizens, and in same time span there were 21 deaths of Swiss citizens. Ignoring immigration and emigration, the population of Swiss citizens increased by 14 while the foreign population increased by 3. There was 1 Swiss man who emigrated from Switzerland. At the same time, there were 9 non-Swiss men and 7 non-Swiss women who immigrated from another country to Switzerland. The total Swiss population change in 2008 (from all sources, including moves across municipal borders) was a decrease of 8 and the non-Swiss population increased by 4 people. This represents a population growth rate of -0.1%.

The age distribution, as of 2010, in Bubendorf is; 256 children or 5.8% of the population are between 0 and 6 years old and 807 teenagers or 18.3% are between 7 and 19. Of the adult population, 528 people or 12.0% of the population are between 20 and 29 years old. 459 people or 10.4% are between 30 and 39, 803 people or 18.2% are between 40 and 49, and 944 people or 21.4% are between 50 and 64. The senior population distribution is 445 people or 10.1% of the population are between 65 and 79 years old and there are 168 people or 3.8% who are over 80.

As of 2000, there were 1,819 people who were single and never married in the municipality. There were 2,161 married individuals, 140 widows or widowers and 142 individuals who are divorced.

As of 2000, there were 1,563 private households in the municipality, and an average of 2.7 persons per household. There were 349 households that consist of only one person and 163 households with five or more people. Out of a total of 1,592 households that answered this question, 21.9% were households made up of just one person and 11 were adults who lived with their parents. Of the rest of the households, there are 451 married couples without children, 661 married couples with children There were 74 single parents with a child or children. There were 17 households that were made up unrelated people and 29 households that were made some sort of institution or another collective housing.

In 2000 there were 836 single family homes (or 76.7% of the total) out of a total of 1,090 inhabited buildings. There were 134 multi-family buildings (12.3%), along with 83 multi-purpose buildings that were mostly used for housing (7.6%) and 37 other use buildings (commercial or industrial) that also had some housing (3.4%). Of the single family homes 58 were built before 1919, while 273 were built between 1990 and 2000. The greatest number of single family homes (208) were built between 1981 and 1990.

In 2000 there were 1,648 apartments in the municipality. The most common apartment size was 5 rooms of which there were 506. There were 42 single room apartments and 756 apartments with five or more rooms. Of these apartments, a total of 1,512 apartments (91.7% of the total) were permanently occupied, while 101 apartments (6.1%) were seasonally occupied and 35 apartments (2.1%) were empty. As of 2007, the construction rate of new housing units was 12.5 new units per 1000 residents. As of 2000 the average price to rent a two-room apartment was about 836.00 CHF (US$670, £380, €540), a three-room apartment was about 1095.00 CHF (US$880, £490, €700) and a four-room apartment cost an average of 1403.00 CHF (US$1120, £630, €900). The vacancy rate for the municipality, in 2008, was 0.96%.

The historical population is given in the following chart:

== Heritage sites of national significance ==
Wildenstein Castle is listed as a Swiss heritage site of national significance.

== Politics ==
In the 2007 federal election the most popular party was the SVP which received 29.3% of the vote. The next three most popular parties were the SP (24.86%), the FDP (17.24%) and the Green Party (13.94%). In the federal election, a total of 1,557 votes were cast, and the voter turnout was 52.5%.

== Economy ==
As of 2007, Bubendorf had an unemployment rate of 1.65%. As of 2005, there were 59 people employed in the primary economic sector and about 21 businesses involved in this sector. 1,108 people were employed in the secondary sector and there were 56 businesses in this sector. 710 people were employed in the tertiary sector, with 121 businesses in this sector. There were 2,150 residents of the municipality who were employed in some capacity, of which females made up 42.3% of the workforce.

In 2008 the total number of full-time equivalent jobs was 2,024. The number of jobs in the primary sector was 32, of which 28 were in agriculture and 4 were in forestry or lumber production. The number of jobs in the secondary sector was 1,287, of which 970 or (75.4%) were in manufacturing and 300 (23.3%) were in construction. The number of jobs in the tertiary sector was 705. In the tertiary sector; 283 or 40.1% were in wholesale or retail sales or the repair of motor vehicles, 47 or 6.7% were in the movement and storage of goods, 113 or 16.0% were in a hotel or restaurant, 15 or 2.1% were in the information industry, 11 or 1.6% were the insurance or financial industry, 42 or 6.0% were technical professionals or scientists, 32 or 4.5% were in education and 93 or 13.2% were in health care.

In 2000, there were 1,424 workers who commuted into the municipality and 1,590 workers who commuted away. The municipality is a net exporter of workers, with about 1.1 workers leaving the municipality for every one entering. About 9.3% of the workforce coming into Bubendorf are coming from outside Switzerland, while 0.2% of the locals commute out of Switzerland for work. Of the working population, 24.5% used public transportation to get to work, and 43.9% used a private car.

== Religion ==
From the 2000 census, 844 or 19.8% were Roman Catholic, while 2,480 or 58.2% belonged to the Swiss Reformed Church. Of the rest of the population, there were 11 members of an Orthodox church (or about 0.26% of the population), there were 6 individuals (or about 0.14% of the population) who belonged to the Christian Catholic Church, and there were 154 individuals (or about 3.61% of the population) who belonged to another Christian church. There was 1 individual who was Jewish, and 141 (or about 3.31% of the population) who were Islamic. There were 10 individuals who were Buddhist, 26 individuals who were Hindu and 3 individuals who belonged to another church. 442 (or about 10.37% of the population) belonged to no church, are agnostic or atheist, and 144 individuals (or about 3.38% of the population) did not answer the question.

== Education ==
In Bubendorf about 1,632 or (38.3%) of the population have completed non-mandatory upper secondary education, and 586 or (13.7%) have completed additional higher education (either university or a Fachhochschule). Of the 586 who completed tertiary schooling, 65.9% were Swiss men, 22.5% were Swiss women, 7.7% were non-Swiss men and 3.9% were non-Swiss women.

As of 2000, there were 12 students in Bubendorf who came from another municipality, while 355 residents attended schools outside the municipality.

== Transport ==
Bubendorf is served by the Waldenburg narrow gauge railway, which operates a quarter-hourly train service to Liestal. At Liestal railway station, onward connection is made with the Swiss Federal Railway's services to Basel, Bern, Lucerne and Zürich.

Bubendorf is also served by a half-hourly bus service on the line Liestal – Reigoldswil.
