= Seltisberg =

- Municipality
- Coat of arms
- Location of Seltisberg
- Location within Switzerland Location within Canton of Basel-Landschaft
- Coordinates: 47°28′N 7°43′E
- Country: Switzerland
- Canton: Basel-Landschaft
- District: Liestal

Area
  - Total: 3.57 km^{2} (1.38 sq mi)
- Elevation: 491 m (1,611 ft)

Population (June 2021)
  - Total: 1,313
  - Density: 368/km^{2} (953/sq mi)
- Time zone: UTC+01:00 (CET)
  - Summer (DST): UTC+02:00 (CEST)
- Postal code: 4411
- SFOS number: 2833
- ISO 3166 code: CH-BL
- Surrounded by: Bubendorf, Liestal, Lupsingen, Nuglar-Sankt Pantaleon (SO)
- Website: seltisberg.ch

Seltisberg is a municipality in the district of Liestal in the canton of Basel-Landschaft in Switzerland.

== History ==
Seltisberg is first mentioned in 1194 as Selboldisberch.

== Geography ==
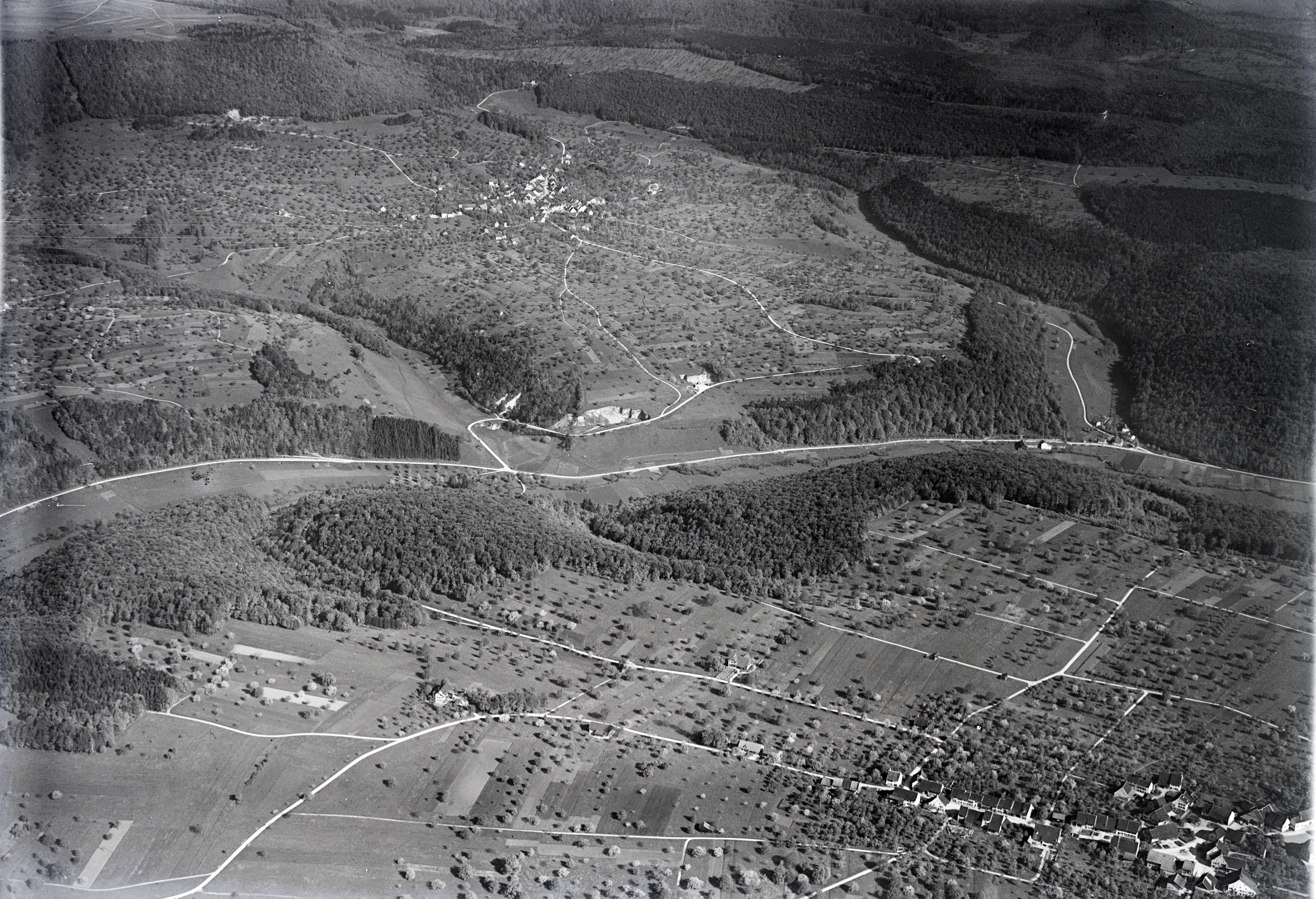
Aerial view from 900 m by Walter Mittelholzer (1930)

Seltisberg has an area, as of 2009, of 3.57 square kilometers (1.38 sq mi). Of this area, 1.63 km^{2} (0.63 sq mi) or 45.7% is used for agricultural purposes, while 1.32 km^{2} (0.51 sq mi) or 37.0% is forested. Of the rest of the land, 0.57 km^{2} (0.22 sq mi) or 16.0% is settled (buildings or roads).

Of the built up area, housing and buildings made up 8.7% and transportation infrastructure made up 3.9%. Power and water infrastructure as well as other special developed areas made up 2.2% of the area Out of the forested land, all of the forested land area is covered with heavy forests. Of the agricultural land, 16.5% is used for growing crops and 25.5% is pastures, while 3.6% is used for orchards or vine crops.

The municipality is located in the Liestal district, on a high plateau in the Jura Mountains between the Hinteren Frenken valley and the Oris valley.

== Coat of arms ==
The blazon of the municipal coat of arms is Per fess, Gules, a Rose Argent, centered Or and lapped Vert, and Argent.

== Demographics ==
Seltisberg has a population (as of June 2021) of 1,313. As of 2008, 5.3% of the population are resident foreign nationals. Over the last 10 years (1997–2007) the population has changed at a rate of 11.3%.

Most of the population (as of 2000) speaks German (1,166 or 95.8%), with French being second most common (20 or 1.6%) and English being third (12 or 1.0%). There is 1 person who speaks Romansh.

As of 2008, the gender distribution of the population was 48.1% male and 51.9% female. The population was made up of 1,201 Swiss citizens (93.2% of the population), and 87 non-Swiss residents (6.8%) Of the population in the municipality 300 or about 24.7% were born in Seltisberg and lived there in 2000. There were 384 or 31.6% who were born in the same canton, while 380 or 31.2% were born somewhere else in Switzerland, and 110 or 9.0% were born outside of Switzerland.

In 2008 there were 9 live births to Swiss citizens and were 5 deaths of Swiss citizens. Ignoring immigration and emigration, the population of Swiss citizens increased by 4 while the foreign population remained the same. There were 2 Swiss men who emigrated from Switzerland. At the same time, there was 1 non-Swiss man and 2 non-Swiss women who immigrated from another country to Switzerland. The total Swiss population change in 2008 (from all sources, including moves across municipal borders) was an increase of 9 and the non-Swiss population decreased by 1. This represents a population growth rate of 0.6%.

The age distribution, as of 2010, in Seltisberg is; 66 children or 5.1% of the population are between 0 and 6 years old and 190 teenagers or 14.8% are between 7 and 19. Of the adult population, 134 people or 10.4% of the population are between 20 and 29 years old. 116 people or 9.0% are between 30 and 39, 214 people or 16.6% are between 40 and 49, and 312 people or 24.2% are between 50 and 64. The senior population distribution is 190 people or 14.8% of the population are between 65 and 79 years old and there are 66 people or 5.1% who are over 80.

As of 2000, there were 495 people who were single and never married in the municipality. There were 612 married individuals, 57 widows or widowers and 53 individuals who are divorced.

As of 2000, there were 451 private households in the municipality, and an average of 2.5 persons per household. There were 102 households that consist of only one person and 34 households with five or more people. Out of a total of 462 households that answered this question, 22.1% were households made up of just one person and 7 were adults who lived with their parents. Of the rest of the households, there are 152 married couples without children, 170 married couples with children There were 18 single parents with a child or children. There were 2 households that were made up unrelated people and 11 households that were made some sort of institution or another collective housing.

In 2000 there were 313 single family homes (or 81.3% of the total) out of a total of 385 inhabited buildings. There were 26 multi-family buildings (6.8%), along with 38 multi-purpose buildings that were mostly used for housing (9.9%) and 8 other use buildings (commercial or industrial) that also had some housing (2.1%). Of the single family homes 30 were built before 1919, while 77 were built between 1990 and 2000. The greatest number of single family homes (71) were built between 1971 and 1980.

In 2000 there were 467 apartments in the municipality. The most common apartment size was 5 rooms of which there were 147. There were 10 single room apartments and 275 apartments with five or more rooms. Of these apartments, a total of 445 apartments (95.3% of the total) were permanently occupied, while 15 apartments (3.2%) were seasonally occupied and 7 apartments (1.5%) were empty. As of 2007, the construction rate of new housing units was 1.5 new units per 1000 residents. As of 2000 the average price to rent a two-room apartment was about .00 CHF (US$0, £0, €0), a three-room apartment was about 1076.00 CHF (US$860, £480, €690) and a four-room apartment cost an average of 1698.00 CHF (US$1360, £760, €1090). The vacancy rate for the municipality, in 2008, was 0.19%.

The historical population is given in the following chart:

== Politics ==
In the 2007 federal election the most popular party was the SVP which received 28.61% of the vote. The next three most popular parties were the FDP (22.82%), the SP (18.69%) and the Green Party (15.36%). In the federal election, a total of 600 votes were cast, and the voter turnout was 60.8%.

== Economy ==
As of 2007, Seltisberg had an unemployment rate of 0.99%. As of 2005, there were 6 people employed in the primary economic sector and about 2 businesses involved in this sector. 44 people were employed in the secondary sector and there were 10 businesses in this sector. 111 people were employed in the tertiary sector, with 22 businesses in this sector. There were 583 residents of the municipality who were employed in some capacity, of which females made up 42.7% of the workforce.

In 2008 the total number of full-time equivalent jobs was 141. The number of jobs in the primary sector was 5, all of which were in agriculture. The number of jobs in the secondary sector was 38, of which 12 or (31.6%) were in manufacturing and 26 (68.4%) were in construction. The number of jobs in the tertiary sector was 98. In the tertiary sector; 5 or 5.1% were in wholesale or retail sales or the repair of motor vehicles, 8 or 8.2% were in the movement and storage of goods, 5 or 5.1% were in a hotel or restaurant, 4 or 4.1% were in the information industry, 26 or 26.5% were technical professionals or scientists, 10 or 10.2% were in education and 37 or 37.8% were in health care.

In 2000, there were 99 workers who commuted into the municipality and 474 workers who commuted away. The municipality is a net exporter of workers, with about 4.8 workers leaving the municipality for every one entering. About 6.1% of the workforce coming into Seltisberg are coming from outside Switzerland. Of the working population, 25.9% used public transportation to get to work, and 49.9% used a private car.

== Religion ==
From the 2000 census, 243 or 20.0% were Roman Catholic, while 762 or 62.6% belonged to the Swiss Reformed Church. Of the rest of the population, there were 3 members of an Orthodox church (or about 0.25% of the population), there were 2 individuals (or about 0.16% of the population) who belonged to the Christian Catholic Church, and there were 29 individuals (or about 2.38% of the population) who belonged to another Christian church. There were 7 (or about 0.58% of the population) who were Islamic. There were 2 individuals who were Buddhist and 1 person who was Hindu. 132 (or about 10.85% of the population) belonged to no church, are agnostic or atheist, and 36 individuals (or about 2.96% of the population) did not answer the question.

== Education ==
In Seltisberg about 496 or (40.8%) of the population have completed non-mandatory upper secondary education, and 246 or (20.2%) have completed additional higher education (either university or a Fachhochschule). Of the 246 who completed tertiary schooling, 69.5% were Swiss men, 23.6% were Swiss women, 3.7% were non-Swiss men and 3.3% were non-Swiss women.

As of 2000, there were 6 students in Seltisberg who came from another municipality, while 122 residents attended schools outside the municipality.
