= Zunzgen =

- Municipality
- Coat of arms
- Location of Zunzgen
- Location within Switzerland Location within Canton of Basel-Landschaft
- Coordinates: 47°27′N 7°48′E
- Country: Switzerland
- Canton: Basel-Landschaft
- District: Sissach

Area
  - Total: 6.88 km^{2} (2.66 sq mi)
- Elevation: 397 m (1,302 ft)

Population (June 2021)
  - Total: 2,674
  - Density: 389/km^{2} (1,010/sq mi)
- Time zone: UTC+01:00 (CET)
  - Summer (DST): UTC+02:00 (CEST)
- Postal code: 4455
- SFOS number: 2869
- ISO 3166 code: CH-BL
- Surrounded by: Hölstein, Itingen, Ramlinsburg, Sissach, Tenniken, Thürnen
- Website: www.zunzgen.ch

Zunzgen is a municipality in the district of Sissach in the canton of Basel-Country in Switzerland.

== Geography ==
Aerial view from 800 m by Walter Mittelholzer (1922)

Zunzgen has an area, as of 2009, of 6.88 square kilometers (2.66 sq mi). Of this area, 2.62 km^{2} (1.01 sq mi) or 38.1% is used for agricultural purposes, while 3.43 km^{2} (1.32 sq mi) or 49.9% is forested. Of the rest of the land, 0.83 km^{2} (0.32 sq mi) or 12.1% is settled (buildings or roads), 0.01 km^{2} (2.5 acres) or 0.1% is either rivers or lakes.

Of the built up area, housing and buildings made up 6.0% and transportation infrastructure made up 4.1%. Out of the forested land, all of the forested land area is covered with heavy forests. Of the agricultural land, 15.8% is used for growing crops and 13.4% is pastures, while 8.9% is used for orchards or vine crops. All the water in the municipality is flowing water.

== Coat of arms ==
The blazon of the municipal coat of arms is "Or, a Tower masoned embateled Sable issuant from a mount Gules."

== Demographics ==
Zunzgen has a population (as of June 2021) of 2,674. As of 2008, 15.1% of the population are resident foreign nationals. Over the last 10 years (1997–2007) the population has changed at a rate of 0.8%.

Most of the population (as of 2000) speaks German (2,194 or 90.2%), with Italian language being second most common (96 or 3.9%) and Albanian being third (29 or 1.2%). There are 15 people who speak French and 1 person who speaks Romansh.

As of 2008, the gender distribution of the population was 50.1% male and 49.9% female. The population was made up of 2,118 Swiss citizens (84.7% of the population), and 383 non-Swiss residents (15.3%) Of the population in the municipality 625 or about 25.7% were born in Zunzgen and lived there in 2000. There were 803 or 33.0% who were born in the same canton, while 577 or 23.7% were born somewhere else in Switzerland, and 362 or 14.9% were born outside of Switzerland.

In 2008 there were 9 live births to Swiss citizens and 6 births to non-Swiss citizens, and in same time span there were 10 deaths of Swiss citizens and 2 non-Swiss citizen deaths. Ignoring immigration and emigration, the population of Swiss citizens decreased by 1 while the foreign population increased by 4. There was 1 Swiss man and 2 Swiss women who emigrated from Switzerland. At the same time, there was 1 non-Swiss man who emigrated from Switzerland to another country and 3 non-Swiss women who immigrated from another country to Switzerland. The total Swiss population change in 2008 (from all sources, including moves across municipal borders) was a decrease of 17 and the non-Swiss population decreased by 24 people. This represents a population growth rate of -1.6%.

The age distribution, as of 2010, in Zunzgen is; 141 children or 5.6% of the population are between 0 and 6 years old and 381 teenagers or 15.2% are between 7 and 19. Of the adult population, 303 people or 12.1% of the population are between 20 and 29 years old. 277 people or 11.1% are between 30 and 39, 422 people or 16.9% are between 40 and 49, and 553 people or 22.1% are between 50 and 64. The senior population distribution is 347 people or 13.9% of the population are between 65 and 79 years old and there are 77 people or 3.1% who are over 80.

As of 2000, there were 979 people who were single and never married in the municipality. There were 1,228 married individuals, 102 widows or widowers and 124 individuals who are divorced.

As of 2000, there were 950 private households in the municipality, and an average of 2.5 persons per household. There were 224 households that consist of only one person and 73 households with five or more people. Out of a total of 969 households that answered this question, 23.1% were households made up of just one person and 5 were adults who lived with their parents. Of the rest of the households, there are 308 married couples without children, 346 married couples with children There were 58 single parents with a child or children. There were 9 households that were made up unrelated people and 19 households that were made some sort of institution or another collective housing.

In 2000 there were 486 single family homes (or 74.9% of the total) out of a total of 649 inhabited buildings. There were 100 multi-family buildings (15.4%), along with 45 multi-purpose buildings that were mostly used for housing (6.9%) and 18 other use buildings (commercial or industrial) that also had some housing (2.8%). Of the single family homes 31 were built before 1919, while 60 were built between 1990 and 2000. The greatest number of single family homes (243) were built between 1981 and 1990.

In 2000 there were 998 apartments in the municipality. The most common apartment size was 4 rooms of which there were 352. There were 23 single room apartments and 331 apartments with five or more rooms. Of these apartments, a total of 926 apartments (92.8% of the total) were permanently occupied, while 47 apartments (4.7%) were seasonally occupied and 25 apartments (2.5%) were empty. As of 2009, the construction rate of new housing units was 1.2 new units per 1000 residents. As of 2000 the average price to rent a two-room apartment was about 829.00 CHF (US$660, £370, €530), a three-room apartment was about 977.00 CHF (US$780, £440, €630) and a four-room apartment cost an average of 1293.00 CHF (US$1030, £580, €830). The vacancy rate for the municipality, in 2010, was 0.09%.

The historical population is given in the following chart:

== Heritage sites of national significance ==
The Zunzger Büchel, the remains of a prehistoric fortified hill, is listed as a Swiss heritage site of national significance.

== Politics ==
In the 2007 federal election the most popular party was the SVP which received 35.72% of the vote. The next three most popular parties were the SP (25.05%), the Green Party (16.42%) and the FDP (13.27%). In the federal election, a total of 780 votes were cast, and the voter turnout was 45.6%.

== Economy ==
As of 2010, Zunzgen had an unemployment rate of 3.3%. As of 2008, there were 95 people employed in the primary economic sector and about 16 businesses involved in this sector. 107 people were employed in the secondary sector and there were 19 businesses in this sector. 203 people were employed in the tertiary sector, with 51 businesses in this sector. There were 1,302 residents of the municipality who were employed in some capacity, of which females made up 43.2% of the workforce.

In 2008 the total number of full-time equivalent jobs was 313. The number of jobs in the primary sector was 56, all of which were in agriculture. The number of jobs in the secondary sector was 98, of which 82 or (83.7%) were in manufacturing and 15 (15.3%) were in construction. The number of jobs in the tertiary sector was 159. In the tertiary sector; 53 or 33.3% were in wholesale or retail sales or the repair of motor vehicles, 5 or 3.1% were in the movement and storage of goods, 18 or 11.3% were in a hotel or restaurant, 2 or 1.3% were the insurance or financial industry, 28 or 17.6% were technical professionals or scientists, 11 or 6.9% were in education and 13 or 8.2% were in health care.

In 2000, there were 290 workers who commuted into the municipality and 1,055 workers who commuted away. The municipality is a net exporter of workers, with about 3.6 workers leaving the municipality for every one entering. About 8.6% of the workforce coming into Zunzgen are coming from outside Switzerland. Of the working population, 23.7% used public transportation to get to work, and 54.4% used a private car.

== Religion ==
From the 2000 census, 532 or 21.9% were Roman Catholic, while 1,411 or 58.0% belonged to the Swiss Reformed Church. Of the rest of the population, there were 10 members of an Orthodox church (or about 0.41% of the population), there were 4 individuals (or about 0.16% of the population) who belonged to the Christian Catholic Church, and there were 58 individuals (or about 2.38% of the population) who belonged to another Christian church. There were 87 (or about 3.58% of the population) who were Islamic. There were 3 individuals who were Buddhist and 3 individuals who belonged to another church. 255 (or about 10.48% of the population) belonged to no church, are agnostic or atheist, and 70 individuals (or about 2.88% of the population) did not answer the question.

== Education ==
In Zunzgen about 1,023 or (42.0%) of the population have completed non-mandatory upper secondary education, and 241 or (9.9%) have completed additional higher education (either university or a Fachhochschule). Of the 241 who completed tertiary schooling, 62.7% were Swiss men, 24.5% were Swiss women, 7.9% were non-Swiss men and 5.0% were non-Swiss women.

As of 2000, there were 19 students in Zunzgen who came from another municipality, while 233 residents attended schools outside the municipality.
