= Itingen =

- Municipality
- Coat of arms
- Location of Itingen
- Location within Switzerland Location within Canton of Basel-Landschaft
- Coordinates: 47°28′N 7°47′E
- Country: Switzerland
- Canton: Basel-Landschaft
- District: Sissach

Area
  - Total: 3.14 km^{2} (1.21 sq mi)
- Elevation: 363 m (1,191 ft)

Population (June 2021)
  - Total: 2,216
  - Density: 706/km^{2} (1,830/sq mi)
- Time zone: UTC+01:00 (CET)
  - Summer (DST): UTC+02:00 (CEST)
- Postal code: 4452
- SFOS number: 2849
- ISO 3166 code: CH-BL
- Surrounded by: Lausen, Ramlinsburg, Sissach, Zunzgen
- Website: itingen.ch

Itingen is a municipality in the district of Sissach in the canton of Basel-Country in Switzerland.

== History ==
Itingen is first mentioned in 1226 as Utingen. In 1454 it was mentioned as Uetingen.

== Geography ==
Aerial view (1949)

Itingen has an area, as of 2009, of 3.14 square kilometers (1.21 sq mi). Of this area, 0.9 km^{2} (0.35 sq mi) or 28.7% is used for agricultural purposes, while 1.48 km^{2} (0.57 sq mi) or 47.1% is forested. Of the rest of the land, 0.75 km^{2} (0.29 sq mi) or 23.9% is settled (buildings or roads) and 0.01 km^{2} (2.5 acres) or 0.3% is unproductive land.

Of the built up area, industrial buildings made up 3.2% of the total area while housing and buildings made up 9.6% and transportation infrastructure made up 10.5%. Out of the forested land, 43.6% of the total land area is heavily forested and 3.5% is covered with orchards or small clusters of trees. Of the agricultural land, 11.5% is used for growing crops and 13.1% is pastures, while 4.1% is used for orchards or vine crops.

The municipality is located in the Sissach district, in the mid-Ergolz valley. The old village center is located perpendicular to the old cantonal road and to the left of the Basel-Olten rail line.

== Coat of arms ==
The blazon of the municipal coat of arms is Gules, a Fish nainaint winged Argent.

== Demographics ==
Itingen has a population (as of June 2021) of 2,216. As of 2008, 15.6% of the population are resident foreign nationals. Over the last 10 years (1997–2007) the population has changed at a rate of 16.5%.

Most of the population (as of 2000) speaks German (1,441 or 89.1%), with Italian language being second most common (60 or 3.7%) and Serbo-Croatian being third (41 or 2.5%). There are 14 people who speak French and 2 people who speak Romansh.

As of 2008, the gender distribution of the population was 50.5% male and 49.5% female. The population was made up of 1,545 Swiss citizens (82.7% of the population), and 323 non-Swiss residents (17.3%) Of the population in the municipality 357 or about 22.1% were born in Itingen and lived there in 2000. There were 527 or 32.6% who were born in the same canton, while 448 or 27.7% were born somewhere else in Switzerland, and 262 or 16.2% were born outside of Switzerland.

In 2008 there were 12 live births to Swiss citizens and 1 birth to non-Swiss citizens, and in same time span there were 12 deaths of Swiss citizens and 2 non-Swiss citizen deaths. Ignoring immigration and emigration, the population of Swiss citizens remained the same while the foreign population decreased by 1. There were 2 Swiss men and 2 Swiss women who immigrated back to Switzerland. At the same time, there were 8 non-Swiss men and 1 non-Swiss woman who immigrated from another country to Switzerland. The total Swiss population change in 2008 (from all sources, including moves across municipal borders) was an increase of 28 and the non-Swiss population decreased by 11 people. This represents a population growth rate of 0.9%.

The age distribution, as of 2010, in Itingen is; 119 children or 6.4% of the population are between 0 and 6 years old and 259 teenagers or 13.9% are between 7 and 19. Of the adult population, 237 people or 12.7% of the population are between 20 and 29 years old. 258 people or 13.8% are between 30 and 39, 301 people or 16.1% are between 40 and 49, and 442 people or 23.7% are between 50 and 64. The senior population distribution is 197 people or 10.5% of the population are between 65 and 79 years old and there are 55 people or 2.9% who are over 80.

As of 2000, there were 631 people who were single and never married in the municipality. There were 836 married individuals, 79 widows or widowers and 72 individuals who are divorced.

As of 2000, there were 669 private households in the municipality, and an average of 2.4 persons per household. There were 182 households that consist of only one person and 34 households with five or more people. Out of a total of 672 households that answered this question, 27.1% were households made up of just one person and 3 were adults who lived with their parents. Of the rest of the households, there are 206 married couples without children, 235 married couples with children There were 33 single parents with a child or children. There were 10 households that were made up unrelated people and 3 households that were made some sort of institution or another collective housing.

In 2000 there were 354 single family homes (or 73.4% of the total) out of a total of 482 inhabited buildings. There were 78 multi-family buildings (16.2%), along with 38 multi-purpose buildings that were mostly used for housing (7.9%) and 12 other use buildings (commercial or industrial) that also had some housing (2.5%). Of the single family homes 20 were built before 1919, while 75 were built between 1990 and 2000. The greatest number of single family homes (105) were built between 1981 and 1990.

In 2000 there were 696 apartments in the municipality. The most common apartment size was 4 rooms of which there were 221. There were 7 single room apartments and 290 apartments with five or more rooms. Of these apartments, a total of 657 apartments (94.4% of the total) were permanently occupied, while 19 apartments (2.7%) were seasonally occupied and 20 apartments (2.9%) were empty. As of 2007, the construction rate of new housing units was 1.7 new units per 1000 residents. As of 2000 the average price to rent a two-room apartment was about 905.00 CHF (US$720, £410, €580), a three-room apartment was about 1014.00 CHF (US$810, £460, €650) and a four-room apartment cost an average of 1437.00 CHF (US$1150, £650, €920). The vacancy rate for the municipality, in 2008, was 0.38%.

The historical population is given in the following chart:

== Sights ==
The entire village of Itingen is designated as part of the Inventory of Swiss Heritage Sites.

== Politics ==
In the 2007 federal election the most popular party was the SVP which received 29.97% of the vote. The next three most popular parties were the SP (25.14%), the FDP (19.1%) and the Green Party (16.61%). In the federal election, a total of 650 votes were cast, and the voter turnout was 51.3%.

== Economy ==
As of 2007, Itingen had an unemployment rate of 3.57%. As of 2005, there were 8 people employed in the primary economic sector and about 2 businesses involved in this sector. 445 people were employed in the secondary sector and there were 22 businesses in this sector. 820 people were employed in the tertiary sector, with 44 businesses in this sector. There were 916 residents of the municipality who were employed in some capacity, of which females made up 45.5% of the workforce.

In 2008 the total number of full-time equivalent jobs was 1,131. The number of jobs in the primary sector was 3, of which 2 were in agriculture and 1 was in forestry or lumber production. The number of jobs in the secondary sector was 384, of which 352 or (91.7%) were in manufacturing and 32 (8.3%) were in construction. The number of jobs in the tertiary sector was 744. In the tertiary sector; 47 or 6.3% were in wholesale or retail sales or the repair of motor vehicles, 158 or 21.2% were in the movement and storage of goods, 16 or 2.2% were in a hotel or restaurant, 8 or 1.1% were in the information industry, 480 or 64.5% were technical professionals or scientists, 14 or 1.9% were in education and 9 or 1.2% were in health care.

In 2000, there were 971 workers who commuted into the municipality and 709 workers who commuted away. The municipality is a net importer of workers, with about 1.4 workers entering the municipality for every one leaving. About 1.4% of the workforce coming into Itingen are coming from outside Switzerland. Of the working population, 23.6% used public transportation to get to work, and 50.5% used a private car.

== Religion ==
From the 2000 census, 404 or 25.0% were Roman Catholic, while 889 or 54.9% belonged to the Swiss Reformed Church. Of the rest of the population, there were 15 members of an Orthodox church (or about 0.93% of the population), there were 4 individuals (or about 0.25% of the population) who belonged to the Christian Catholic Church, and there were 22 individuals (or about 1.36% of the population) who belonged to another Christian church. There were 3 individuals (or about 0.19% of the population) who were Jewish, and 80 (or about 4.94% of the population) who were Islamic. There were 2 individuals who were Buddhist and 1 individual who belonged to another church. 181 (or about 11.19% of the population) belonged to no church, are agnostic or atheist, and 17 individuals (or about 1.05% of the population) did not answer the question.

== Transport ==
Itingen sits on the Hauenstein line and is served by trains at Itingen railway station.

== Education ==
In Itingen about 741 or (45.8%) of the population have completed non-mandatory upper secondary education, and 215 or (13.3%) have completed additional higher education (either university or a Fachhochschule). Of the 215 who completed tertiary schooling, 56.7% were Swiss men, 29.3% were Swiss women, 10.7% were non-Swiss men and 3.3% were non-Swiss women.

As of 2000, there were 6 students in Itingen who came from another municipality, while 147 residents attended schools outside the municipality.
