= Nuglar-St. Pantaleon =

- Municipality
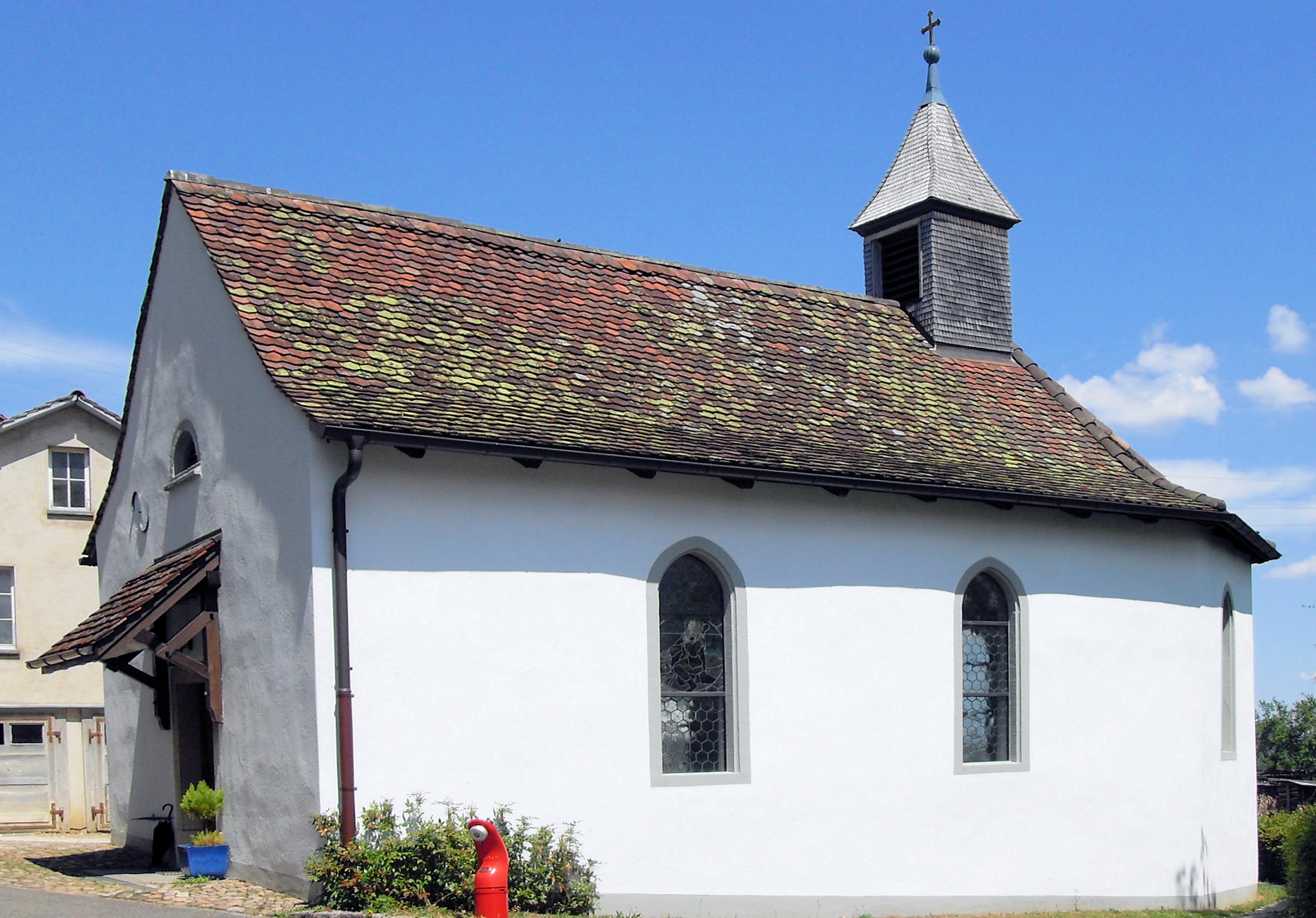

- Coat of arms
- Location of Nuglar-St. Pantaleon
- Location within Switzerland Location within Canton of Solothurn
- Coordinates: 47°28′N 7°42′E
- Country: Switzerland
- Canton: Solothurn
- District: Dorneck

Area
  - Total: 6.34 km^{2} (2.45 sq mi)
- Elevation: 488 m (1,601 ft)

Population (December 2020)
  - Total: 1,516
  - Density: 239/km^{2} (619/sq mi)
- Time zone: UTC+01:00 (CET)
  - Summer (DST): UTC+02:00 (CEST)
- Postal code: 4412
- SFOS number: 2478
- ISO 3166 code: CH-SO
- Surrounded by: Büren, Frenkendorf (BL), Gempen, Liestal (BL), Lupsingen (BL), Seltisberg (BL)
- Twin towns: Szomolya (Hungary)
- Website: www.nuglar.ch

Nuglar-St. Pantaleon (Swiss German: Nugle-Bäntlion) is a municipality in the district of Dorneck in the canton of Solothurn in Switzerland.

== History ==
Nuglar is first mentioned in 1147 as Nugerolo. St. Pantaleon was mentioned in 1284-85 ad Sanctum Pantaleonem.

== Geography ==
Aerial view (1948)

Nuglar-St. Pantaleon has an area, as of 2009, of 6.34 square kilometers (2.45 sq mi). Of this area, 2.9 km^{2} (1.1 sq mi) or 45.7% is used for agricultural purposes, while 2.68 km^{2} (1.03 sq mi) or 42.3% is forested. Of the rest of the land, 0.72 km^{2} (0.28 sq mi) or 11.4% is settled (buildings or roads), 0.01 km^{2} (2.5 acres) or 0.2% is either rivers or lakes and 0.02 km^{2} (4.9 acres) or 0.3% is unproductive land.

Of the built up area, housing and buildings made up 6.8% and transportation infrastructure made up 3.6%. Out of the forested land, 38.5% of the total land area is heavily forested and 3.8% is covered with orchards or small clusters of trees. Of the agricultural land, 9.5% is used for growing crops and 22.9% is pastures, while 13.4% is used for orchards or vine crops. All the water in the municipality is flowing water.

The municipality is located in the Dorneck district, on the eastern side of the Gempen plateau. It consists of the villages of Nuglar and St. Pantaleona.

== Coat of arms ==
The blazon of the municipal coat of arms is Argent a Branch of a Cherry Tree proper in bend couped with three Cherries Gules slipped Vert and a leaf of the last.

== Demographics ==
Nuglar-St. Pantaleon has a population (as of December 2020) of 1,516. As of 2008, 8.0% of the population are resident foreign nationals. Over the last 10 years (1999–2009 ) the population has changed at a rate of 7.1%.

Most of the population (as of 2000) speaks German (1,265 or 96.3%), with Italian being second most common (9 or 0.7%) and English being third (9 or 0.7%). There are 7 people who speak French.

As of 2008, the gender distribution of the population was 47.6% male and 52.4% female. The population was made up of 632 Swiss men (43.3% of the population) and 62 (4.3%) non-Swiss men. There were 700 Swiss women (48.0%) and 64 (4.4%) non-Swiss women. Of the population in the municipality 515 or about 39.2% were born in Nuglar-St. Pantaleon and lived there in 2000. There were 77 or 5.9% who were born in the same canton, while 554 or 42.2% were born somewhere else in Switzerland, and 122 or 9.3% were born outside of Switzerland.

In 2008 there were 11 live births to Swiss citizens and were 8 deaths of Swiss citizens. Ignoring immigration and emigration, the population of Swiss citizens increased by 3 while the foreign population remained the same. There was 1 Swiss man and 2 Swiss women who immigrated back to Switzerland. At the same time, there was 1 non-Swiss woman who emigrated from Switzerland to another country. The total Swiss population change in 2008 (from all sources, including moves across municipal borders) was an increase of 27 and the non-Swiss population increased by 9 people. This represents a population growth rate of 2.6%.

The age distribution, as of 2000, in Nuglar-St. Pantaleon is; 123 children or 9.4% of the population are between 0 and 6 years old and 223 teenagers or 17.0% are between 7 and 19. Of the adult population, 54 people or 4.1% of the population are between 20 and 24 years old. 399 people or 30.4% are between 25 and 44, and 371 people or 28.2% are between 45 and 64. The senior population distribution is 113 people or 8.6% of the population are between 65 and 79 years old and there are 31 people or 2.4% who are over 80.

As of 2000, there were 539 people who were single and never married in the municipality. There were 641 married individuals, 68 widows or widowers and 66 individuals who are divorced.

As of 2000, there were 522 private households in the municipality, and an average of 2.5 persons per household. There were 135 households that consist of only one person and 44 households with five or more people. Out of a total of 527 households that answered this question, 25.6% were households made up of just one person and there were 8 adults who lived with their parents. Of the rest of the households, there are 157 married couples without children, 192 married couples with children There were 22 single parents with a child or children. There were 8 households that were made up of unrelated people and 5 households that were made up of some sort of institution or another collective housing.

In 2000 there were 363 single family homes (or 78.2% of the total) out of a total of 464 inhabited buildings. There were 44 multi-family buildings (9.5%), along with 45 multi-purpose buildings that were mostly used for housing (9.7%) and 12 other use buildings (commercial or industrial) that also had some housing (2.6%). Of the single family homes 46 were built before 1919, while 88 were built between 1990 and 2000. The greatest number of single family homes (71) were built between 1981 and 1990.

In 2000 there were 557 apartments in the municipality. The most common apartment size was 4 rooms of which there were 174. There were 9 single room apartments and 262 apartments with five or more rooms. Of these apartments, a total of 505 apartments (90.7% of the total) were permanently occupied, while 39 apartments (7.0%) were seasonally occupied and 13 apartments (2.3%) were empty. As of 2009, the construction rate of new housing units was 5.5 new units per 1000 residents. The vacancy rate for the municipality, in 2010, was 0.65%.

The historical population is given in the following chart:

== Politics ==
In the 2007 federal election the most popular party was the SVP which received 29.5% of the vote. The next three most popular parties were the FDP (19.15%), the SP (18.58%) and the CVP (15.52%). In the federal election, a total of 495 votes were cast, and the voter turnout was 48.6%.

== Economy ==
As of 2010, Nuglar-St. Pantaleon had an unemployment rate of 2%. As of 2008, there were 44 people employed in the primary economic sector and about 16 businesses involved in this sector. 43 people were employed in the secondary sector and there were 13 businesses in this sector. 73 people were employed in the tertiary sector, with 30 businesses in this sector. There were 706 residents of the municipality who were employed in some capacity, of which females made up 39.7% of the workforce.

In 2008 the total number of full-time equivalent jobs was 111. The number of jobs in the primary sector was 16, all of which were in agriculture. The number of jobs in the secondary sector was 37 of which 16 or (43.2%) were in manufacturing and 17 (45.9%) were in construction. The number of jobs in the tertiary sector was 58. In the tertiary sector; 11 or 19.0% were in wholesale or retail sales or the repair of motor vehicles, 5 or 8.6% were in the movement and storage of goods, 9 or 15.5% were in a hotel or restaurant, 2 or 3.4% were in the information industry, 12 or 20.7% were technical professionals or scientists, 8 or 13.8% were in education.

In 2000, there were 41 workers who commuted into the municipality and 588 workers who commuted away. The municipality is a net exporter of workers, with about 14.3 workers leaving the municipality for every one entering. Of the working population, 21.4% used public transportation to get to work, and 63.5% used a private car.

== Religion ==
From the 2000 census, 719 or 54.7% were Roman Catholic, while 310 or 23.6% belonged to the Swiss Reformed Church. Of the rest of the population, there were 6 members of an Orthodox church (or about 0.46% of the population), there was 1 individual who belongs to the Christian Catholic Church, and there were 32 individuals (or about 2.44% of the population) who belonged to another Christian church. There were 6 (or about 0.46% of the population) who were Islamic. There were 6 individuals who were Buddhist, 5 individuals who were Hindu and 1 individual who belonged to another church. 189 (or about 14.38% of the population) belonged to no church, are agnostic or atheist, and 39 individuals (or about 2.97% of the population) did not answer the question.

== Education ==
In Nuglar-St. Pantaleon about 554 or (42.2%) of the population have completed non-mandatory upper secondary education, and 166 or (12.6%) have completed additional higher education (either university or a Fachhochschule). Of the 166 who completed tertiary schooling, 63.9% were Swiss men, 21.1% were Swiss women, 8.4% were non-Swiss men and 6.6% were non-Swiss women.

During the 2010-2011 school year there were a total of 127 students in the Nuglar-St. Pantaleon school system. The education system in the Canton of Solothurn allows young children to attend two years of non-obligatory Kindergarten. During that school year, there were 29 children in kindergarten. The canton's school system requires students to attend six years of primary school, with some of the children attending smaller, specialized classes. In the municipality there were 98 students in primary school. The secondary school program consists of three lower, obligatory years of schooling, followed by three to five years of optional, advanced schools. All the lower secondary students from Nuglar-St. Pantaleon attend their school in a neighboring municipality.

As of 2000, there were 93 students from Nuglar-St. Pantaleon who attended schools outside the municipality.

== Notable residents ==
Lorenz Saladin (1896-1936), mountaineer and photographer, was born here.
