= Ziefen =

- Municipality
- Flag Coat of arms
- Location of Ziefen
- Location within Switzerland Location within Canton of Basel-Landschaft
- Coordinates: 47°26′N 7°42′E
- Country: Switzerland
- Canton: Basel-Landschaft
- District: Liestal

Area
  - Total: 7.80 km^{2} (3.01 sq mi)
- Elevation: 423 m (1,388 ft)

Population (June 2021)
  - Total: 1,631
  - Density: 209/km^{2} (542/sq mi)
- Time zone: UTC+01:00 (CET)
  - Summer (DST): UTC+02:00 (CEST)
- Postal code: 4417
- SFOS number: 2834
- ISO 3166 code: CH-BL
- Surrounded by: Arboldswil, Bubendorf, Büren (SO), Lupsingen, Reigoldswil, Seewen (SO)
- Website: ziefen.ch

Ziefen is a municipality in the district of Liestal in the canton of Basel-Country in Switzerland.

== Geography ==
Aerial view (1949)

Ziefen has an area, as of 2009, of 7.8 square kilometers (3.0 sq mi). Of this area, 3.31 km^{2} (1.28 sq mi) or 42.4% is used for agricultural purposes, while 3.81 km^{2} (1.47 sq mi) or 48.8% is forested. Of the rest of the land, 0.66 km^{2} (0.25 sq mi) or 8.5% is settled (buildings or roads), 0.03 km^{2} (7.4 acres) or 0.4% is either rivers or lakes.

Of the built up area, housing and buildings made up 5.1% and transportation infrastructure made up 2.4%. Out of the forested land, 47.1% of the total land area is heavily forested and 1.8% is covered with orchards or small clusters of trees. Of the agricultural land, 11.5% is used for growing crops and 26.9% is pastures, while 4.0% is used for orchards or vine crops. All the water in the municipality is flowing water.

== Coat of arms ==
The blazon of the municipal coat of arms is Argent, an Eagle displayed Sable fesswise, langued, beaked and membered Or.

== Demographics ==
Ziefen has a population (as of June 2021) of 1,631. As of 2008, 7.6% of the population are resident foreign nationals. Over the last 10 years (1997–2007) the population has changed at a rate of 12.8%.

Most of the population (as of 2000) speaks German (1,269 or 94.1%), with Albanian being second most common (23 or 1.7%) and French being third (15 or 1.1%).

As of 2008, the gender distribution of the population was 50.1% male and 49.9% female. The population was made up of 1,416 Swiss citizens (91.7% of the population), and 128 non-Swiss residents (8.3%) Of the population in the municipality 491 or about 36.4% were born in Ziefen and lived there in 2000. There were 364 or 27.0% who were born in the same canton, while 327 or 24.2% were born somewhere else in Switzerland, and 131 or 9.7% were born outside of Switzerland.

In 2008 there were 12 live births to Swiss citizens and 1 birth to non-Swiss citizens, and in same time span there were 10 deaths of Swiss citizens. Ignoring immigration and emigration, the population of Swiss citizens increased by 2 while the foreign population increased by 1. There were 2 Swiss men who emigrated from Switzerland. At the same time, there were 3 non-Swiss men and 1 non-Swiss woman who immigrated from another country to Switzerland. The total Swiss population change in 2008 (from all sources, including moves across municipal borders) was an increase of 28 and the non-Swiss population increased by 9 people. This represents a population growth rate of 2.4%.

The age distribution, as of 2010, in Ziefen is; 122 children or 7.9% of the population are between 0 and 6 years old and 293 teenagers or 19.0% are between 7 and 19. Of the adult population, 163 people or 10.6% of the population are between 20 and 29 years old. 174 people or 11.3% are between 30 and 39, 276 people or 17.9% are between 40 and 49, and 278 people or 18.0% are between 50 and 64. The senior population distribution is 154 people or 10.0% of the population are between 65 and 79 years old and there are 84 people or 5.4% who are over 80.

As of 2000, there were 566 people who were single and never married in the municipality. There were 680 married individuals, 64 widows or widowers and 39 individuals who are divorced.

As of 2000, there were 491 private households in the municipality, and an average of 2.7 persons per household. There were 102 households that consist of only one person and 52 households with five or more people. Out of a total of 499 households that answered this question, 20.4% were households made up of just one person and 6 were adults who lived with their parents. Of the rest of the households, there are 153 married couples without children, 201 married couples with children There were 21 single parents with a child or children. There were 8 households that were made up unrelated people and 8 households that were made some sort of institution or another collective housing.

In 2000 there were 266 single family homes (or 66.8% of the total) out of a total of 398 inhabited buildings. There were 56 multi-family buildings (14.1%), along with 64 multi-purpose buildings that were mostly used for housing (16.1%) and 12 other use buildings (commercial or industrial) that also had some housing (3.0%). Of the single family homes 55 were built before 1919, while 63 were built between 1990 and 2000.

In 2000 there were 525 apartments in the municipality. The most common apartment size was 5 rooms of which there were 152. There were 9 single room apartments and 266 apartments with five or more rooms. Of these apartments, a total of 479 apartments (91.2% of the total) were permanently occupied, while 29 apartments (5.5%) were seasonally occupied and 17 apartments (3.2%) were empty. As of 2007, the construction rate of new housing units was 11.9 new units per 1000 residents. As of 2000 the average price to rent a two-room apartment was about 718.00 CHF (US$570, £320, €460), a three-room apartment was about 932.00 CHF (US$750, £420, €600) and a four-room apartment cost an average of 1255.00 CHF (US$1000, £560, €800). The vacancy rate for the municipality, in 2008, was 0.68%.

The historical population is given in the following chart:

== Heritage sites of national significance ==
The House with Heimposamenterei is listed as a Swiss heritage site of national significance. The entire village of Ziefen is part of the Inventory of Swiss Heritage Sites.

== Politics ==
In the 2007 federal election the most popular party was the SVP which received 28.85% of the vote. The next three most popular parties were the SP (22.53%), the Green Party (22.41%) and the FDP (11.5%). In the federal election, a total of 562 votes were cast, and the voter turnout was 54.0%.

== Economy ==
As of 2007, Ziefen had an unemployment rate of 2.02%. As of 2005, there were 53 people employed in the primary economic sector and about 19 businesses involved in this sector. 250 people were employed in the secondary sector and there were 20 businesses in this sector. 128 people were employed in the tertiary sector, with 35 businesses in this sector. There were 663 residents of the municipality who were employed in some capacity, of which females made up 41.9% of the workforce.

In 2008 the total number of full-time equivalent jobs was 354. The number of jobs in the primary sector was 28, all of which were in agriculture. The number of jobs in the secondary sector was 239, of which 158 or (66.1%) were in manufacturing and 51 (21.3%) were in construction. The number of jobs in the tertiary sector was 87. In the tertiary sector; 26 or 29.9% were in wholesale or retail sales or the repair of motor vehicles, 2 or 2.3% were in a hotel or restaurant, 2 or 2.3% were in the information industry, 14 or 16.1% were technical professionals or scientists, 11 or 12.6% were in education and 4 or 4.6% were in health care.

In 2000, there were 265 workers who commuted into the municipality and 463 workers who commuted away. The municipality is a net exporter of workers, with about 1.7 workers leaving the municipality for every one entering. About 9.1% of the workforce coming into Ziefen are coming from outside Switzerland. Of the working population, 24.7% used public transportation to get to work, and 41.6% used a private car.

== Religion ==
From the 2000 census, 185 or 13.7% were Roman Catholic, while 840 or 62.3% belonged to the Swiss Reformed Church. Of the rest of the population, there were 9 members of an Orthodox church (or about 0.67% of the population), there were 2 individuals (or about 0.15% of the population) who belonged to the Christian Catholic Church, and there were 94 individuals (or about 6.97% of the population) who belonged to another Christian church. There were 34 (or about 2.52% of the population) who were Islamic. There was 1 person who was Buddhist. 140 (or about 10.38% of the population) belonged to no church, are agnostic or atheist, and 44 individuals (or about 3.26% of the population) did not answer the question.

== Education ==
In Ziefen about 507 or (37.6%) of the population have completed non-mandatory upper secondary education, and 173 or (12.8%) have completed additional higher education (either university or a Fachhochschule). Of the 173 who completed tertiary schooling, 69.9% were Swiss men, 21.4% were Swiss women, 5.8% were non-Swiss men and 2.9% were non-Swiss women.

As of 2000, there were 25 students in Ziefen who came from another municipality, while 141 residents attended schools outside the municipality.
