= List of cultural property of national significance in Switzerland: Basel-Landschaft =

This list contains all cultural property of national significance (class A) in the canton of Basel-Landschaft from the 2009 Swiss Inventory of Cultural Property of National and Regional Significance. It is sorted by municipality and contains 36 individual buildings, 6 collections and 22 archaeological finds.

The geographic coordinates provided are in the Swiss coordinate system as given in the Inventory.

== Aesch ==
KGS No.^{?}	Picture	Name	Street Address	CH1903 X coordinate	CH1903 Y coordinate	Location
1371	Gmeiniwald (Neolithic Dolmen Grave)	Gmeiniwald (Neolithic Dolmen Grave)		609.830	257.520	47.468381°N 7.56902°E
9014	School Complex of Neumatt	School Complex of Neumatt	Sekandarschulhaus	611.715	258.024	47.472883°N 7.594035°E

== Allschwil ==
KGS No.^{?}	Picture	Name	Street Address	CH1903 X coordinate	CH1903 Y coordinate	Location
Unknown		ISOS Village: Allschwil				

== Anwil ==
KGS No.^{?}	Picture	Name	Street Address	CH1903 X coordinate	CH1903 Y coordinate	Location
Unknown		ISOS Village: Anwil				

== Arisdorf ==
KGS No.^{?}	Picture	Name	Street Address	CH1903 X coordinate	CH1903 Y coordinate	Location
Unknown		ISOS Village: Arisdorf				

== Arlesheim ==
KGS No.^{?}	Picture	Name	Street Address	CH1903 X coordinate	CH1903 Y coordinate	Location
1386	Andlauerhof	Andlauerhof	Andlauerweg 15	613.885	260.326	47.493545°N 7.622891°E
1385	Domherrenhaus	Domherrenhaus	Domstrasse 2	613.547	260.265	47.493003°N 7.618404°E
1388	Domherrenhäuser am Domplatz	Domherrenhäuser am Domplatz	Domplatz 5 –12	613.697	260.159	47.492047°N 7.620391°E
1383	Domkirche (Cathedral Church)	Domkirche (Cathedral Church)	Domplatz 16	613.730	260.160	47.492055°N 7.620829°E
1384; 9565	Hermitage with ruins of Birseck Castle as well as Paleolithic Cave Dwellings, an early Cult site and Neolithic graves	Hermitage with ruins of Birseck Castle as well as Paleolithic Cave Dwellings, an early Cult site and Neolithic graves		614.210	260.100	47.491505°N 7.627197°E
9927	Reichenstein Castle	Reichenstein Castle		614.345	260.685	47.496764°N 7.629007°E
Unknown		ISOS Village: Arlesheim				

== Augst ==
KGS No.^{?}	Picture	Name	Street Address	CH1903 X coordinate	CH1903 Y coordinate	Location
1391; 8469	Augusta Raurica (Roman City and Museum)	Augusta Raurica (Roman City and Museum)		621.317	264.849	47.534025°N 7.721729°E
1393	Villa Clavel auf Castelen	Villa Clavel auf Castelen	Giebenacherstrasse 9	621.280	264.900	47.534485°N 7.72124°E
Unknown		ISOS Spezialfall: Augst with Augusta Raurica				

== Bennwil ==
KGS No.^{?}	Picture	Name	Street Address	CH1903 X coordinate	CH1903 Y coordinate	Location
9566		Ötschberg (a Neolithic Settlement)		625.050	251.300	47.412035°N 7.770543°E
Unknown		ISOS Village: Bennwil				

== Birsfelden ==
KGS No.^{?}	Picture	Name	Street Address	CH1903 X coordinate	CH1903 Y coordinate	Location
1401	Powerplant Birsfelden	Powerplant Birsfelden	Hofstrasse 80	614.131	267.684	47.559716°N 7.626389°E
9730	Catholic Church of Bruder Klaus	Catholic Church of Bruder Klaus	Hardstrasse 28	614.089	266.785	47.551632°N 7.625802°E
11656		Sternenfeld (Part of the Roman era Rhine fortifications)		615.100	267.350	47.556691°N 7.639252°E

== Bottmingen ==
KGS No.^{?}	Picture	Name	Street Address	CH1903 X coordinate	CH1903 Y coordinate	Location
1403	Weiherschloss (Bottmingen Castle)	Weiherschloss (Bottmingen Castle)	Castlegasse 9	609.908	263.671	47.523701°N 7.570191°E

== Brislach ==
KGS No.^{?}	Picture	Name	Street Address	CH1903 X coordinate	CH1903 Y coordinate	Location
1406		Kohlerhöhle (Paleolithic Cave Dwelling)		609.780	253.480	47.432046°N 7.568268°E

== Bubendorf ==
KGS No.^{?}	Picture	Name	Street Address	CH1903 X coordinate	CH1903 Y coordinate	Location
1408	Wildenstein Castle	Wildenstein Castle		622.422	253.303	47.430145°N 7.735823°E

== Burg im Leimental ==
KGS No.^{?}	Picture	Name	Street Address	CH1903 X coordinate	CH1903 Y coordinate	Location
1415	Burg Castle with Chapel	Burg Castle with Chapel		600.150	256.220	47.456762°N 7.440626°E
Unknown		ISOS Village: Burg im Leimental				

== Buus ==
KGS No.^{?}	Picture	Name	Street Address	CH1903 X coordinate	CH1903 Y coordinate	Location
1418	Ständerhaus	Ständerhaus	Rickenbacherstrasse 16	632.092	261.596	47.504331°N 7.864586°E
Unknown		ISOS Village: Buus				

== Duggingen ==
KGS No.^{?}	Picture	Name	Street Address	CH1903 X coordinate	CH1903 Y coordinate	Location
1420	Angenstein Castle	Angenstein Castle	Angenstein 1	612.534	256.960	47.463298°N 7.604869°E
Unknown		ISOS Spezialfall: Angenstein				

== Gelterkinden ==
KGS No.^{?}	Picture	Name	Street Address	CH1903 X coordinate	CH1903 Y coordinate	Location
Unknown		ISOS Village: Gelterkinden				

== Itingen ==
KGS No.^{?}	Picture	Name	Street Address	CH1903 X coordinate	CH1903 Y coordinate	Location
Unknown		ISOS Village: Itingen				

== Kilchberg ==
KGS No.^{?}	Picture	Name	Street Address	CH1903 X coordinate	CH1903 Y coordinate	Location
1440	Evangelisch-Reformed Church	Evangelisch-Reformed Church		634.715	252.885	47.425852°N 7.898722°E
Unknown		ISOS Village: Kilchberg (BL)				

== Lampenberg ==
KGS No.^{?}	Picture	Name	Street Address	CH1903 X coordinate	CH1903 Y coordinate	Location
9567		Stälzer (Neolithic Flint Tool Production Site		623.100	252.900	47.426497°N 7.744789°E

== Langenbruck ==
KGS No.^{?}	Picture	Name	Street Address	CH1903 X coordinate	CH1903 Y coordinate	Location
9568		Dürsteltal (Medieval Mine)		626.000	244.800	47.353536°N 7.782753°E
Unknown		ISOS Spezialfall: Schöntal				

== Läufelfingen ==
KGS No.^{?}	Picture	Name	Street Address	CH1903 X coordinate	CH1903 Y coordinate	Location
1443	Ruins of Neu-Homburg Castle	Ruins of Neu-Homburg Castle		631.430	250.320	47.402947°N 7.855006°E

== Laufen ==
KGS No.^{?}	Picture	Name	Street Address	CH1903 X coordinate	CH1903 Y coordinate	Location
1447	Christian-Catholic Church of St Katharina	Christian-Catholic Church of St Katharina	Amtshausgasse	604.645	252.471	47.423027°N 7.500195°E
Unknown	ISOS Kleinstadt / Flecken: Laufen	ISOS Kleinstadt / Flecken: Laufen				

== Lausen ==
KGS No.^{?}	Picture	Name	Street Address	CH1903 X coordinate	CH1903 Y coordinate	Location
1451	Bettenach (Roman era through High Middle Ages Settlement)	Bettenach (Roman era through High Middle Ages Settlement)		624.070	258.500	47.476828°N 7.757946°E
Unknown		ISOS Spezialfall: Lausen				

== Liesberg ==
KGS No.^{?}	Picture	Name	Street Address	CH1903 X coordinate	CH1903 Y coordinate	Location
Unknown		ISOS Spezialfall: Liesbergmüli				

== Liestal ==
KGS No.^{?}	Picture	Name	Street Address	CH1903 X coordinate	CH1903 Y coordinate	Location
Unknown		Depot der Archäologie Baselland	Frenkendörferstrasse 15 a			
9071	Frenkenbrücke der SCB	Frenkenbrücke der SCB	Frenkenstrasse	622.943	258.608	47.47784°N 7.743001°E
1464	Munzach (Roman Farmhouse)	Munzach (Roman Farmhouse)		621.220	259.800	47.488618°N 7.720201°E
9569		Roman Aqueduct		623.650	258.600	47.477743°N 7.75238°E
8781	Cantonal Archive of Basel-Landschaft	Cantonal Archive of Basel-Landschaft	Wiedenhuberstrasse 35	621.694	259.631	47.487083°N 7.726482°E
Unknown		ISOS Kleinstadt / Flecken: Liestal				

== Maisprach ==
KGS No.^{?}	Picture	Name	Street Address	CH1903 X coordinate	CH1903 Y coordinate	Location
1473		Mill	Unterdorf 16	630.770	263.651	47.522876°N 7.847182°E
Unknown		ISOS Village: Maisprach				

== Münchenstein ==
KGS No.^{?}	Picture	Name	Street Address	CH1903 X coordinate	CH1903 Y coordinate	Location
Unknown	Bruckgut	Bruckgut	Hauptstrasse 1	613.637	263.024	47.517816°N 7.619683°E
8501		Foundation Herzog	Oslo-Strasse 8	612.884	264.752	47.533372°N 7.609736°E
9033	Gartenbad St Jakob	Gartenbad St Jakob	Grosse Allee 1 a – h	613.704	265.482	47.539921°N 7.620648°E
8620	Kutschenmuseum (Carriage Museum)	Kutschenmuseum (Carriage Museum)	Vorder Brüglingen 4	613.252	265.168	47.537106°N 7.614635°E
8594	Schaulager	Schaulager	Ruchfeldstrasse 19	612.951	264.205	47.528451°N 7.61061°E
Unknown	Villa Merian (Business and Park)	Villa Merian (Business and Park)	Unter Brüglingen 1 – 4	613.160	264.946	47.535111°N 7.613407°E
Unknown		ISOS Spezialfall: Brüglingen				

== Muttenz ==
KGS No.^{?}	Picture	Name	Street Address	CH1903 X coordinate	CH1903 Y coordinate	Location
11676	Au-Hard (Part of the late-Roman era Rhine fortifications)	Au-Hard (Part of the late-Roman era Rhine fortifications)		616.540	265.480	47.539838°N 7.658314°E
1483	Genossenschaftssiedlung Freidorf	Genossenschaftssiedlung Freidorf	St Jakobsstrasse	614.300	265.150	47.536922°N 7.628553°E
1485	Rangierbahnhof (Train Station)	Rangierbahnhof (Train Station)	Hauptdienstgebäude	615.727	264.846	47.534156°N 7.647494°E
1484	Reformed Parish Fortified Church of St. Arbogast	Reformed Parish Fortified Church of St. Arbogast	Kirchplatz 1	615.583	263.528	47.522305°N 7.645535°E
Unknown		ISOS Village: Muttenz				
Unknown		ISOS Spezialfall: Siedlung Freidorf				

== Nenzlingen ==
KGS No.^{?}	Picture	Name	Street Address	CH1903 X coordinate	CH1903 Y coordinate	Location
9570		Birsmatten-Basisgrotte (Mesolithic Settlement with Burial Sites)		608.390	254.880	47.444657°N 7.54987°E

== Oltingen ==
KGS No.^{?}	Picture	Name	Street Address	CH1903 X coordinate	CH1903 Y coordinate	Location
1494	Reformed Parish Church of St Niklaus	Reformed Parish Church of St Niklaus	Herrengasse 39	637.361	253.705	47.433082°N 7.933858°E
9528		House (known as Grosses Haus)	Hauptstrasse 54	637.486	253.597	47.432104°N 7.935506°E
Unknown		ISOS Village: Oltingen				

== Ormalingen ==
KGS No.^{?}	Picture	Name	Street Address	CH1903 X coordinate	CH1903 Y coordinate	Location
1495	Ruins of Farnsburg Castle	Ruins of Farnsburg Castle		632.550	260.360	47.493192°N 7.870574°E

== Pfeffingen ==
KGS No.^{?}	Picture	Name	Street Address	CH1903 X coordinate	CH1903 Y coordinate	Location
1499	Castle Ruins (Pfeffingen, Engenstein, Münchsberg and Schalberg)	Castle Ruins (Pfeffingen, Engenstein, Münchsberg and Schalberg)		611.560	255.850	47.453333°N 7.591922°E

== Pratteln ==
KGS No.^{?}	Picture	Name	Street Address	CH1903 X coordinate	CH1903 Y coordinate	Location
Unknown		ISOS Village: Pratteln				

== Reigoldswil ==
KGS No.^{?}	Picture	Name	Street Address	CH1903 X coordinate	CH1903 Y coordinate	Location
9140		House Preiswerk	Gorisen 231 A	618.955	251.025	47.409765°N 7.689775°E

== Rothenfluh ==
KGS No.^{?}	Picture	Name	Street Address	CH1903 X coordinate	CH1903 Y coordinate	Location
Unknown		ISOS Village: Rothenfluh				

== Rümlingen ==
KGS No.^{?}	Picture	Name	Street Address	CH1903 X coordinate	CH1903 Y coordinate	Location
1520	Eisenbahnviadukt (Railroad Bridge)	Eisenbahnviadukt (Railroad Bridge)		631.070	252.680	47.42419°N 7.850401°E
Unknown		ISOS Village: Rümlingen				

== Sissach ==
KGS No.^{?}	Picture	Name	Street Address	CH1903 X coordinate	CH1903 Y coordinate	Location
1525	Bischofstein (Prehistoric Hilltop Settlement / Medieval Castle)	Bischofstein (Prehistoric Hilltop Settlement / Medieval Castle)		629.280	258.280	47.474638°N 7.827046°E
9591		Burgenrain (Prehistoric Hilltop Settlement)		628.620	256.420	47.457939°N 7.818172°E
1523	Landsitz Ebenrain	Landsitz Ebenrain	Itingerstrasse 13 – 17	627.621	257.102	47.464115°N 7.804966°E
1524	Reformed Parish Church of St Jakob	Reformed Parish Church of St Jakob	Schulstrasse 8	627.981	257.287	47.465764°N 7.809752°E
1529	Sissacherfluh (Prehistoric Hilltop Settlement / Medieval Fortification)	Sissacherfluh (Prehistoric Hilltop Settlement / Medieval Fortification)		628.600	258.920	47.480424°N 7.818067°E
Unknown		ISOS Verstädtertes Village: Sissach				

== Waldenburg ==
KGS No.^{?}	Picture	Name	Street Address	CH1903 X coordinate	CH1903 Y coordinate	Location
1535		Gerstelfluh (Prehistoric Hill Settlement / Medieval Government Center)		624.600	247.760	47.380213°N 7.764386°E
9130		Villa Gedeon Thommen with Park	Wilweg 8	623.337	248.411	47.386114°N 7.747696°E
Unknown	ISOS Kleinstadt / Flecken: Waldenburg	ISOS Kleinstadt / Flecken: Waldenburg				

== Wenslingen ==
KGS No.^{?}	Picture	Name	Street Address	CH1903 X coordinate	CH1903 Y coordinate	Location
Unknown		ISOS Village: Wenslingen				

== Wintersingen ==
KGS No.^{?}	Picture	Name	Street Address	CH1903 X coordinate	CH1903 Y coordinate	Location
Unknown		ISOS Village: Wintersingen				

== Ziefen ==
KGS No.^{?}	Picture	Name	Street Address	CH1903 X coordinate	CH1903 Y coordinate	Location
9763		House with Heimposamenterei	Dorf	620.354	253.327	47.430428°N 7.708415°E
Unknown		ISOS Village: Ziefen				

== Zwingen ==
KGS No.^{?}	Picture	Name	Street Address	CH1903 X coordinate	CH1903 Y coordinate	Location
Unknown		ISOS Village: Zwingen				

== Zunzgen ==
KGS No.^{?}	Picture	Name	Street Address	CH1903 X coordinate	CH1903 Y coordinate	Location
1545	Zunzger Büchel Prehistoric Fortified Hill	Zunzger Büchel; Prehistoric Fortified Hill		627.790	255.170	47.446732°N 7.807087°E
