= House of Homberg =

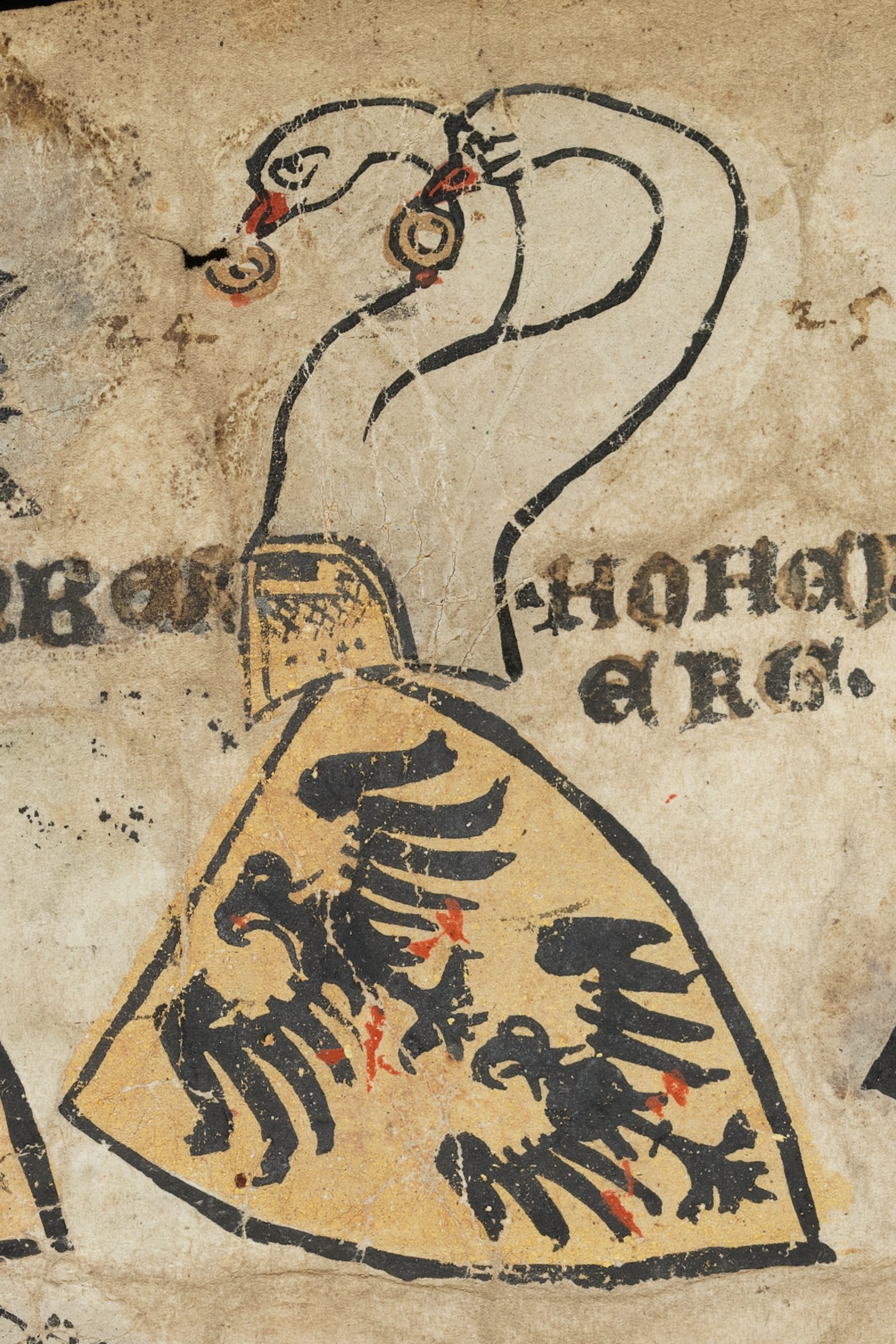
The Homberg coat of arms as shown in the Zürich armorial (c. 1340)

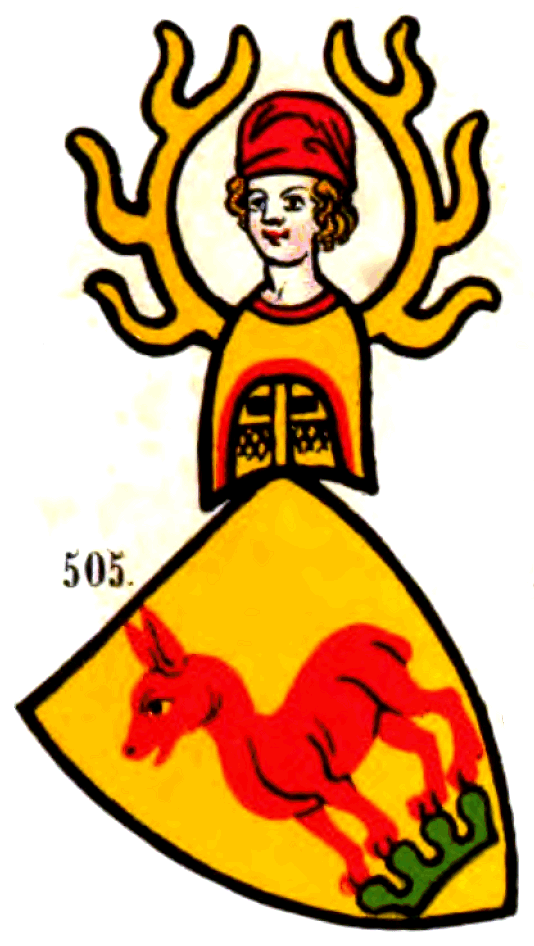
The Thierstein coat of arms as shown in the Zürich armorial

The House of Homberg (also spelled Honberg, historically Hochinberc, Hochenberg; also Thierstein, Tierstein) was a noble family of medieval Switzerland; they had the title of count from late 11th to early 16th century. They ruled over much of what is now northwestern Switzerland, including parts of the cantons of Aargau, Bern, Solothurn and Basel-Landschaft.

The first count of Thierstein (alternatively, of Homberg) was Rudolf de Dierstein, mentioned 1082. The two names are taken from two castles in Rudolf's possession, both located near Frick, Aargau. The Thierstein and Homberg lines separated in 1149. The Homberg line was extinct in 1223 with the death of Werner III and their territories were acquired by marriage Hermann IV of the House of Frohburg, whose line is also known as Frohburg-Homberg. Hermann's son Friedrich took the title of count of Homberg and built the castle Neu-Homberg in what is now part of the canton of Basel-Country. One of Friedrich's sons was Wernher von Homberg, one of the minnesingers featured in Codex Manesse.

The ancestral castles of Thierstein and Homberg were both destroyed in the earthquake of 1356, and the Thierstein branch of the family now renamed a castle of theirs near Büsserach (in what is now known as the Thierstein District of the canton of Solothurn) to Neu-Thierstein. In 1330, a branch of the Thierstein family, known as Thierstein-Farnsburg, built Farnsburg castle near Ormalingen. They were given Sisgau as a fief from the bishop of Basel. Count Oswald von Thierstein in 1479 received Hohkönigsburg in the Alsace as fief from emperor Frederick III. The Thierstein family was extinct in 1517, after which Hohkönigsburg fell back to the House of Habsburg.

== Counts of Thierstein and Homberg ==
=== House of Thierstein ===
Ruler	Born	Reign	Death	Ruling part	Consort	Notes
Rudolf I	?	c. 1020-1048	After 1 June 1048	County of Thierstein	Unknown at least one child	First documented count of the family, in Sisgau.
Rudolf II	?	c. 1048-1103	c. 1103	County of Thierstein	Unknown one or two children	Cited also as Advocatus in 1098.
Rudolf III	?	c. 1103-1114	aft. 7 March 1114	County of Thierstein	Ita of Habsburg three children	Cited as Count of Thierstein and Homberg. His sons divided his patrimony.
Werner I	?	c. 1114-1141/54	aft. 13 April 1141 or after 1154	Thierstein-Homberg	A lady Zollern four children	Son of Rudolf III, inherited the county of Homberg.
Rudolf IV	?	c. 1114-1144/7	aft. 8 July 1144 or c. 1147	County of Thierstein	Unknown at least one child	Son of Rudolf III, inherited the remaining Thierstein.
Rudolf V	?	c. 1144/7 – c. 1180?	before 1180	County of Thierstein	Bertha of Sogren four children	
Werner II	?	c. 1141/54-1185	aft. 1185	Thierstein-Homberg	Unknown two children	
Rudolf VI	?	c. 1179?-1238	c. 1238	County of Thierstein	Gepa three children	
Werner III	?	c. 1185 - 25 May 1223	25 May 1223	Thierstein-Homberg	Unknown no children	Last male member of the Homberg branch Through a sister or a daughter, who married Herman IV, Count of Frohburg. The land was inherited by the House of Frohburg.
Rudolf VII	?	c. 1238-1262	aft. 24 August 1262	County of Thierstein	Sophia four children	
Sigismund I	?	c. 1262 - 4 May 1326	4 May 1326	Thierstein-Farnsburg	Agnes of Weissenburg (d. after 1334) three children	Children of Rudolf VII, divided the land.
Rudolf VIII	?	c. 1262 - 27 August 1318	27 August 1318	Thierstein-Pfeffingen	Beatrix one child Elisabeth [Adelheid] of Hohenklingen (d. 16 January 1316/23) two children	Children of Rudolf VII, divided the land.
Ulrich I	?	27 August 1318 - c. 1330	before 29 June 1330	Thierstein-Pfeffingen	Unknown two children	
Otto I	?	4 May 1326 - c. 1350	c. 1350	Thierstein-Farnsburg	Clementina of Usenberg (d. after 1352) one child	
Walram I	?	1330-1345/56	2 October 1345/56	Thierstein-Pfeffingen	Agnes of Neuchâtel-Arberg; October 1320 two children	
Sigismund II	?	1347/52 - October 1383	October 1383	Thierstein-Farnsburg	Verena of Neuchâtel-Nidau (d. after 1384) four children	
Walram II	before 1339	1345/56 - 22 May 1403	22 May 1403	Thierstein-Pfeffingen	Anna of Fürstenberg or Adelheid of Hohenlohe four children Gisela Malterer (morganatic?) no children	
Walram III	before 1375	c. 1375 - 9 July 1386	9 July 1386; Battle of Sempach	Thierstein-Pfeffingen	Adelaide of Baden (d. 19 July 1370 or 31 December 1373) before 4 April 1369 four children	Possibly co-ruled with his father, as he predeceased him. (Some genealogists suggest that the death dates are reversed; in other words, his father died in the Battle of Sempach, and Walram III lived until 1403.)
Otto II	before 1375	1383-1418	1418	Thierstein-Farnsburg	Unmarried	Sons of Sigismund II, probably ruled jointly. After their deaths with no male descendants, this line became extinct.
Herman I	before 1375	1383 - 17 June 1405	17 June 1405	Thierstein-Farnsburg	Agnes of Mätsch (d. 1421) before 28 April 1393 one child	Sons of Sigismund II, probably ruled jointly. After their deaths with no male descendants, this line became extinct.
Sigismund III	before 1375	1383-1388	1388	Thierstein-Farnsburg	Unmarried	Sons of Sigismund II, probably ruled jointly. After their deaths with no male descendants, this line became extinct.
Bernard I	?	22 May 1403 - 13 December 1437	13 December 1437	Thierstein-Pfeffingen	Ita of Toggenburg (d. before 20 June 1414) two children Henriette of Salm-Blâmont c. 1417 one child	
John I	?	22 May 1403 or 13 December 1437 - 1455	1455	Thierstein-Pfeffingen	Unknown three children	Co-ruled with or succeeded his brother.
Oswald I	before 1439	1455 - March/September 1488	26 March or 6 September 1488	Thierstein-Pfeffingen	Ottilie of Nassau-Siegen before 13 January 1471 two children	
Henry	after 1439	March/September 1488 - 30 November 1519	30 November 1519	Thierstein-Pfeffingen	Margaret of Neufchâtel-Bourgogne (d. after 5 December 1533) two children	Sons of Oswald I, probably ruled jointly.
Oswald II	after 1439	March/September 1488 - 27 August 1512	27 August 1512	Thierstein-Pfeffingen	Elisabeth of Löwenstein (d. after 1510) two children	Sons of Oswald I, probably ruled jointly.

== See also ==
- House of Frohburg

== Bibliography ==
- * Birmann, Martin (1879). Die Genealogie der Grafen von Thierstein und Honberg. Basel. pp. 102–136.
- Hälg-Steffen, Franziska: Homberg, von in German, French and Italian in the online Historical Dictionary of Switzerland.
