= House of Frohburg =

Noble family

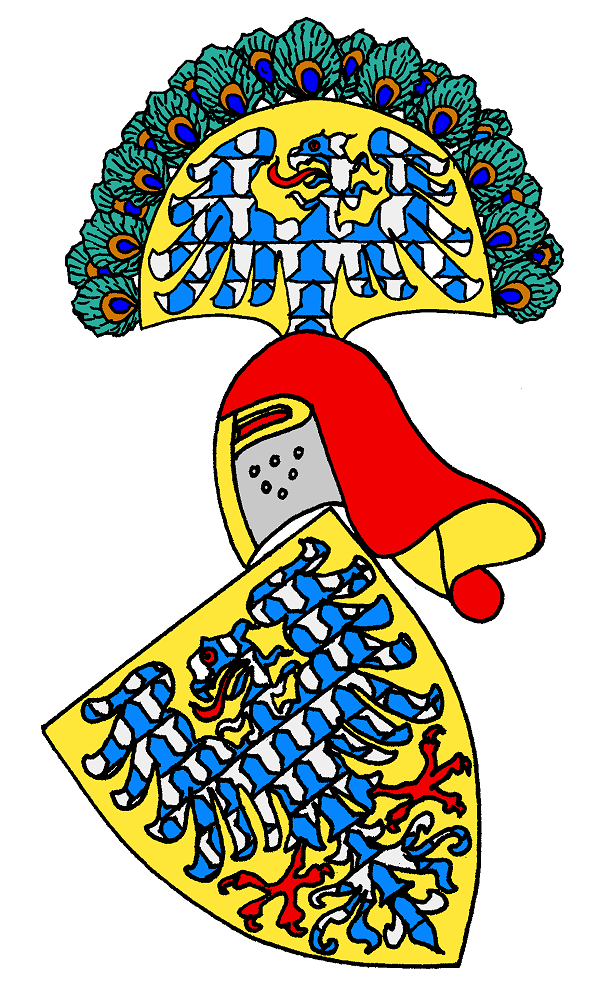
coat of arms

The House of Frohburg (also Froburg) was a noble family in medieval Switzerland, with possessions in what is now the canton of Solothurn. They originate in the Wigger basin, near Zofingen. In the 10th century, they built Frohburg Castle on a hill near Trimbach. They had the title of counts from the later 11th century. They ruled the lands between Olten and Solothurn, and took parts of Aargau and Sisgau as fief from the bishop of Basel. They reached the peak of their power in the later 12th and early 13th century, building a number of castles, and founding towns such as Aarburg, Liestal, Olten (then a fortified river crossing), Waldenburg, Wiedlisbach and Zofingen. They also founded Schöntal Abbey near Waldenburg. The House of Frohburg was divided into three branches, Neu-Homberg, Waldenburg and Zofingen, in c. 1250. The Zofingen branch was extinct in 1307, followed by the Neo-Homberg one in 1325. The Waldenburg branch survived for another 40 years but declined in influence, being forced to sell most of its possessions, most of them to the ascending House of Habsburg. The last count of Frohburg was Hermann VI (d. 1367 as abbot of St. Urban's Abbey).

== Counts of Frohburg ==
=== House of Frohburg ===
==== Partitions of Frohburg under House of Frohburg rule ====
County of Frohburg (1028-1213)
County of Zofingen (1213-1299)
County of Zofingen (1213-1299)	County of Waldenburg (1213-1367)	County of Homberg (1220-1303)
Annexed to the House of Habsburg	County of Waldenburg (1213-1367)	County of Homberg (1220-1303)
Annexed to the House of Habsburg	County of Waldenburg (1213-1367)	Annexed to the Bishopric of Basel
Annexed to the House of Habsburg	Annexed to the Bishopric of Basel and the County of Nidau	Annexed to the Bishopric of Basel

==== Table of rulers ====
Ruler	Born	Reign	Ruling part	Consort	Death	Notes
Adalbero (I)	c.1000 ?	c.1010 – 1050	County of Frohburg	Unknown at least two children	1050 aged 49-50	First documented count of the family, in Breisgau.
Wolfrad	c.1020 First son of Adalbero (I)	c.1050 – 1095	County of Frohburg	Unknown four children	c.1095 aged 74-75	Possible children of Adalbero, they may have ruled jointly. In 1114, another Volmar is mentioned, but is not identical with Volmar I. This new Volmar appears as co-ruler with Volmar I and his brother Louis. Louis' son, Ortlieb, would become Bishop of Basel.
Volmar I	c.1030 Second son of Adalbero (I)	c.1050 – 1114	County of Frohburg	Sophia of Pfirt two children	1114 aged 83-84?	Possible children of Adalbero, they may have ruled jointly. In 1114, another Volmar is mentioned, but is not identical with Volmar I. This new Volmar appears as co-ruler with Volmar I and his brother Louis. Louis' son, Ortlieb, would become Bishop of Basel.
Volmar (I)	c.1060 First son of Wolfrad	c.1095 – 1114	County of Frohburg	Unknown	c.1114 aged 53-54	Possible children of Adalbero, they may have ruled jointly. In 1114, another Volmar is mentioned, but is not identical with Volmar I. This new Volmar appears as co-ruler with Volmar I and his brother Louis. Louis' son, Ortlieb, would become Bishop of Basel.
Louis I	c.1060 Second son of Wolfrad	c.1095 – 1114	County of Frohburg	Unknown one child	c.1114? aged 53-54	Possible children of Adalbero, they may have ruled jointly. In 1114, another Volmar is mentioned, but is not identical with Volmar I. This new Volmar appears as co-ruler with Volmar I and his brother Louis. Louis' son, Ortlieb, would become Bishop of Basel.
Adalbero I	c.1100 First son of Volmar I and Sophia of Pfirt	1114 – 1152	County of Frohburg	Sophia of Lenzburg four children	c.1152 aged 51-52	Sons of Volmar I, ruled jointly.
Herman I	c.1100 Second son of Volmar I and Sophia of Pfirt	1114 – 1125	County of Frohburg	Unmarried	c.1125 aged 24-25	Sons of Volmar I, ruled jointly.
Volmar II	c.1120 First son of Adalbero I and Sophia of Lenzburg	1152 – 1175	County of Frohburg	Unknown four children	c.1175 aged 54-55	Sons of Adalbero I, possibly ruled jointly. Louis became Bishop of Basel in 1164.
Louis II Garewart	c.1120 Second son of Adalbero I and Sophia of Lenzburg	1152 – 1164	County of Frohburg	Unmarried	March 1179 aged 58-59	Sons of Adalbero I, possibly ruled jointly. Louis became Bishop of Basel in 1164.
Herman II	c.1150 Son of Volmar II	1175 – 1213	County of Frohburg	A lady from the Kyburg family eight children	1213 aged 62-63	
Louis III	c.1190 First son of Herman II	1213 – 1259	County of Zofingen	Gertrude of Habsburg six children	1259 aged 68-69	Children of Herman II, divided the land. Louis III was the founder of the Zofingen branch, with lands in the canton of Aargau; he was joined by his son Louis IV as co-ruler. According to some theories, Gertrude, wife of King Rudolf I of Germany, was also Herman's daughter. Herman III founded the Waldenburg branch, with lands in the canton of Basel. The other two brothers did not take part on the divisions. One of them, Ulrich, pursued an ecclesiastical career being an abbot at Frienisberg Abbey.
Herman III	c.1190 Second son of Herman II	1213 – February 1237	County of Waldenburg	Heilwig of Habsburg three children	February 1237 aged 46-47	Children of Herman II, divided the land. Louis III was the founder of the Zofingen branch, with lands in the canton of Aargau; he was joined by his son Louis IV as co-ruler. According to some theories, Gertrude, wife of King Rudolf I of Germany, was also Herman's daughter. Herman III founded the Waldenburg branch, with lands in the canton of Basel. The other two brothers did not take part on the divisions. One of them, Ulrich, pursued an ecclesiastical career being an abbot at Frienisberg Abbey.
Volmar III	c.1190 Third son of Herman II	1213 – 1226	County of Frohburg	Unmarried	1226 aged 35-36	Children of Herman II, divided the land. Louis III was the founder of the Zofingen branch, with lands in the canton of Aargau; he was joined by his son Louis IV as co-ruler. According to some theories, Gertrude, wife of King Rudolf I of Germany, was also Herman's daughter. Herman III founded the Waldenburg branch, with lands in the canton of Basel. The other two brothers did not take part on the divisions. One of them, Ulrich, pursued an ecclesiastical career being an abbot at Frienisberg Abbey.
Ulrich	c.1190 Fourth son of Herman II	1213 – 1223	County of Frohburg	Unmarried	1223 aged 32-33	Children of Herman II, divided the land. Louis III was the founder of the Zofingen branch, with lands in the canton of Aargau; he was joined by his son Louis IV as co-ruler. According to some theories, Gertrude, wife of King Rudolf I of Germany, was also Herman's daughter. Herman III founded the Waldenburg branch, with lands in the canton of Basel. The other two brothers did not take part on the divisions. One of them, Ulrich, pursued an ecclesiastical career being an abbot at Frienisberg Abbey.
Frohburg divided between Zofingen and Waldenburg
Herman IV & I	c.1210 Second son of Louis III and Gertrude of Habsburg	c.1230 – 15 May 1253	County of Homberg	A lady from the House of Homberg four children	15 May 1253 aged 42-43	Inherited the fief of Homberg through marriage, and left Zofingen to his brother Louis.
Louis IV	c.1220 Son of Herman III and Heilwig of Habsburg	February 1237 - 22 November 1281	County of Waldenburg	Agnes of Bechburg three children	22 November 1281 aged 60-61	
Hartmann I	c.1220 Third son of Louis III and Gertrude of Habsburg	1259 – 1285	County of Zofingen	Clementia before 1263 no children Ita of Wolhusen before 1280 three children	c.1285 aged 64-65	
Louis I	c.1240 First son of Herman IV & I	15 May 1253 - 27 April 1289	County of Homberg	Elisabeth of Rapperswil; 15 February 1283 six children	27 April 1289; Schoschalde aged 48-49	Children of Herman IV/I, ruled jointly. Louis I possibly co-ruled with his wife in her County of Rapperswil.
Frederick	c.1240 Second son of Herman IV & I	15 May 1253 - 8 February 1285	County of Homberg	Unmarried	8 February 1285 aged 44-454	Children of Herman IV/I, ruled jointly. Louis I possibly co-ruled with his wife in her County of Rapperswil.
Werner I	c.1240 Third son of Herman IV & I	15 May 1253 - 6 February 1273	County of Homberg	Kunigunde two children	6 February 1273 aged 32-33	Children of Herman IV/I, ruled jointly. Louis I possibly co-ruled with his wife in her County of Rapperswil.
Herman V	c.1240 First son of Louis IV and Agnes of Bechburg	22 November 1281 – December 1291	County of Waldenburg	Unmarried	December 1291 aged 50-51	Left no descendants. He was succeeded by his younger brother.
Louis V	c.1240 Son of Hartmann I and Ita of Wolhusen	c.1285 – 1299	County of Zofingen	Unmarried	July 1307 aged 66-67	In 1299 he sold Zofingen to the Habsburgs. Left no descendants.
Zofingen annexed to the House of Habsburg
Werner II	1284; First son of Louis I and Elisabeth of Rapperswil	27 April 1289 – 21 March 1320	County of Homberg (until 1303) County of Rapperswil (in 1/2 since 1289; became their sole fief since 1303)	Maria of Oettingen (d. 10 July 1369); 11 June 1315 or 6 April 1316 two children	21 March 1320 aged 35-36	Children of Louis I and Elisabeth of Rapperswil, ruled jointly with their cousin Herman II (son of Werner I). Wener and Louis's mother ceded them her possessions in Western Switzerland ( canton of Schwyz) after their father's death (1289). Werner II was also a Minnesinger. In 1303, Homberg was sold to Basel; the brothers remained with their mother's inheritance. Without children, their deaths possibly meant that their possessions became part of Switzerland.
Louis II	c.1285 Second son of Louis I and Elisabeth of Rapperswil	27 April 1289 – 1315	County of Homberg (until 1303) County of Rapperswil (in 1/2 since 1289; became their sole fief since 1303)	Unmarried	1315 aged 29-30	Children of Louis I and Elisabeth of Rapperswil, ruled jointly with their cousin Herman II (son of Werner I). Wener and Louis's mother ceded them her possessions in Western Switzerland ( canton of Schwyz) after their father's death (1289). Werner II was also a Minnesinger. In 1303, Homberg was sold to Basel; the brothers remained with their mother's inheritance. Without children, their deaths possibly meant that their possessions became part of Switzerland.
Herman II	c.1270 Second son of Werner I and Kunigunde	27 April 1289 – 19 November 1303	County of Homberg	Unmarried	19 November 1303 aged 32-33	Children of Louis I and Elisabeth of Rapperswil, ruled jointly with their cousin Herman II (son of Werner I). Wener and Louis's mother ceded them her possessions in Western Switzerland ( canton of Schwyz) after their father's death (1289). Werner II was also a Minnesinger. In 1303, Homberg was sold to Basel; the brothers remained with their mother's inheritance. Without children, their deaths possibly meant that their possessions became part of Switzerland.
Homberg sold to the Bishopric of Basel; 1/2 Rapperswil annexed to Switzerland
Volmar IV	c.1250 Second son of Louis IV and Agnes of Bechburg	December 1291 – 20 January 1320	County of Waldenburg	Katharina of Toggenburg (d. 18 February 1313) three children	20 January 1320 aged 69-70	
John I	c.1300 First son of Volmar IV and Katharina of Toggenburg	20 January 1320 – April 1366	County of Waldenburg	Adelaide of Ramstein (d.c.1370); 3 November 1326 no children	April 1366 aged 65-66	Sons of Volmar IV, probably ruled jointly. Herman was also abbot of St. Urban Abbey. After both deaths with no descendants, their line died out. Their properties were sold to the Count of Nidau and the Bishop of Basel.
Herman VI	c.1300 Second son of Volmar IV and Katharina of Toggenburg	20 January 1320 – 19 October 1367	County of Waldenburg	Unmarried	19 October 1367 aged 66-67	Sons of Volmar IV, probably ruled jointly. Herman was also abbot of St. Urban Abbey. After both deaths with no descendants, their line died out. Their properties were sold to the Count of Nidau and the Bishop of Basel.
Waldenburg annexed to the Bishopric of Basel and the County of Nidau

== See also ==
- House of Homberg

== Bibliography ==
- Hektor Ammann, Die Frohburger und ihre Städtegründungen Zürich, 1934.
- Peter Schenker: Frohburg [Froburg], von in German, French and Italian in the online Historical Dictionary of Switzerland.
- Franziska Hälg-Steffen: Homberg, von in German, French and Italian in the online Historical Dictionary of Switzerland.
