= Neu-Thierstein Castle =

Castle in Büsserach, Switzerland

- Schloss Thierstein
- Büsserach
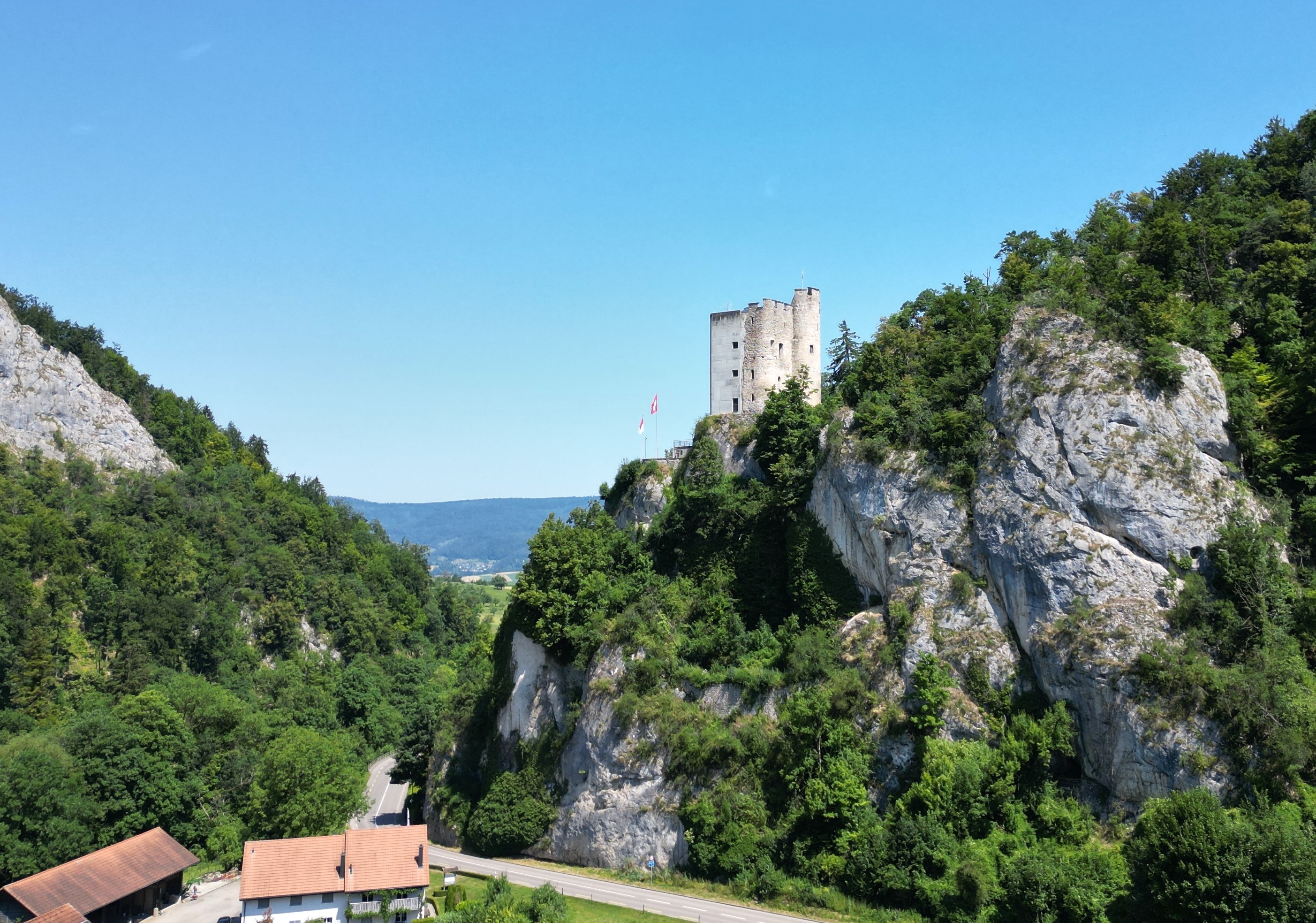
- Neu-Thierstein

Site information
- Type: spur castle
- Code: CH-SO
- Condition: ruin

Location
- Location within Canton of Solothurn Location within Switzerland
- Coordinates: 47°23′06″N 7°32′18″E

Site history
- Built: c. 1180/1190

Neu-Thierstein Castle is a castle ruin in the Swiss municipality of Büsserach in the canton of Solothurn, Switzerland. Also referred to as Schloss Thierstein, it is a symbolic landmark of the Lüsseltal valley and the Schwarzbubenland area.

== History ==
The castle was erected in 1100 by the House of Saugern-Pfeffingen to serve as a bailiwick seat. The nearby monastery of Beinwil was erected at the same time. In early days the castle was named Bello. In the 12th century the Counts of Von Thierstein inherited the castle from the House of Saugern-Pfeffingen. The new name of Thierstein for the castle itself is documented since 1400.

Solothurners sacked the castle several times: in 1445 during the Battle of St. Jacob, again in 1467, and in 1499 during the Swabian War. In 1522, Solothurn finally bought the castle for good, following the extinction of the house of Von Thierstein. The castle became the administrative headquarters of the Thierstein district, which remains named after the extinct house.

In 1798, after the founding of the Helvetic Republic, the castle was auctioned off for demolition. However in the 19th century, private citizens stopped the destruction of the castle with plans to renovate the ruins in a romantic style. Since 1894, Neu-Thierstein is owned by the Basel Chapter of the Swiss Alpine Club, which operates a club house out of the castle.

On March 2, 1997, a part of the ruin spontaneously collapsed. This collapse also covered the nearby access road Passwangstrasse with 20 m^{3} of rock debris. Following the collapse, the municipality of Büsserach bought the ruin from the SAC for 25'000 CHF and reconstructed the southwestern access road with concrete reinforcements. In total, the repairs cost approximtely 2 milion CHF, with contributions from the Swiss government, the canton of Solothurn, and donations from the public.

== See also ==
- List of castles and fortresses in Switzerland
