= Walram of Thierstein =

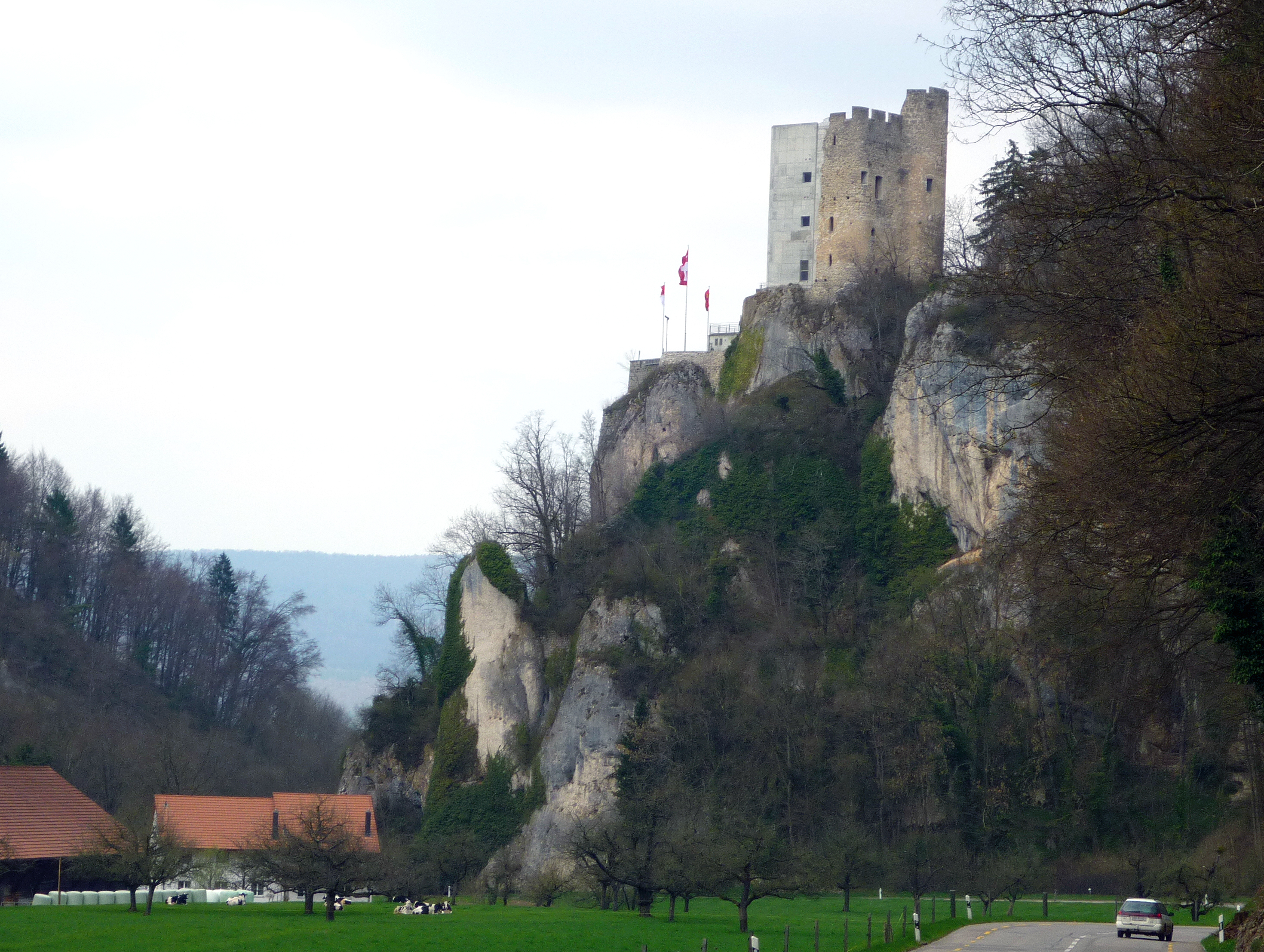
- Born: before 1339
- Died: 22 May 1403
- Noble family: von Thierstein
- Spouse: Adelaide of Hohenlohe
- Father: Walram II of Thierstein
- Mother: Agnes of Neuenburg-Arberg

Count Walram III of Thierstein-Pfeffingen (also known as Walraff; before 1339 – 22 May 1403) was a German nobleman. He was the ruling Lord of Pfeffingen and was married to Adelaied of Hohenlohe (before 1341 – 1381).

Walram is best known due to a legend related to the 1356 Basel earthquake.

== Legend ==
On Tuesday, October 18, 1356, Count Walram and the Knight of Bärenfels were riding to Basel after a successful hunt. Initially, they failed to notice a pilgrim traveling in the opposite direction near Reinach. The pilgrim had to jump aside to avoid their horses. The count and the knight then reined in their horses and cheerfully greeted the frightened pilgrim. The pilgrim calmed down and advised the two riders to remain calm and cautious to prevent an accident.

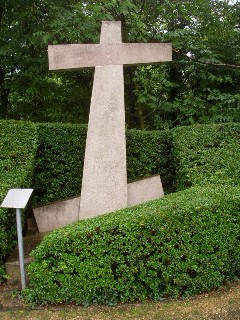
Commemorative cross in Reinach

The knight of Bärenfels burst out laughing and after a while both riders mocked the pilgrim and rode away. When they continued their way to Basel, Count Walram became more and more pensive and dejected. He regretted his bad behaviour and his conscience tormented him more and more. Shortly before they reached the Basel city gate, he decided to turn back. He said goodbye to the knight and turned his horse. He intended to find the pilgrim and apologize. However, he failed to find the pilgrim, and rode back to his castle. As he was crossing a wide field, he heard a dull roll and the ground beneath his feet began to shake violently. His horse was frightened and reared, and Walram saw to his horror how the proud castles of Pfeffingen, Reichenstein, Birseck, and Dorneck collapsed around him and large smoke clouds rose to the sky. After the earthquake had stopped, Walram quickly rode to his castle, which had suffered extensive damage. Fortunately, his family was unharmed. He found his youngest child in his crib, between the ruins of the castle.

The knight of Bärenfels was just riding through the city gate when the earthquake hit, and was killed by a falling stone.

Walram was grateful for his miraculous escape and erected a cross on the side of the road at the spot where he had met the pilgrim. The skewed cross reminds passers-by of the earthquake that reduced Basel and the surrounding area to rubble in 1356, and of the remorseful Count Walram and the fateful death of the knight of Bärenfels. The cross has since been renewed several times, and currently stands a few meters away from the busy main road connecting Basel and Pfeffingen.
