= Sissacherfluh Castle =

Castle in Sissach, Switzerland

- Sissach
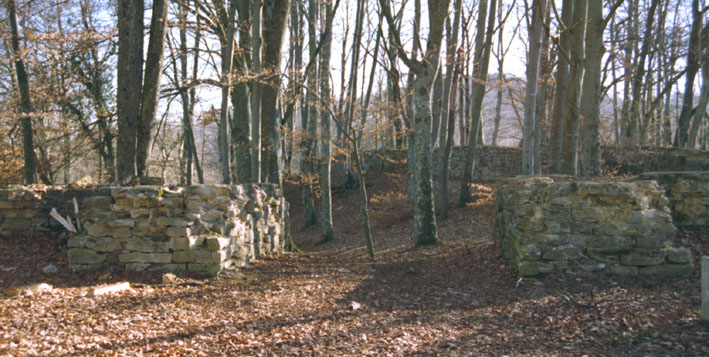
- Interior walls and door

Site information
- Type: Refuge castle, hill castle
- Code: CH-BL
- Condition: ruin

Location
- Coordinates: 47°28′49.55″N 7°49′4.05″E
- Height: 699 m above the sea

Site history
- Built: Bronze Age, Early Middle Ages, Thirty Years' War

Ruins of Sissacherfluh Castle (German: Ruine Sissacherfluh) is a castle in the municipality of Sissach of the canton of Basel-Land in Switzerland. It is a Swiss heritage site of national significance.

== See also ==
- List of castles in Switzerland
