= Fortified Church of St. Arbogast =

- Wehrkirche St. Arbogast
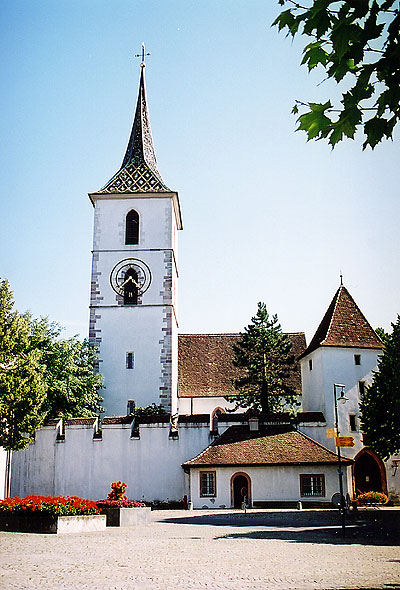
- The fortified church of St. Arbogast

- Location within Canton of Basel-Land Location within Switzerland
- 47°31′20″N 7°38′44″E
- Location: Muttenz, Basel-Landschaft
- Country: Switzerland
- Denomination: Swiss Reformed
- Previous denomination: Roman Catholic
- Website: www.refmuttenz.ch/ueber_uns/dorfkirche.php

History
- Status: village church
- Founded: 8th century
- Dedication: Saint Arbogast
- Events: c. 1100 Second church built mid-12th century Third church built 1356 Basel earthquake 1529 Protestant Reformation

Architecture
- Functional status: active
- Heritage designation: Swiss heritage site of national significance

Administration
- Division: Reformierte Kirche Baselland
- Deanery: Birs-Rhein

Clergy
- Pastor(s): Stefan Dietrich, Hanspeter Plattner-Kirsche, Mirjam Wagner

The Fortified Church of St. Arbogast (German: Wehrkirche St. Arbogast) in the municipality of Muttenz in the Swiss canton of Basel-Land is the only church in Switzerland that is surrounded by a defensive wall. It is an example of the fortified church type of construction, and is a Swiss heritage site of national significance. The church is still used as a local village church.

== History ==
The first church on the site was built in the Early Middle Ages, possibly as early as the 6th century but certainly by the 8th century. It is first mentioned in 793. Around 1000 the nave was extended toward the west. The second church was built around 1100. This new building had a wider and longer nave and the choir was rectangular with massive walls. The second church was replaced in the mid-12th century by the third church, parts of which still stand today. The third church, a Romanesque building, had a round apse, a rectangular choir and a bell tower on the north side which were probably grafted on the earlier nave. The church was heavily damaged in the 1356 Basel earthquake. Three years later, under Konrad Münch-Löwenberg, the church was rebuilt. The rounded apse was replaced with the current rectangular choir and the nave was raised to a height of about 1.5 m (4.9 ft) below its current height. In 1420 Hans Thüring Münch-Eptingen became the owner of the village and had a new, larger bell tower built. Five years later, his mother gave the church a bell.

Under Hans Thüring Münch-Eptingen the church was fortified with a seven-metre-tall (23 ft) rampart around 1435. The walls had two gatehouses north and south of the church. By fortifying St. Arbogast, the towns people now had defenses to replace the destroyed Hintere Wartenberg, Mittlere Wartenberg and Vordere Wartenberg Castles. The northern gatehouse is decorated with the coat of arms of the Münch or Münch von Münchenstein family. In 1450 Hans Thüring had the interior of the church covered in frescoes. The Münch family had to sell the right to appoint priests and collect money for the church to Peter zum Luft in the late 15th century. He probably built the charnal house adjoining the church. After Peter's death, Arnold zum Luft took over the church in 1474. Under Arnold, the nave was raised the final 1.5 m (4.9 ft) to its current height and in 1504 given a richly painted wooden ceiling by Ulrich Bruder. Large windows were added on the north and south sides of the nave. Additional frescoes depicting the legend of St. Arbogast were added in 1507. In 1513 the charnal house was decorated with frescoes on the interior and exterior walls and ceiling.

In 1517 the city of Basel took over the church. When Basel converted to the new faith of the Protestant Reformation in 1528, St. Arbogast became a Protestant church. The relics of St. Arbogast were destroyed and the altars were sold off. The frescoes were painted over as part of the wave of iconoclasm from the Reformation.

The Sigristenhaus was built outside the south wall in 1553. In 1630 the bell tower had an additional story added to it and was topped with a pointed spire. At the same time, the nave windows were replaced with new pointed arch windows and another pointed arch window was added on the south side of the choir. During the 17th century the Wächterhaus was added to the south wall to the west of the Sigristenhaus.

The town decided to demolish the walls and gatehouses around the church in 1853, but Zurich historian Johann Rudolf Rahn convinced the council in Basel to preserve them instead. In 1880/81 the church was renovated and the old frescoes were discovered. However their condition was judged to be too poor and they were covered in new plaster. The only exception was a painting of the Last Judgment above the portal which was repainted in 1884 by Karl Jauslin. In the 1970s the church was renovated again. This time, the 19th century plaster was removed and the medieval frescoes were restored. A new organ was built by Neidhart & Lhòte in Geneva in 1976. Today's congregation forms part of the Evangelical Reformed Church of the Canton Basel-Landschaft.

== Frescoes ==
=== Nave ===
All three walls are decorated with a series of paintings of the Apostles (1507). Additionally, the south side had the life of Mary and the Ten Commandments (1507). The west side is the Last Judgment (1507), repainted in 1884 by Karl Jauslin. The north side is a fresco of the Passion (1507).

=== Choir ===
On the north side of the choir above the sacristy is the apostle's medallion from the early 14th century. A fragment of another medallion is visible on the opposite wall. Also on the north wall are two frescoes of the life of St. Arbogast from 1450. In the first King Dagobert brings his son Siegbert, killed in the hunt, to Bishop of Strassburg, Arbogast, and asks for help. In the second the king and his wife pray as Arbogast awakens Siegbert from death.

On the south side the frescoes depict the Assumption of Mary and her crowning in heaven. Another fresco from 1450 shows Saint Nicholas giving three gold purses to the daughters of a poor man.

The vault of the choir features the coat of arms of Münch-Löwenberg from the second half of the 14th century. The remaining frescoes were too badly damaged to be repaired. The rest of the paintings were badly destroyed.

=== Charnal house ===
The exterior of the charnal house has a fresco of Saint Christopher on the left side and protective mantel on the right. Saint Michael is above the door and the year 1513 is above the window. Inside the charnal house is a fresco of the Last Judgement from 1513 and an example of the Legend of the grateful dead from the same year. The legend is of a knight who always prays for the souls of the dead. One day he is attacked by robbers and the dead come to his aid, driving off the robbers.

== Gallery ==
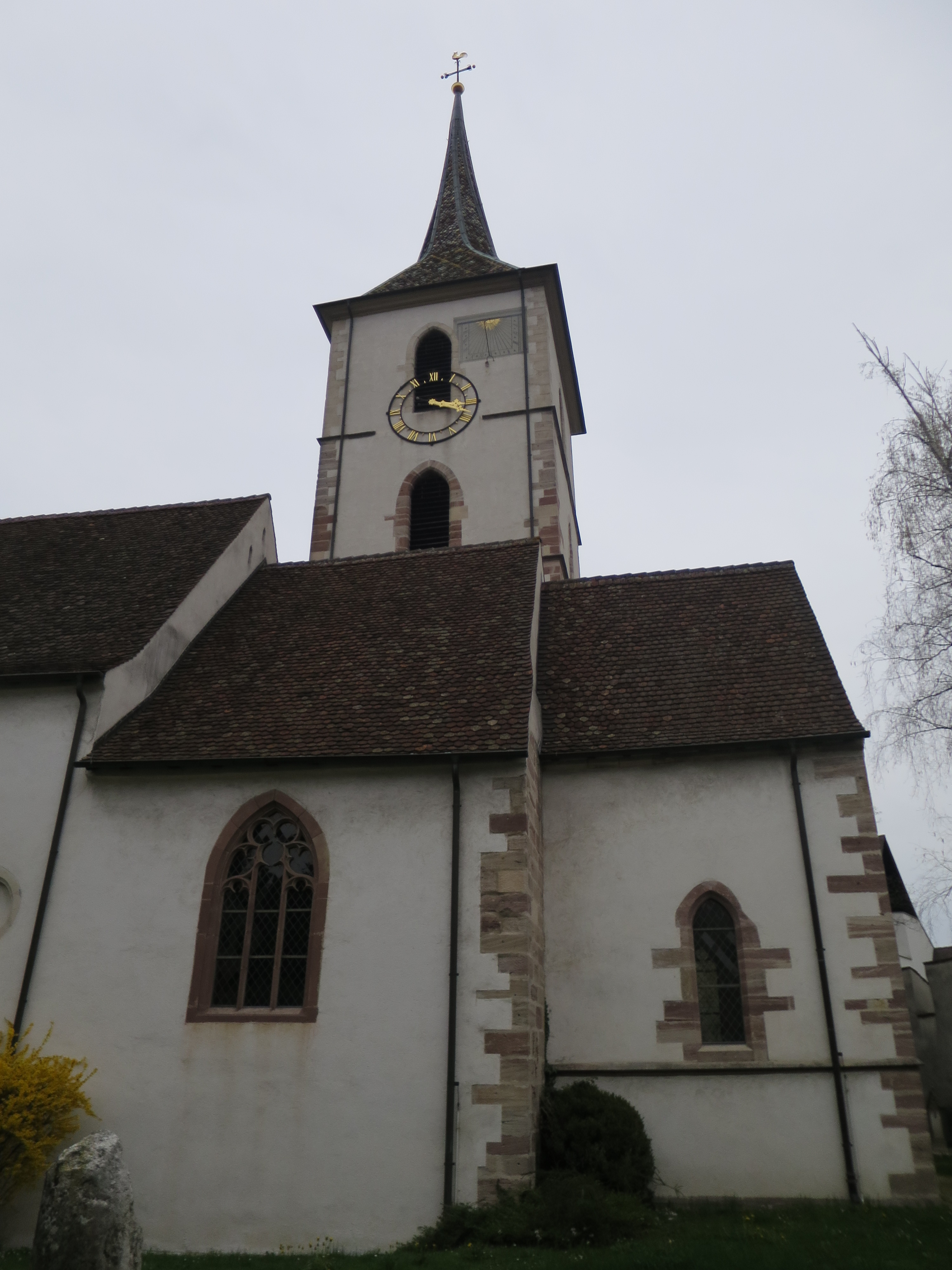
Exterior of the church

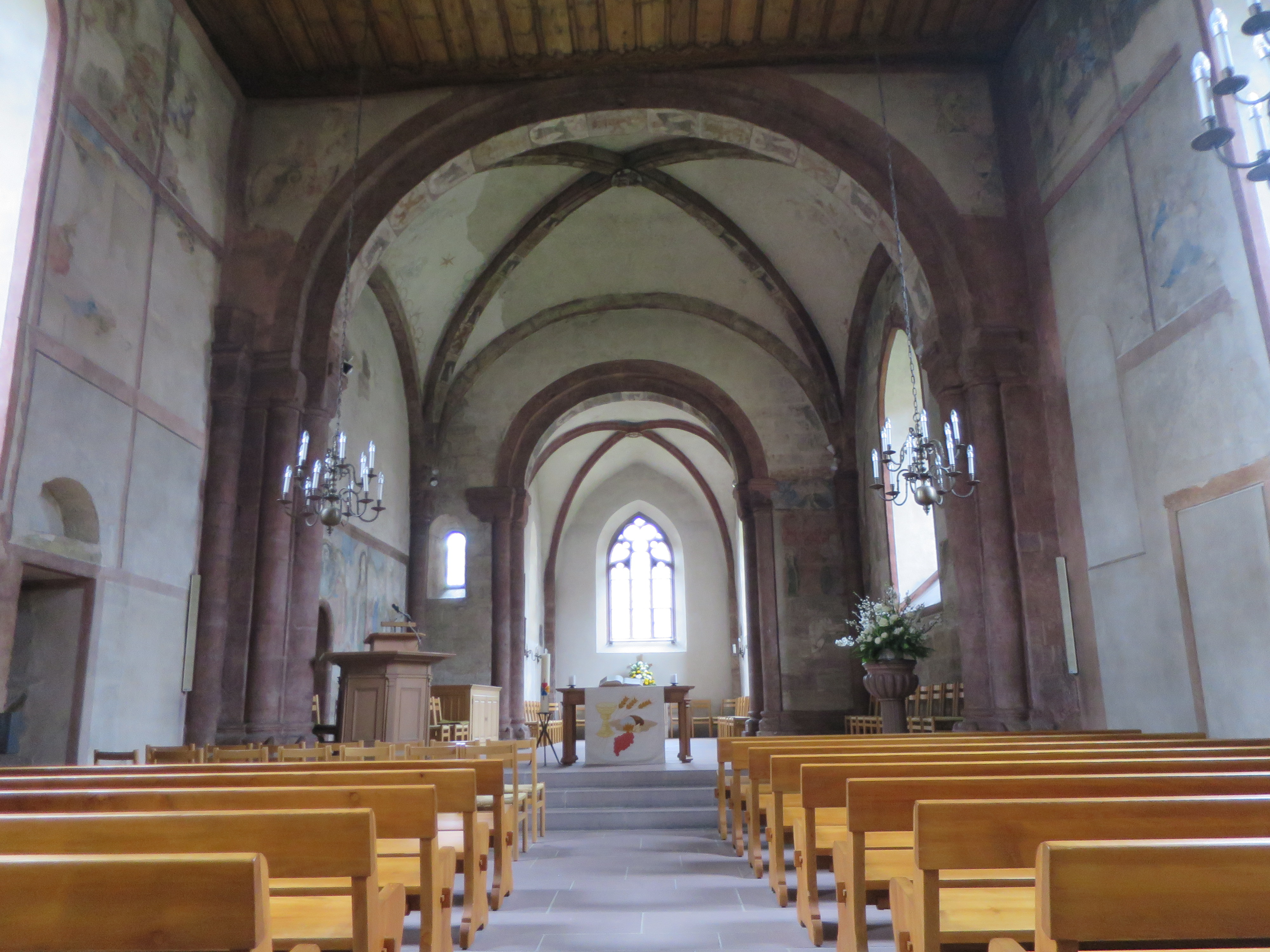
Interior, looking toward the choir

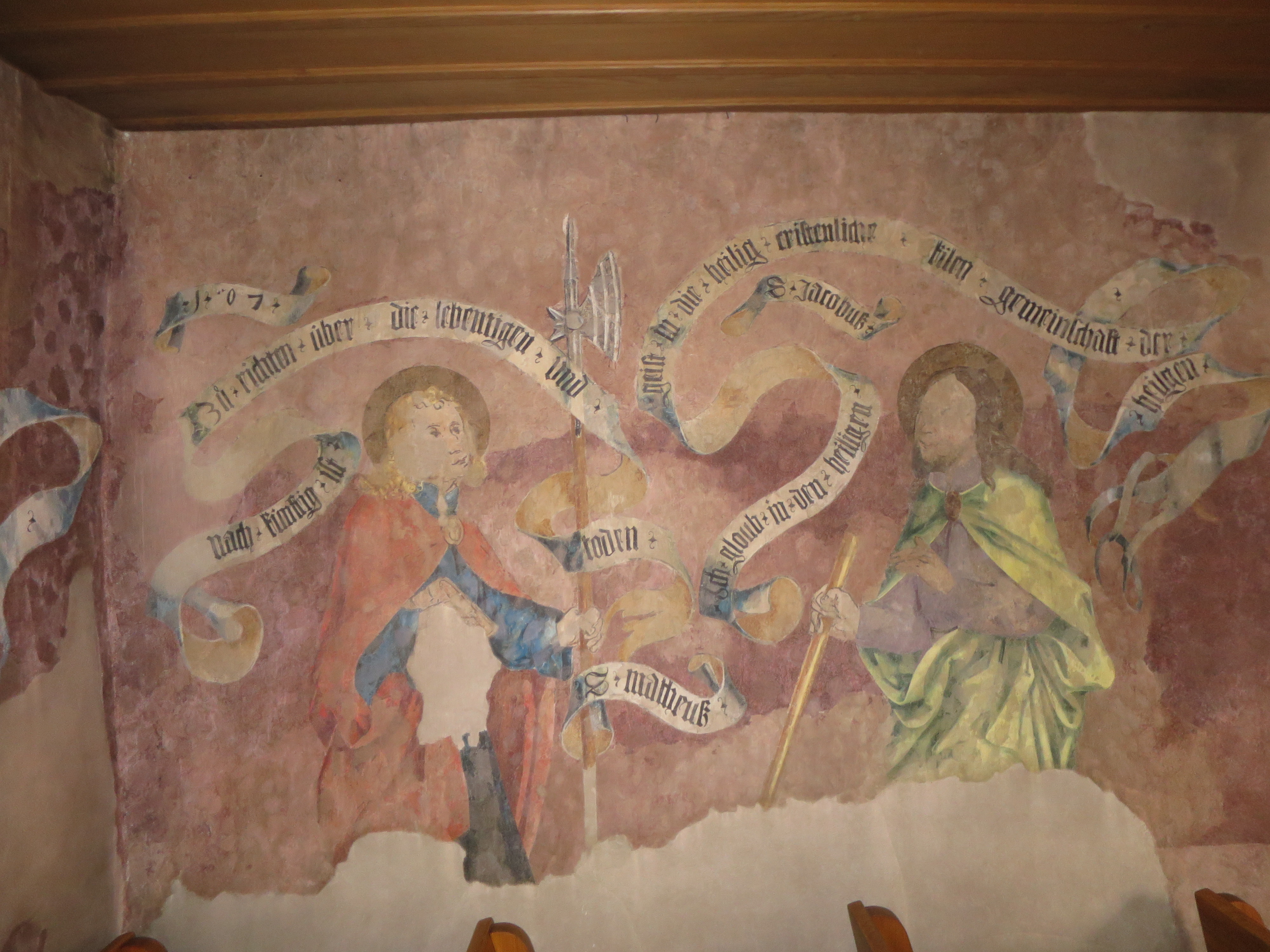
Late Gothic Fresco

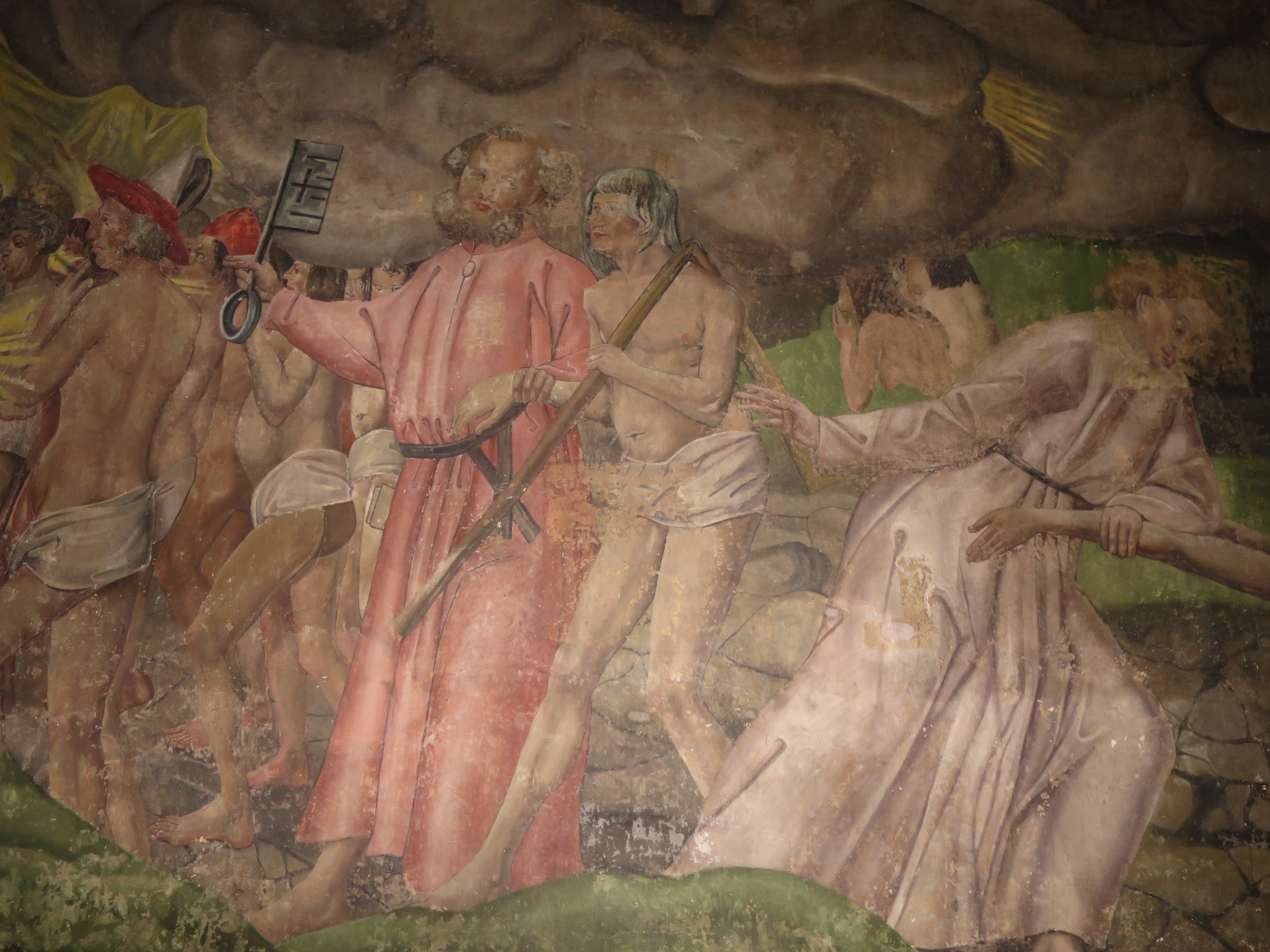
The Last Judgement fresco

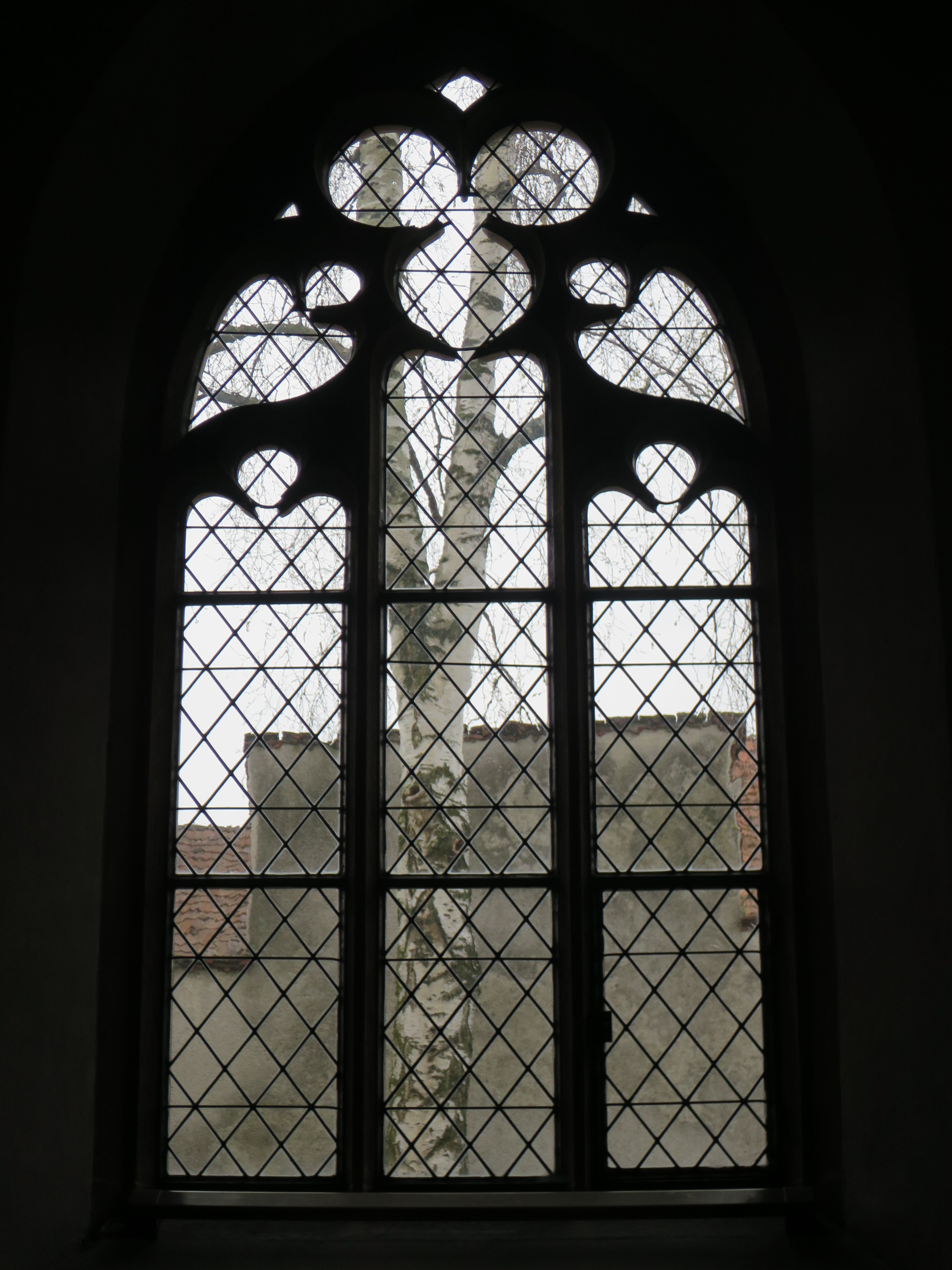
Window of the choir

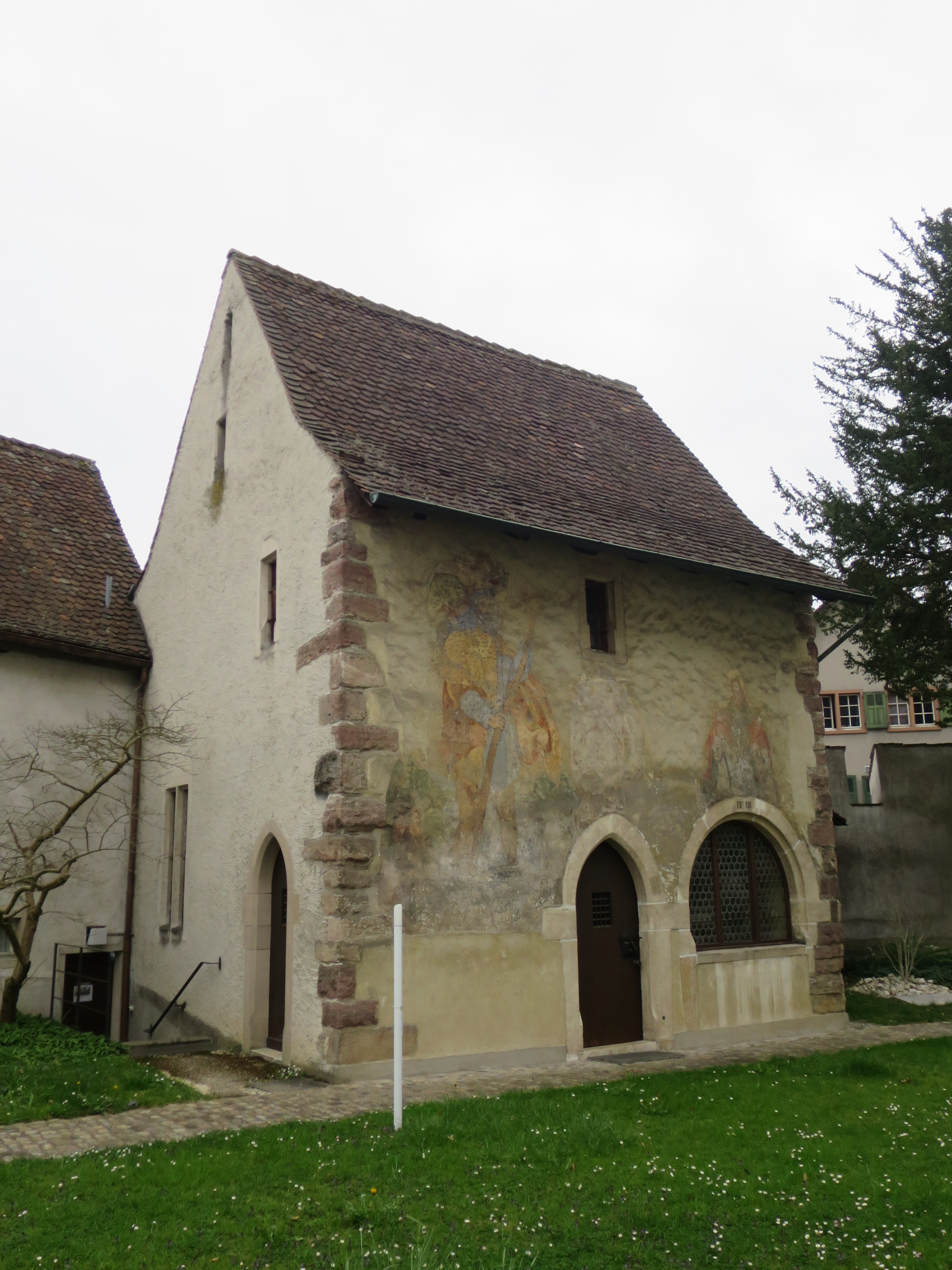
Charnal house

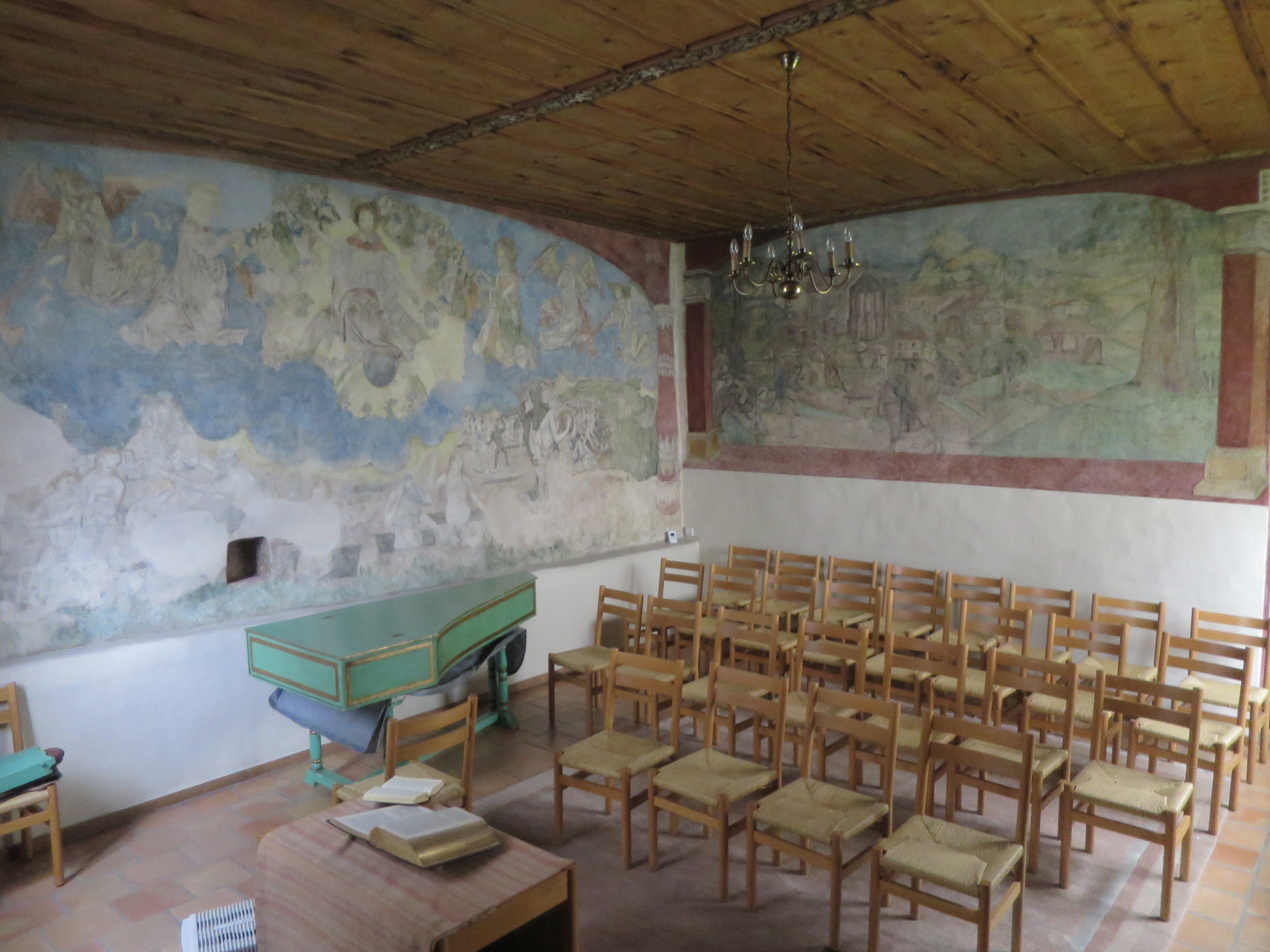
Charnal house interior

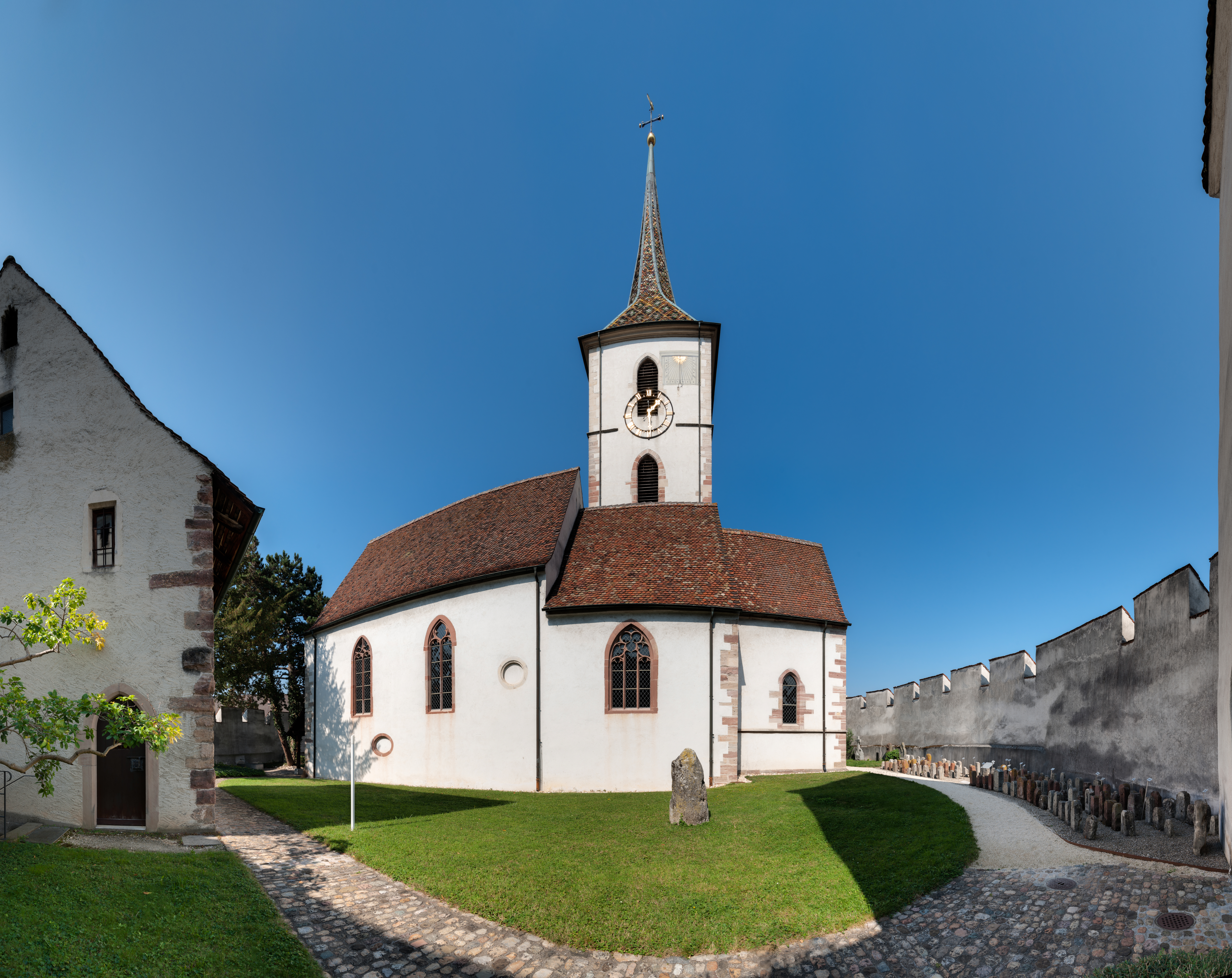
Church seen from within the rampart
