= Wildenstein Castle (Bubendorf) =

Castle in Bubendorf, Switzerland

- Bubendorf
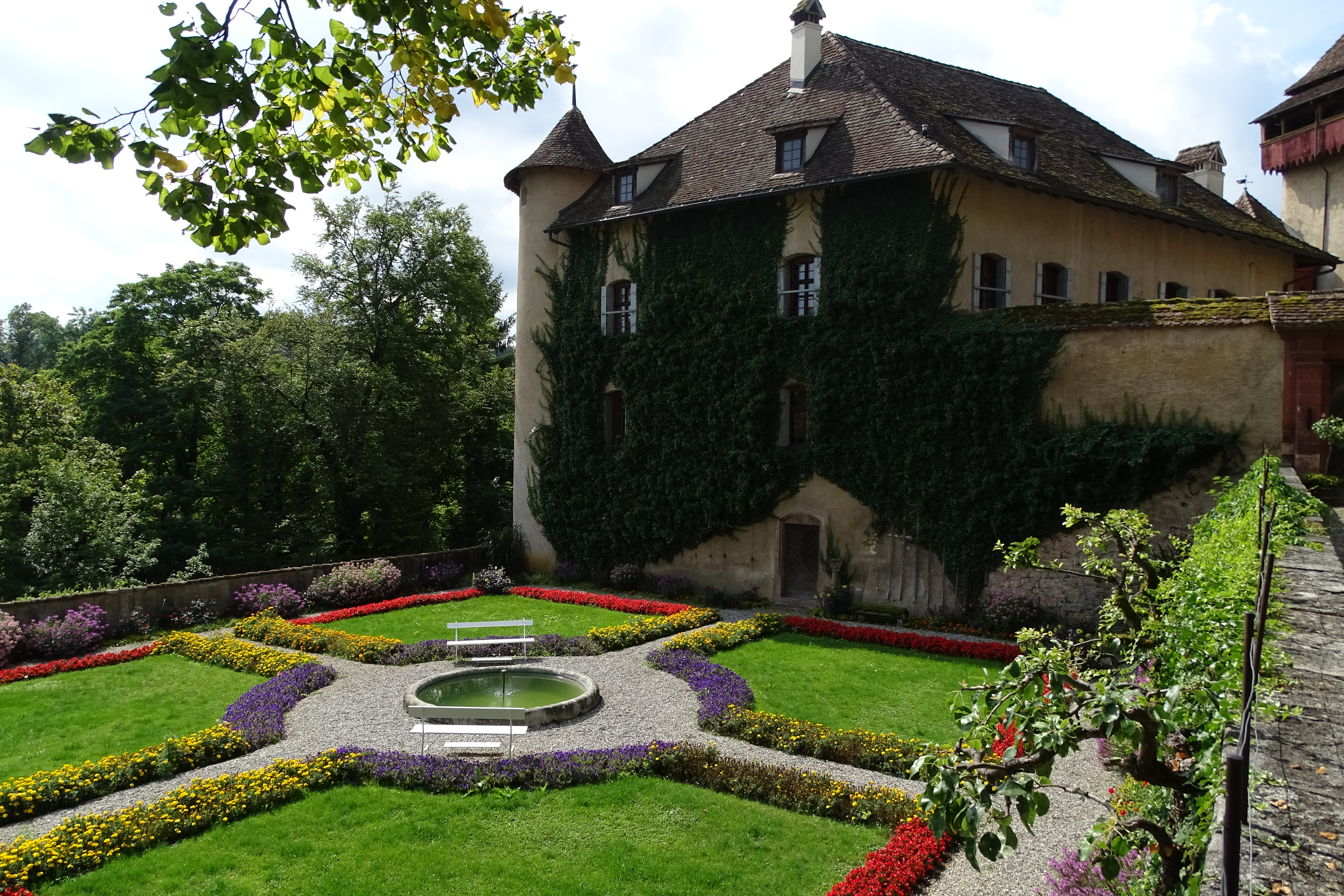
- Castle and gardens

Site information
- Code: CH-BL
- Condition: preserved

Location
- Coordinates: 47°25′54″N 7°44′9″E

Site history
- Built: about 1200

Wildenstein Castle (German: Schloss Wildenstein) is a castle in the municipality of Bubendorf in the canton of Basel-Land in Switzerland. It is a Swiss heritage site of national significance.

The castle was acquired by the local council in 1995 and is now regularly used for cultural events.

== See also ==
- List of castles in Switzerland
