= Farnsburg Castle =

Castle in Ormalingen, Switzerland

- Ormalingen
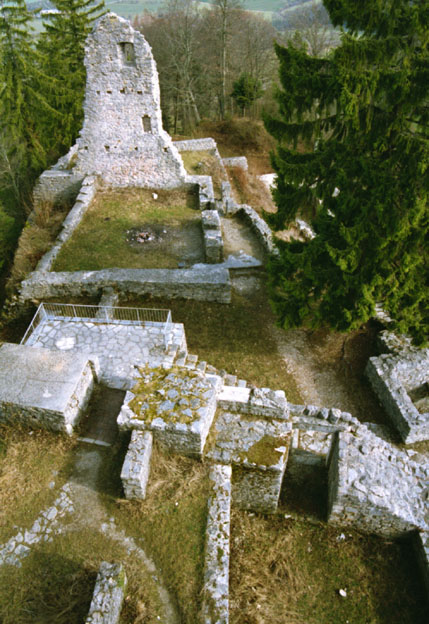
- Ruins of Farnsburg Castle

Site information
- Type: hill castle
- Code: CH-BL
- Condition: ruin

Location
- Coordinates: 47°29′35.5″N 7°52′14.05″E
- Height: 734 m above the sea

Site history
- Built: Between 1319 and 1342

Farnsburg Castle (German: Ruine Farnsburg) is a castle in the municipality of Ormalingen in the canton of Basel-Land in Switzerland. It is a Swiss heritage site of national significance.

Farnsburg was built in 1330 by the Lords of Thierstein and later acquired by the Habsburg barons of Falkenstein. The barons went on to fight in the war against the Swiss, resulting in a siege of the castle in 1444.

The castle, which was still in good condition, changed ownership several times over the centuries until 1709, when the bailiff in residence at the time was expelled and the castle set on fire. Afterwards, the castle stones were used to build new castles elsewhere and Farnsburg fell quickly into ruin.

== See also ==
- List of castles in Switzerland
