= Pfeffingen =

- Municipality
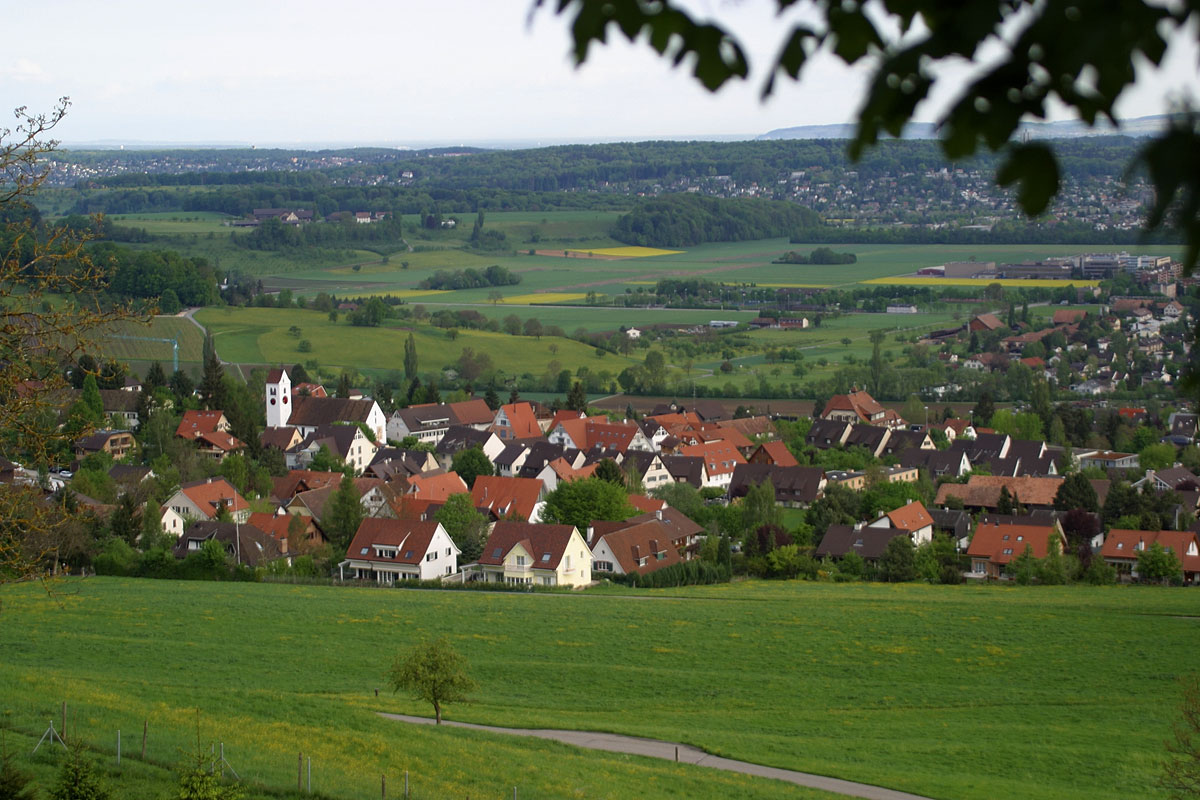

- Coat of arms
- Location of Pfeffingen
- Location within Switzerland Location within Canton of Basel-Landschaft
- Coordinates: 47°27′N 7°35′E
- Country: Switzerland
- Canton: Basel-Landschaft
- District: Arlesheim

Area
  - Total: 4.89 km^{2} (1.89 sq mi)
- Elevation: 392 m (1,286 ft)

Population (June 2021)
  - Total: 2,430
  - Density: 497/km^{2} (1,290/sq mi)
- Time zone: UTC+01:00 (CET)
  - Summer (DST): UTC+02:00 (CEST)
- Postal code: 4148
- SFOS number: 2772
- ISO 3166 code: CH-BL
- Surrounded by: Aesch, Blauen, Duggingen, Ettingen, Grellingen, Nenzlingen
- Website: www.pfeffingen.ch

Pfeffingen (Swiss German: Pfäffige) is a municipality in the district of Arlesheim in the canton of Basel-Country in Switzerland.

== History ==
Pfeffingen is first mentioned in 1156 as Fefingen.

== Geography ==
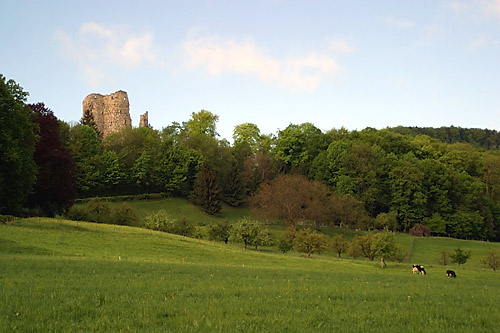
Rolling hillside around Pfeffingen Castle

Pfeffingen has an area, as of 2009, of 4.9 square kilometers (1.9 sq mi). Of this area, 1.57 km^{2} (0.61 sq mi) or 32.0% is used for agricultural purposes, while 2.58 km^{2} (1.00 sq mi) or 52.7% is forested. Of the rest of the land, 0.7 km^{2} (0.27 sq mi) or 14.3% is settled (buildings or roads).

Of the built up area, housing and buildings made up 10.0% and transportation infrastructure made up 3.5%. Out of the forested land, 50.4% of the total land area is heavily forested and 2.2% is covered with orchards or small clusters of trees. Of the agricultural land, 3.5% is used for growing crops and 26.3% is pastures, while 2.2% is used for orchards or vine crops.

The municipality is located in the Arlesheim district, on a terrace that runs along the eastern edge of the Blauenkette on the route over the Platten pass.

== Coat of arms ==
The blazon of the municipal coat of arms is Argent, from a Bar Azure a semi-fleur-de-lis issuant of the same.

== Demographics ==
Pfeffingen has a population (as of June 2021) of 2,430. As of 2008, 8.7% of the population are resident foreign nationals. Over the last 10 years (1997–2007) the population has changed at a rate of 10.7%.

Most of the population (as of 2000) speaks German (1,921 or 94.8%), with English being second most common (36 or 1.8%) and French being third (22 or 1.1%). There are 2 people who speak Romansh.

As of 2008, the gender distribution of the population was 49.4% male and 50.6% female. The population was made up of 1,966 Swiss citizens (89.3% of the population), and 235 non-Swiss residents (10.7%) Of the population in the municipality 337 or about 16.6% were born in Pfeffingen and lived there in 2000. There were 539 or 26.6% who were born in the same canton, while 827 or 40.8% were born somewhere else in Switzerland, and 296 or 14.6% were born outside of Switzerland.

In 2008 there were 11 live births to Swiss citizens and 2 births to non-Swiss citizens, and in same time span there were 13 deaths of Swiss citizens. Ignoring immigration and emigration, the population of Swiss citizens decreased by 2 while the foreign population increased by 2. There were 3 Swiss men and 4 Swiss women who immigrated back to Switzerland. At the same time, there were 5 non-Swiss men and 8 non-Swiss women who immigrated from another country to Switzerland. The total Swiss population change in 2008 (from all sources, including moves across municipal borders) was an increase of 39 and the non-Swiss population change was an increase of 2 people. This represents a population growth rate of 1.9%.

The age distribution, as of 2010, in Pfeffingen is; 123 children or 5.6% of the population are between 0 and 6 years old and 344 teenagers or 15.6% are between 7 and 19. Of the adult population, 202 people or 9.2% of the population are between 20 and 29 years old. 160 people or 7.3% are between 30 and 39, 439 people or 19.9% are between 40 and 49, and 518 people or 23.5% are between 50 and 64. The senior population distribution is 343 people or 15.6% of the population are between 65 and 79 years old and there are 72 people or 3.3% who are over 80.

As of 2000, there were 763 people who were single and never married in the municipality. There were 1,131 married individuals, 53 widows or widowers and 80 individuals who are divorced.

As of 2000, there were 775 private households in the municipality, and an average of 2.6 persons per household. There were 144 households that consist of only one person and 50 households with five or more people. Out of a total of 784 households that answered this question, 18.4% were households made up of just one person and 2 were adults who lived with their parents. Of the rest of the households, there are 289 married couples without children, 306 married couples with children. There were 25 single parents with a child or children. There were 9 households that were made up unrelated people and 9 households that were made some sort of institution or another collective housing.

In 2000 there were 603 single family homes (or 87.9% of the total) out of a total of 686 inhabited buildings. There were 39 multi-family buildings (5.7%), along with 36 multi-purpose buildings that were mostly used for housing (5.2%) and 8 other use buildings (commercial or industrial) that also had some housing (1.2%). Of the single family homes 14 were built before 1919, while 161 were built between 1990 and 2000. The greatest number of single family homes (146) were built between 1971 and 1980.

In 2000 there were 809 apartments in the municipality. The most common apartment size was 5 rooms of which there were 270. There were 8 single room apartments and 538 apartments with five or more rooms. Of these apartments, a total of 762 apartments (94.2% of the total) were permanently occupied, while 36 apartments (4.4%) were seasonally occupied and 11 apartments (1.4%) were empty. As of 2007, the construction rate of new housing units was 2.4 new units per 1000 residents. The vacancy rate for the municipality, in 2008, was 0.68%.

The historical population is given in the following chart:

== Heritage sites of national significance ==
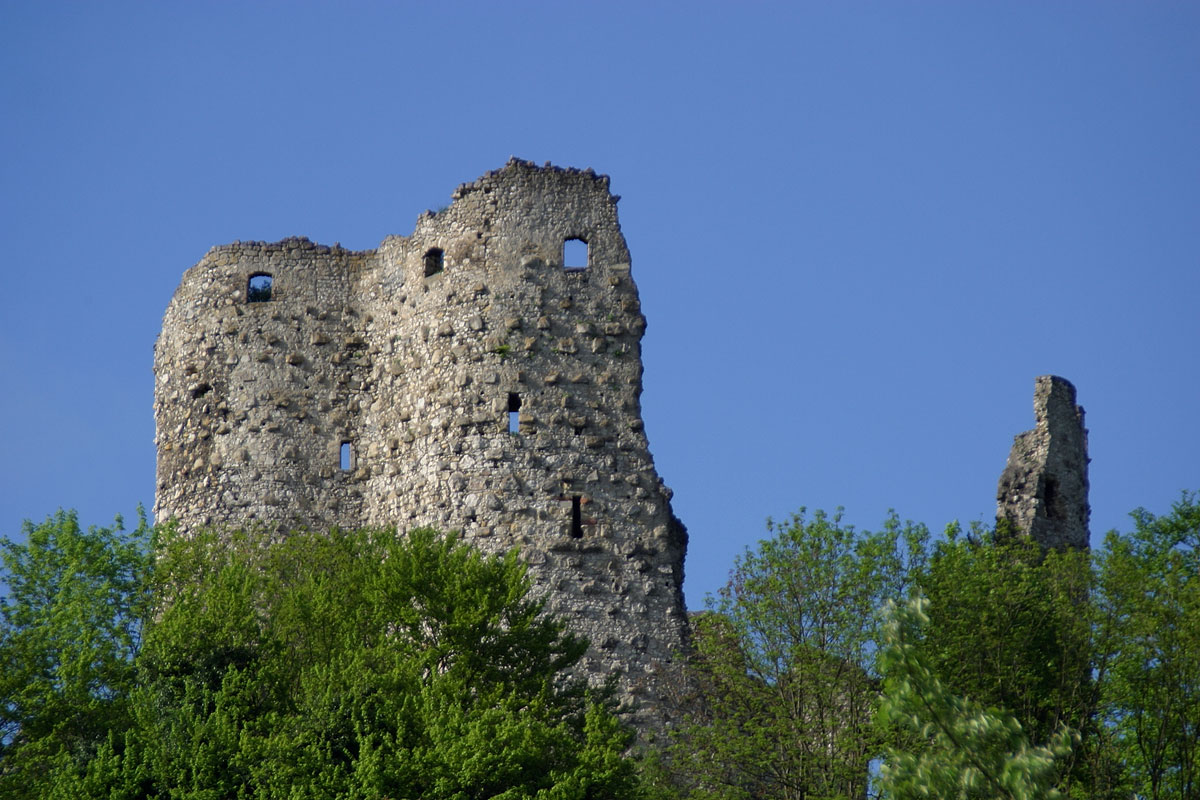
Pfeffingen Castle

The castle ruins of Pfeffingen, Engenstein, Münchsberg and Schalberg are listed as a Swiss heritage site of national significance.

== Politics ==
In the 2007 federal election the most popular party was the SVP which received 29.51% of the vote. The next three most popular parties were the FDP (20.91%), the SP (18.93%) and the CVP (17.7%). In the federal election, a total of 839 votes were cast, and the voter turnout was 53.0%.

== Economy ==
As of 2007, Pfeffingen had an unemployment rate of 0.93%. As of 2005, there were 27 people employed in the primary economic sector and about 10 businesses involved in this sector. 29 people were employed in the secondary sector and there were 9 businesses in this sector. 143 people were employed in the tertiary sector, with 50 businesses in this sector. There were 1,037 residents of the municipality who were employed in some capacity, of which females made up 41.2% of the workforce.

In 2008 the total number of full-time equivalent jobs was 169. The number of jobs in the primary sector was 11, all of which were in agriculture. The number of jobs in the secondary sector was 35, of which 20 or (57.1%) were in manufacturing and 15 (42.9%) were in construction. The number of jobs in the tertiary sector was 123. In the tertiary sector; 22 or 17.9% were in wholesale or retail sales or the repair of motor vehicles, 8 or 6.5% were in the movement and storage of goods, 3 or 2.4% were in a hotel or restaurant, 1 or 0.8% were in the information industry, 3 or 2.4% were the insurance or financial industry, 24 or 19.5% were technical professionals or scientists, 40 or 32.5% were in education and 3 or 2.4% were in health care.

In 2000, there were 98 workers who commuted into the municipality and 899 workers who commuted away. The municipality is a net exporter of workers, with about 9.2 workers leaving the municipality for every one entering. About 16.3% of the workforce coming into Pfeffingen are coming from outside Switzerland. Of the working population, 19.8% used public transportation to get to work, and 58.1% used a private car.

== Religion ==
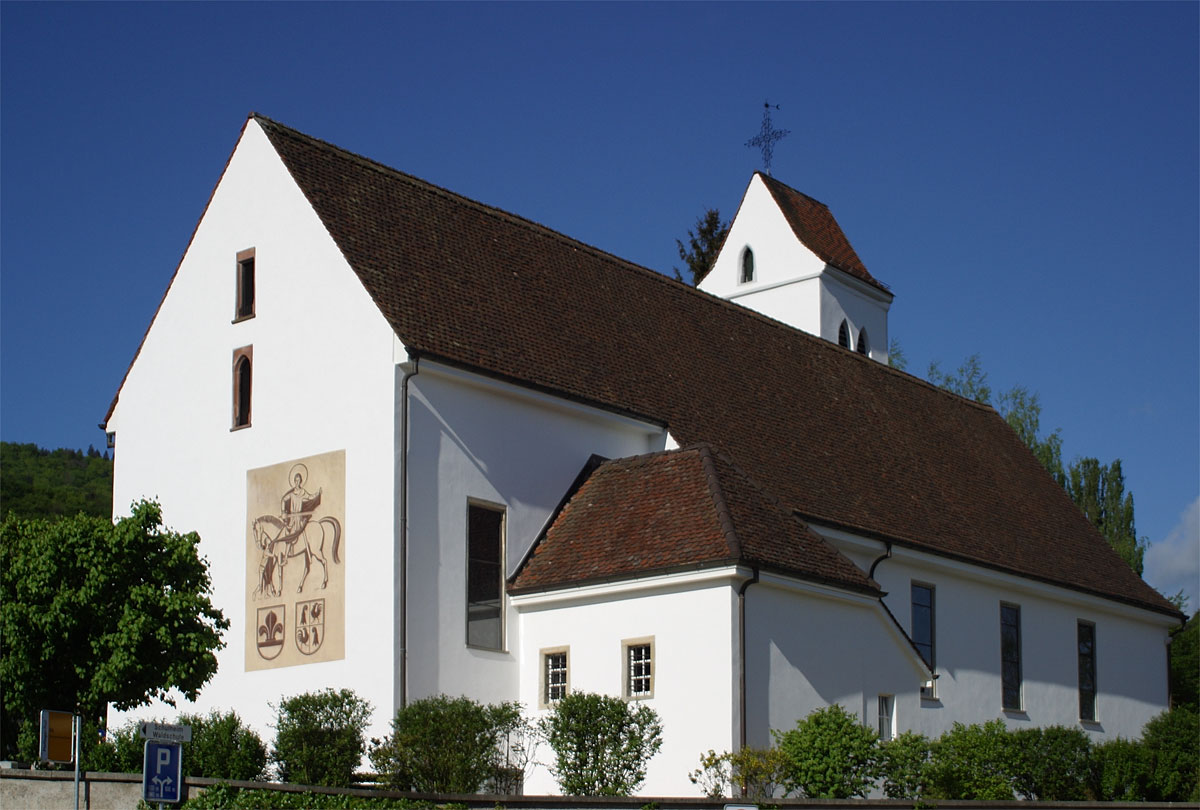
Church in Pfeffingen

From the 2000 census, 894 or 44.1% were Roman Catholic, while 689 or 34.0% belonged to the Swiss Reformed Church. Of the rest of the population, there were 7 members of an Orthodox church (or about 0.35% of the population), there were 2 individuals (or about 0.10% of the population) who belonged to the Christian Catholic Church, and there were 58 individuals (or about 2.86% of the population) who belonged to another Christian church. There were 8 individuals (or about 0.39% of the population) who were Jewish, and 8 (or about 0.39% of the population) who were Islamic. There were 7 individuals who were Buddhist, 1 individual who was Hindu and 1 individual who belonged to another church. 321 (or about 15.84% of the population) belonged to no church, are agnostic or atheist, and 31 individuals (or about 1.53% of the population) did not answer the question.

== Education ==
In Pfeffingen about 845 or (41.7%) of the population have completed non-mandatory upper secondary education, and 475 or (23.4%) have completed additional higher education (either university or a Fachhochschule). Of the 475 who completed tertiary schooling, 66.7% were Swiss men, 22.1% were Swiss women, 7.2% were non-Swiss men and 4.0% were non-Swiss women.

As of 2000, there were 17 students in Pfeffingen who came from another municipality, while 220 residents attended schools outside the municipality.

== Sports ==
Pfeffingen is home to Sm’Aesch Pfeffingen, a team that plays at the top national level in the Swiss Women's Volleyball League.
