= Neu-Homburg Castle =

Castle in Läufelfingen, Switzerland

- Läufelfingen
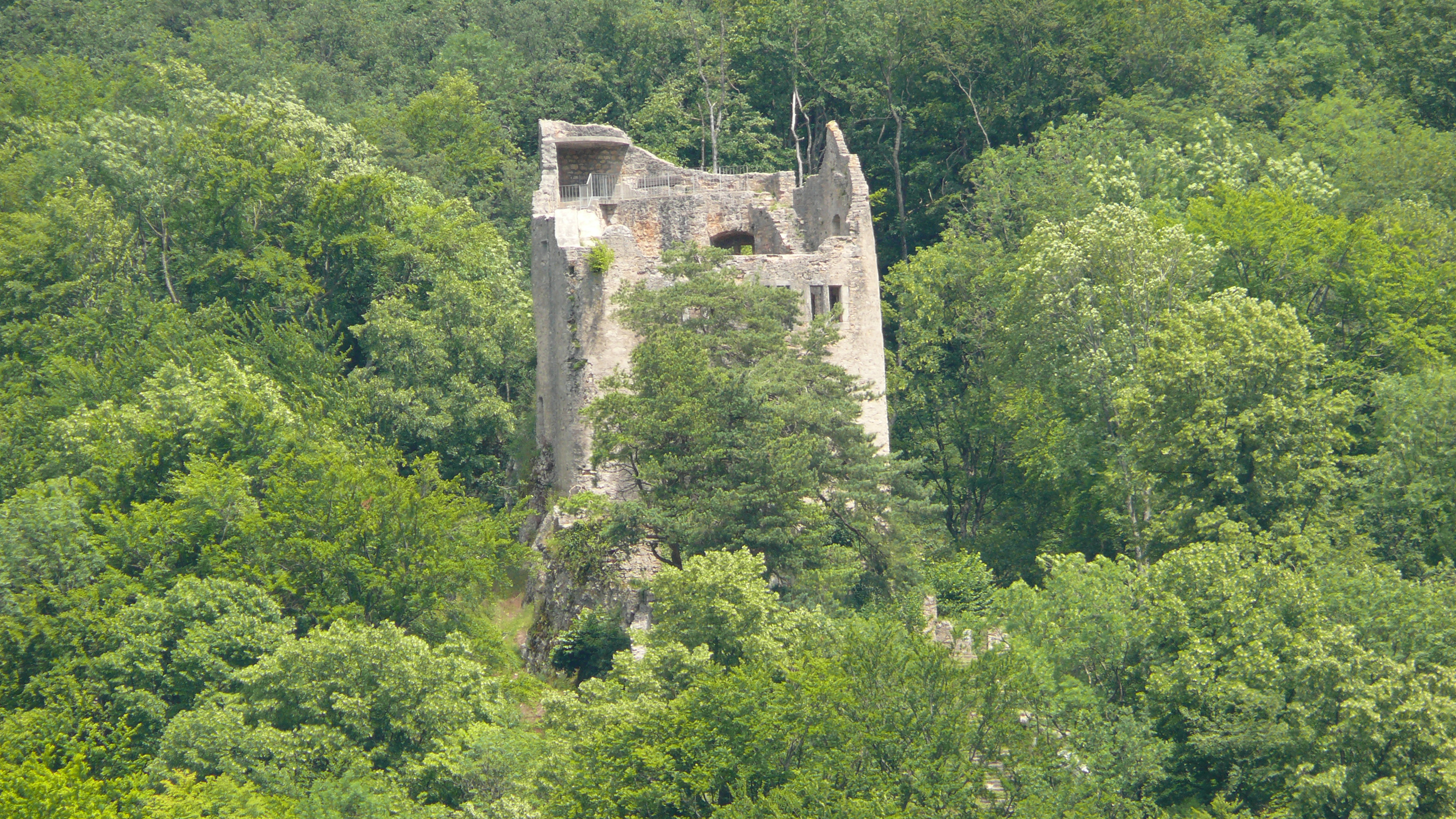
- Ruins of Homburg Castle

Site information
- Type: hill castle
- Code: CH-BL
- Condition: ruin

Location
- Coordinates: 47°24′10.5″N 7°51′18″E
- Height: 650 m above the sea

Site history
- Built: 1240

Garrison information
- Occupants: counts

Neu-Homburg Castle is a castle in the municipality of Läufelfingen of the Canton of Basel-Country in Switzerland. It is a Swiss heritage site of national significance.

== See also ==
- List of castles in Switzerland
