= Roggenburg, Basel-Country =

Roggenburg
- Municipality
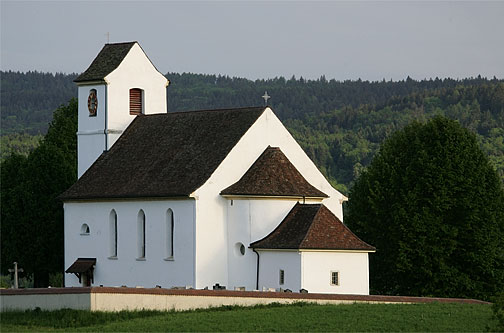

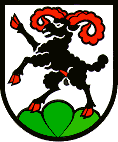
- Coat of arms
- Location of Roggenburg
- Location within Switzerland Location within Canton of Basel-Landschaft
- Coordinates: 47°26′N 7°20′E
- Country: Switzerland
- Canton: Basel-Landschaft
- District: Laufen

Area
  - Total: 6.65 km^{2} (2.57 sq mi)
- Elevation: 438 m (1,437 ft)

Population (December 2005)
  - Total: 262
  - Density: 39.4/km^{2} (102/sq mi)
- Time zone: UTC+01:00 (CET)
  - Summer (DST): UTC+02:00 (CEST)
- Postal code: 2814
- SFOS number: 2790
- ISO 3166 code: CH-BL
- Surrounded by: Ederswiler (JU), Kiffis (FR-68), Kleinlützel (SO), Liesberg, Movelier (JU), Pleigne (JU), Soyhières (JU)
- Website: http://www.roggenburg.ch SFSO statistics

Roggenburg (Swiss Standard German pronunciation: [ˈrɔɡn̩ˌbʊrɡ]; Frainc-Comtou: Rcambèt) is a municipality in the district of Laufen in the canton of Basel-Country in Switzerland.

== History ==
Both Roman coins and the remains of a Roman watchtower have been discovered within the municipality. Roggenburg is first mentioned in 1162 as Rogenberc. The name originates from the Latin word rogus (stake; funeral pyre; stack of logs). Roggenburg belonged to the Count of Thierstein and was then handed over to the Roman Catholic Diocese of Basel in 1454. From 1793 to 1815, it was part of France and was initially part of the département of Mont-Terrible, but it was incorporated with the département of Haut-Rhin in 1800. In 1815, the Congress of Vienna declared that the area would become part the district of Delémont within the Canton of Bern.

As a German-speaking community, Roggenburg spoke out in the Plebiscite of Jura against the creation of the French-speaking canton of Jura. Because Roggenburg was a border municipality in Delémont District, it came into opposition with the neighbouring municipality of Ederswiler over the decision to join the canton of Jura. On 7 September 1975, the inhabitants voted to remain part of the canton of Bern. Therefore, in 1976 the municipality became part of the administrative district of Laufen, which has been an exclave of Bern since Jura was founded on 1 January 1979.

In 1983 and 1989, there were referendums asking the inhabitants of Laufen whether they wanted to become part of the canton of Basel-Country. Roggenburg itself remained of the opinion to stay with Bern, but in the second referendum the overall district voted marginally to join Basel-Country. During the transfer process in 1992, Roggenburg again challenged the decision to defect from Bern. However, such a small community had no persuasive power over the opinion of the rest of the district, and on 1 January 1994 Roggenburg became part of the canton of Basel-Country.

There has been a church in Roggenburg since the 12th century. The current parish church of Sankt Martin was constructed in 1635 in the late gothic style. Baroque features were added in the 18th century. Nearby Ederswiler, in the canton of Jura, is also part of the parish of Roggenburg.

== Coat of arms ==
The blazon of the municipal coat of arms is Argent, a Ram sautant Sable, armed, unguled, and in his virility Gules, on Coupeaux Vert.

== Geography ==
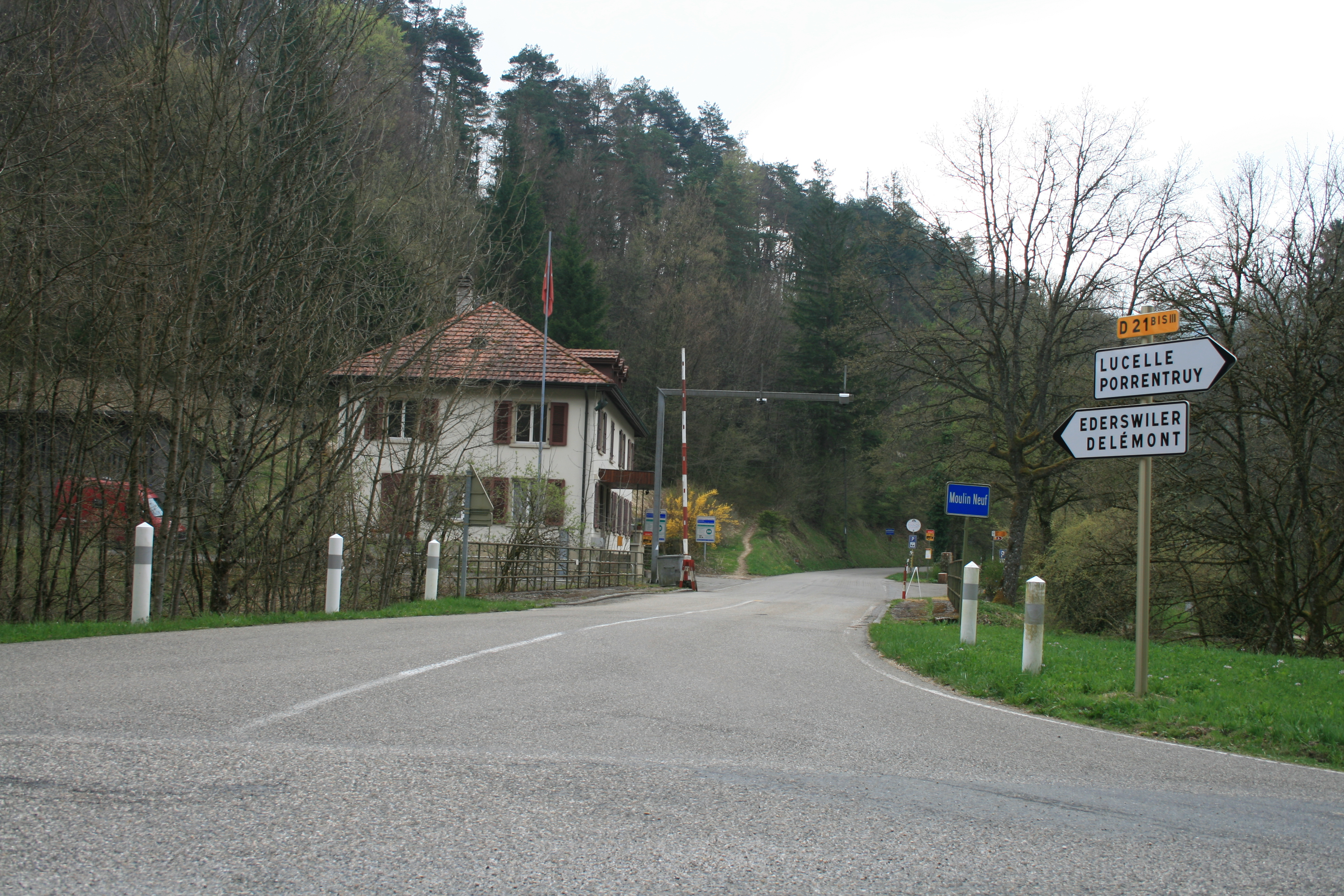
Neumühle / Moulin-Neuf hamlet

Roggenburg, the westernmost municipality of the canton, is a farming village 8 km (5.0 mi) north of Delémont, the principal town of the canton of Jura. To the north, the village confines extend to the bank of the river Lützel (French: Lucelle), in the hilly landscape of the northern Jura Mountains.

Roggenburg has an area, as of 2009, of 6.65 square kilometers (2.57 sq mi). Of this area, 3.34 km^{2} (1.29 sq mi) or 50.2% is used for agricultural purposes, while 3.09 km^{2} (1.19 sq mi) or 46.5% is forested. Of the rest of the land, 0.21 km^{2} (0.081 sq mi) or 3.2% is settled (buildings or roads), 0.01 km^{2} (2.5 acres) or 0.2% is either rivers or lakes.

Of the built up area, housing and buildings made up 2.0% and transportation infrastructure made up 0.8%. Out of the forested land, 43.3% of the total land area is heavily forested and 3.2% is covered with orchards or small clusters of trees. Of the agricultural land, 18.8% is used for growing crops and 24.2% is pastures and 6.3% is used for alpine pastures. All the water in the municipality is flowing water.

The entirety of the northern boundary follows the river Lützel, which also serves as the international boundary between Switzerland and France. From the Lützel valley, the municipality boundary extends to Rieji (693 m (2,274 ft)), the nearest mountain to the village, and Hasenschell (855 m (2,805 ft)), the highest point in the municipality. The western boundary runs along a stream called the Bösen. On the eastern boundary of the municipality, the Lützel drains into the river Birs, a significant tributary of the Rhine.

Roggenburg encompasses the hamlets of Sägemühle (in the Lützel valley) and Neumühle (French Moulin-Neuf), which lies east of the Bösen, as well as numerous individual farmsteads. Roggenburg is in fact an exclave of the canton Basel-Country — it is only connected to the rest of the canton at a single point. Roggenburg's neighbouring municipalities are Pleigne, Ederswiler, Movelier and Soyhières in Jura, Kleinlützel in the canton of Canton of Solothurn and Kiffis in France.

== Demographics ==
Roggenburg has a population (as of June 2021) of 271. As of 2008, 7.1% of the population are resident foreign nationals. Over the last 10 years (1997–2007) the population has changed at a rate of 7.2%.

Most of the population (as of 2000) speaks German (221 or 94.0%), with French being second most common (7 or 3.0%) and Italian language being third (1 or 0.4%).

As of 2008, the gender distribution of the population was 53.2% male and 46.8% female. The population was made up of 257 Swiss citizens (91.8% of the population), and 23 non-Swiss residents (8.2%) Of the population in the municipality 92 or about 39.1% were born in Roggenburg and lived there in 2000. There were 30 or 12.8% who were born in the same canton, while 87 or 37.0% were born somewhere else in Switzerland, and 24 or 10.2% were born outside of Switzerland.

In 2008 there were 2 live births to Swiss citizens and were 2 deaths of Swiss citizens. Ignoring immigration and emigration, the population of Swiss citizens remained the same while the foreign population remained the same. The total Swiss population change in 2008 (from all sources, including moves across municipal borders) was an increase of 1 and the non-Swiss population change was a decrease of 1 people. This represents a population growth rate of 0.0%.

The age distribution, as of 2010, in Roggenburg is; 17 children or 6.1% of the population are between 0 and 6 years old and 43 teenagers or 15.4% are between 7 and 19. Of the adult population, 18 people or 6.4% of the population are between 20 and 29 years old. 37 people or 13.2% are between 30 and 39, 65 people or 23.2% are between 40 and 49, and 58 people or 20.7% are between 50 and 64. The senior population distribution is 31 people or 11.1% of the population are between 65 and 79 years old and there are 11 people or 3.9% who are over 80.

As of 2000, there were 90 people who were single and never married in the municipality. There were 115 married individuals, 16 widows or widowers and 14 individuals who are divorced.

As of 2000, there were 101 private households in the municipality, and an average of 2.3 persons per household. There were 28 households that consist of only one person and 5 households with five or more people. Out of a total of 103 households that answered this question, 27.2% were households made up of just one person and 3 were adults who lived with their parents. Of the rest of the households, there are 33 married couples without children, 30 married couples with children There were 6 single parents with a child or children. There was 1 household that was made up unrelated people and 2 households that were made some sort of institution or another collective housing.

In 2000 there were 74 single family homes (or 67.3% of the total) out of a total of 110 inhabited buildings. There were 14 multi-family buildings (12.7%), along with 19 multi-purpose buildings that were mostly used for housing (17.3%) and 3 other use buildings (commercial or industrial) that also had some housing (2.7%). Of the single family homes 14 were built before 1919, while 14 were built between 1990 and 2000.

In 2000 there were 136 apartments in the municipality. The most common apartment size was 4 rooms of which there were 45. There were 3 single room apartments and 39 apartments with five or more rooms. Of these apartments, a total of 101 apartments (74.3% of the total) were permanently occupied, while 25 apartments (18.4%) were seasonally occupied and 10 apartments (7.4%) were empty. As of 2007, the construction rate of new housing units was 0 new units per 1000 residents. The vacancy rate for the municipality, in 2008, was 0%.

The historical population is given in the following chart:

== Politics ==
In the 2007 federal election the most popular party was the SVP which received 47.32% of the vote. The next three most popular parties were the FDP (16.52%), the CVP (15.4%) and the SP (10.49%). In the federal election, a total of 76 votes were cast, and the voter turnout was 33.9%.

== Economy ==
As of 2007, Roggenburg had an unemployment rate of 2.56%. As of 2005, there were 38 people employed in the primary economic sector and about 14 businesses involved in this sector. 4 people were employed in the secondary sector and there were 3 businesses in this sector. 9 people were employed in the tertiary sector, with 3 businesses in this sector. There were 128 residents of the municipality who were employed in some capacity, of which females made up 38.3% of the workforce.

In 2008 the total number of full-time equivalent jobs was 34. The number of jobs in the primary sector was 21, all of which were in agriculture. The number of jobs in the secondary sector was 6, all of which were in construction. The number of jobs in the tertiary sector was 7. In the tertiary sector; 3 or 42.9% were in wholesale or retail sales or the repair of motor vehicles, 2 or 28.6% were in the movement and storage of goods, 1 or 14.3% were in a hotel or restaurant, 2 or 28.6% were in education.

In 2000, there were 5 workers who commuted into the municipality and 92 workers who commuted away. The municipality is a net exporter of workers, with about 18.4 workers leaving the municipality for every one entering. Of the working population, 13.3% used public transportation to get to work, and 58.6% used a private car.

The municipality is dominated by agriculture. There are very few jobs in the village that are not connected with agriculture. Consequently, 60% of the residents who work commute to other areas. Roggenburg plays host annually to an international motocross race.

== Religion ==
From the 2000 census, 151 or 64.3 percent were Roman Catholic, while 39 or 16.6 percent belonged to the Swiss Reformed Church. Of the rest of the population, there were two individuals who belonged to the Christian Catholic Church, and there was one individual who belonged to another Christian church. One individual was Hindu. A total of 37 (or about 15.74 percent of the population) belonged to no church, were agnostic or atheist; and three individuals did not answer the question.

== Education ==
In Roggenburg about 95 or (40.4%) of the population have completed non-mandatory upper secondary education, and 16 or (6.8%) have completed additional higher education (either university or a Fachhochschule). Of the 16 who completed tertiary schooling, 62.5% were Swiss men, 25.0% were Swiss women. As of 2000, there were 1 students in Roggenburg who came from another municipality, while 9 residents attended schools outside the municipality.

== Transport ==
The municipality lies far from any major roads. The principal access road runs through the Lütze valley into French territory. Roggenburg is served by public transport both from Laufen and from Delémont via Movelier.
