= Pleigne =

- Municipality
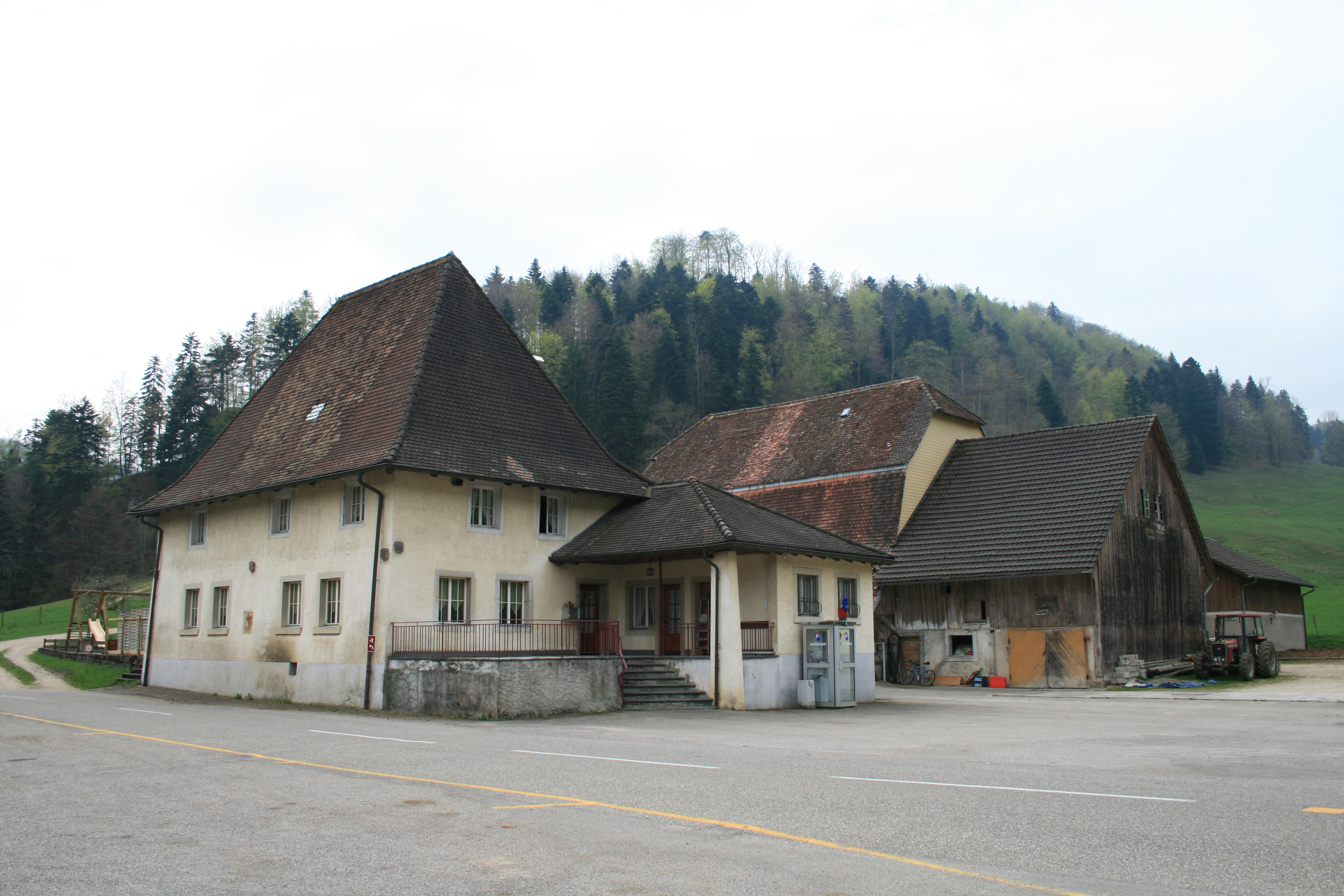
- A farm house near Lucelle village

- Flag Coat of arms
- Location of Pleigne
- Location within Switzerland Location within Canton of Jura
- Coordinates: 47°24′N 07°17′E
- Country: Switzerland
- Canton: Jura
- District: Delémont

Government
  - Executive: Conseil communal with 5 members
  - Mayor: Maire; Stéphane Brosy (as of 2026)

Area
  - Total: 17.83 km^{2} (6.88 sq mi)
- Elevation: 809 m (2,654 ft)

Population (2020)
  - Total: 349
  - Density: 19.6/km^{2} (50.7/sq mi)
- Time zone: UTC+01:00 (CET)
  - Summer (DST): UTC+02:00 (CEST)
- Postal code: 2807
- SFOS number: 6719
- ISO 3166 code: CH-JU
- Surrounded by: Charmoille, Pleujouse, Bourrignon, Mettembert, Movelier, Ederswiler, Roggenburg (BL), Lucelle (F), Kiffis (F)
- Website: www.pleigne.ch

Pleigne is a municipality in the district of Delémont in the canton of Jura in Switzerland.

== History ==
Aerial view (1950)

Pleigne is first mentioned in 1179 as Plenna. The municipality was formerly known by its German name Pleen, however, that name is no longer used.

== Geography ==
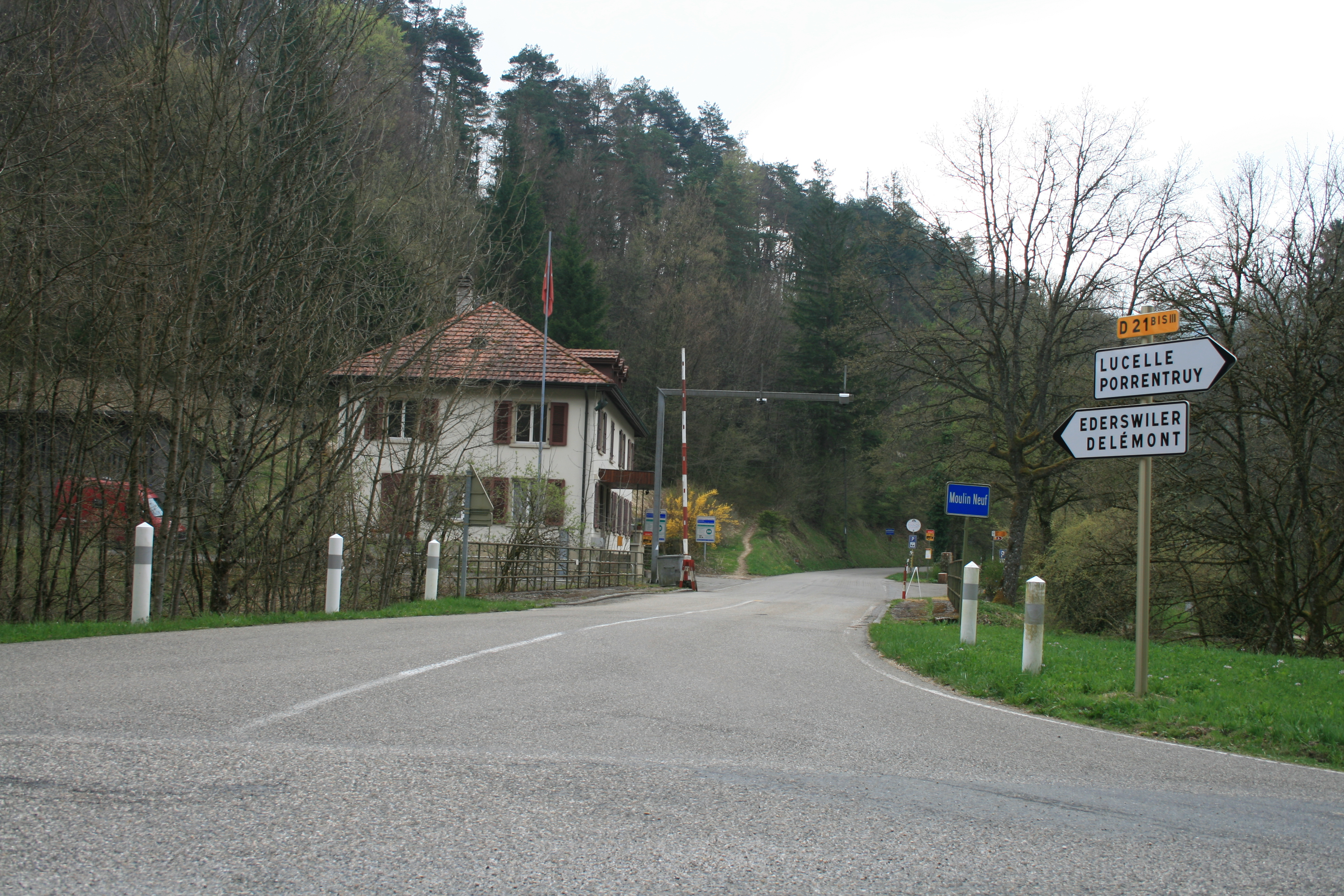
Moulin-Neuf

Pleigne has an area of 17.84 km^{2} (6.89 sq mi). Of this area, 8.42 km^{2} (3.25 mi^{2}) or 47.2% is used for agricultural purposes, while 8.78 km^{2} (3.39 mi^{2}) or 49.2% is forested. Of the rest of the land, 0.54 km^{2} (0.21 mi^{2}) or 3.0% is settled (buildings or roads), 0.08 km^{2} (20 acres) or 0.4% is either rivers or lakes and 0.02 km^{2} (4.9 acres) or 0.1% is unproductive land.

Of the built up area, housing and buildings made up 1.6% and transportation infrastructure made up 1.2%. Out of the forested land, 46.1% of the total land area is heavily forested and 3.1% is covered with orchards or small clusters of trees. Of the agricultural land, 17.4% is used for growing crops and 11.0% is pastures and 18.5% is used for alpine pastures. All the water in the municipality is in lakes.

The municipality is located in the Delemont district, on a terrace at an elevation of 809 m (2,654 ft). The village is north-west of Delemont. It consists of the village of Pleigne, numerous former farms of Lucelle/Lützel Monastery, the Gasthaus Moulin-Neuf, the 18th century mill at Bavelier and the archeological Löwenburg site.

== Coat of arms ==
The blazon of the municipal coat of arms is Gules, between three Mullets of Five Or a Sword and a Staff Argent in Saltire and in chief on an Escutcheon of the last a Jay statant lined Sable.

== Demographics ==
Pleigne has a population (as of December 2020) of 349. As of 2008, 2.6% of the population are resident foreign nationals. Over the last 10 years (2000–2010) the population has changed at a rate of 0%. Migration accounted for -3.6%, while births and deaths accounted for 2.8%.

Most of the population (as of 2000) speaks French (347 or 85.0%) as their first language, German is the second most common (58 or 14.2%) and Dutch is the third (2 or 0.5%).

As of 2008, the population was 48.3% male and 51.7% female. The population was made up of 185 Swiss men (47.3% of the population) and 4 (1.0%) non-Swiss men. There were 194 Swiss women (49.6%) and 8 (2.0%) non-Swiss women. Of the population in the municipality, 200 or about 49.0% were born in Pleigne and lived there in 2000. There were 104 or 25.5% who were born in the same canton, while 69 or 16.9% were born somewhere else in Switzerland, and 15 or 3.7% were born outside of Switzerland.

As of 2000, children and teenagers (0–19 years old) make up 29.2% of the population, while adults (20–64 years old) make up 59.6% and seniors (over 64 years old) make up 11.3%.

As of 2000, there were 187 people who were single and never married in the municipality. There were 188 married individuals, 21 widows or widowers and 12 individuals who are divorced.

As of 2000, there were 141 private households in the municipality, and an average of 2.8 persons per household. There were 30 households that consist of only one person and 25 households with five or more people. In 2000, a total of 137 apartments (78.7% of the total) were permanently occupied, while 29 apartments (16.7%) were seasonally occupied and 8 apartments (4.6%) were empty. As of 2009, the construction rate of new housing units was 2.6 new units per 1000 residents. The vacancy rate for the municipality, in 2010, was 1.65%.

The historical population is given in the following chart:

== Heritage sites of national significance ==
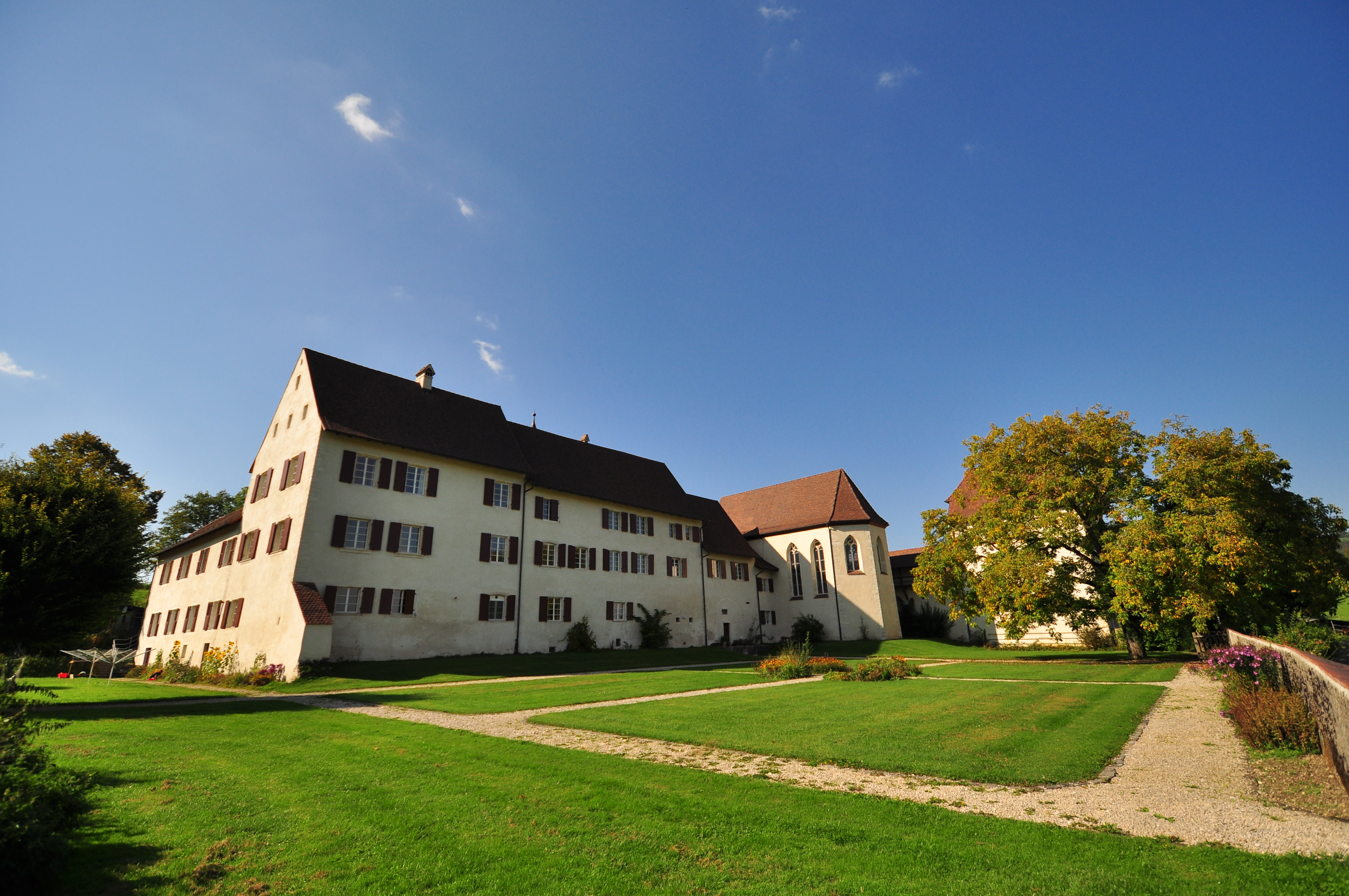
Former priory of Löwenburg

The former Priory of Löwenburg and the Paleolithic settlement and Neolithic flint mine at Löwenburg are listed as Swiss heritage site of national significance. The entire Löwenburg area is part of the Inventory of Swiss Heritage Sites.

== Politics ==
In the 2007 federal election the most popular party was the CVP which received 32.31% of the vote. The next three most popular parties were the SPS (23.46%), the FDP (21.15%) and the SVP (20.38%). In the federal election, a total of 133 votes were cast, and the voter turnout was 42.9%.

== Economy ==
As of 2010, Pleigne had an unemployment rate of 3.6%. As of 2008, there were 51 people employed in the primary economic sector and about 16 businesses involved in this sector. 33 people were employed in the secondary sector and there were 3 businesses in this sector. 19 people were employed in the tertiary sector, with 9 businesses in this sector. There were 217 residents of the municipality who were employed in some capacity, of which females made up 40.1% of the workforce.

In 2008 the total number of full-time equivalent jobs was 80. The number of jobs in the primary sector was 35, all of which were in agriculture. The number of jobs in the secondary sector was 32 of which 26 or (81.3%) were in manufacturing and 6 (18.8%) were in construction. The number of jobs in the tertiary sector was 13. In the tertiary sector; 3 or 23.1% were in wholesale or retail sales or the repair of motor vehicles, 5 or 38.5% were in the movement and storage of goods, 5 or 38.5% were in a hotel or restaurant, and .

In 2000, there were 38 workers who commuted into the municipality and 138 workers who commuted away. The municipality is a net exporter of workers, with about 3.6 workers leaving the municipality for every one entering. About 21.1% of the workforce coming into Pleigne are coming from outside Switzerland. Of the working population, 9.7% used public transportation to get to work, and 55.8% used a private car.

== Religion ==
From the 2000 census, 305 or 74.8% were Roman Catholic, while 35 or 8.6% belonged to the Swiss Reformed Church. Of the rest of the population, there were 34 individuals (or about 8.33% of the population) who belonged to another Christian church. There were 3 (or about 0.74% of the population) who were Islamic. 26 (or about 6.37% of the population) belonged to no church, are agnostic or atheist, and 22 individuals (or about 5.39% of the population) did not answer the question.

== Education ==
In Pleigne about 139 or (34.1%) of the population have completed non-mandatory upper secondary education, and 33 or (8.1%) have completed additional higher education (either university or a Fachhochschule). Of the 33 who completed tertiary schooling, 60.6% were Swiss men, 27.3% were Swiss women.

The Canton of Jura school system provides two year of non-obligatory Kindergarten, followed by six years of Primary school. This is followed by three years of obligatory lower Secondary school where the students are separated according to ability and aptitude. Following the lower Secondary students may attend a three or four year optional upper Secondary school followed by some form of Tertiary school or they may enter an apprenticeship.

During the 2009-10 school year, there were no students attending school in Pleigne.

As of 2000, there were 9 students in Pleigne who came from another municipality, while 41 residents attended schools outside the municipality.
