= Laufental change of canton =

Legal and political dispute in Switzerland

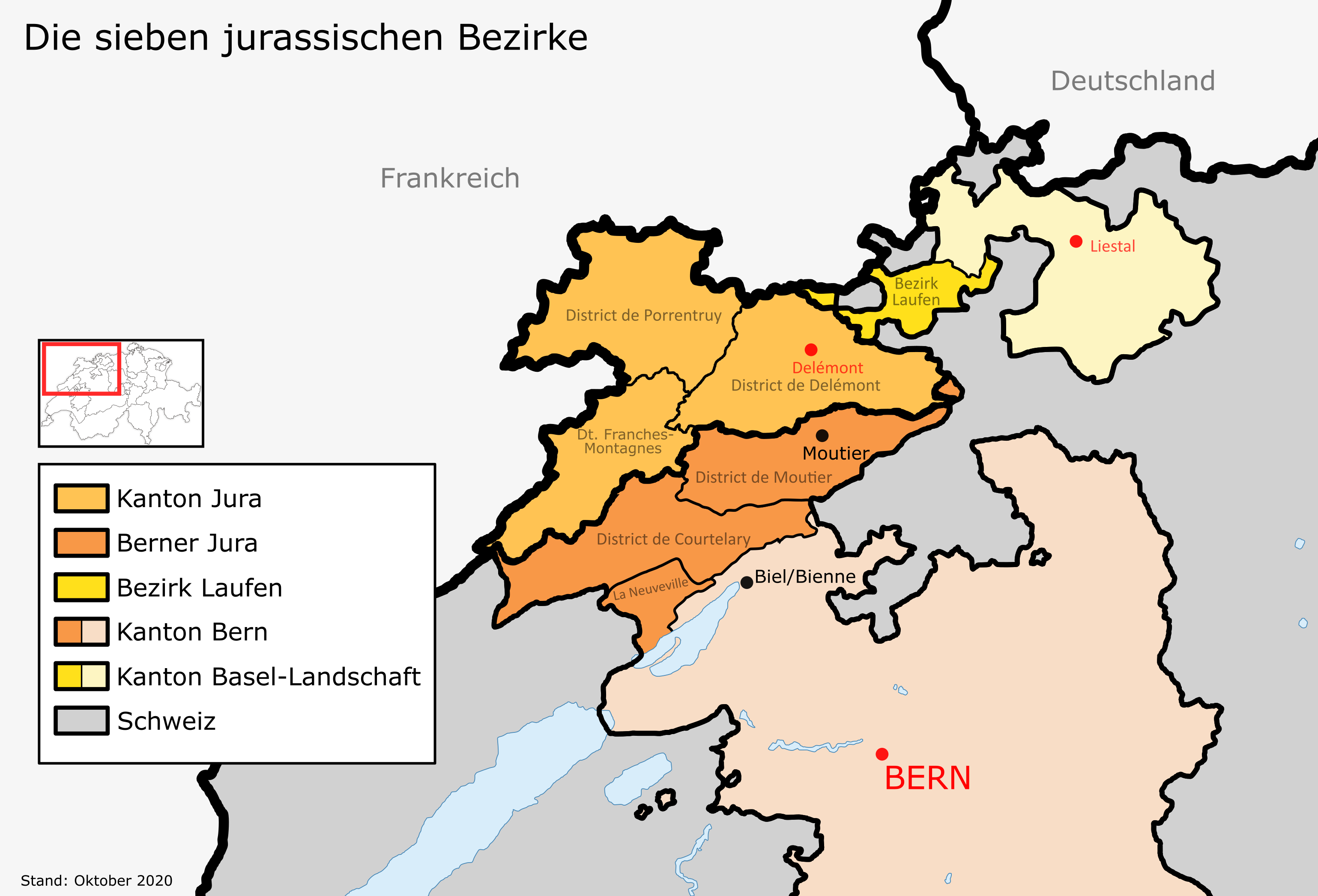
The seven Jura districts (Laufental in yellow)

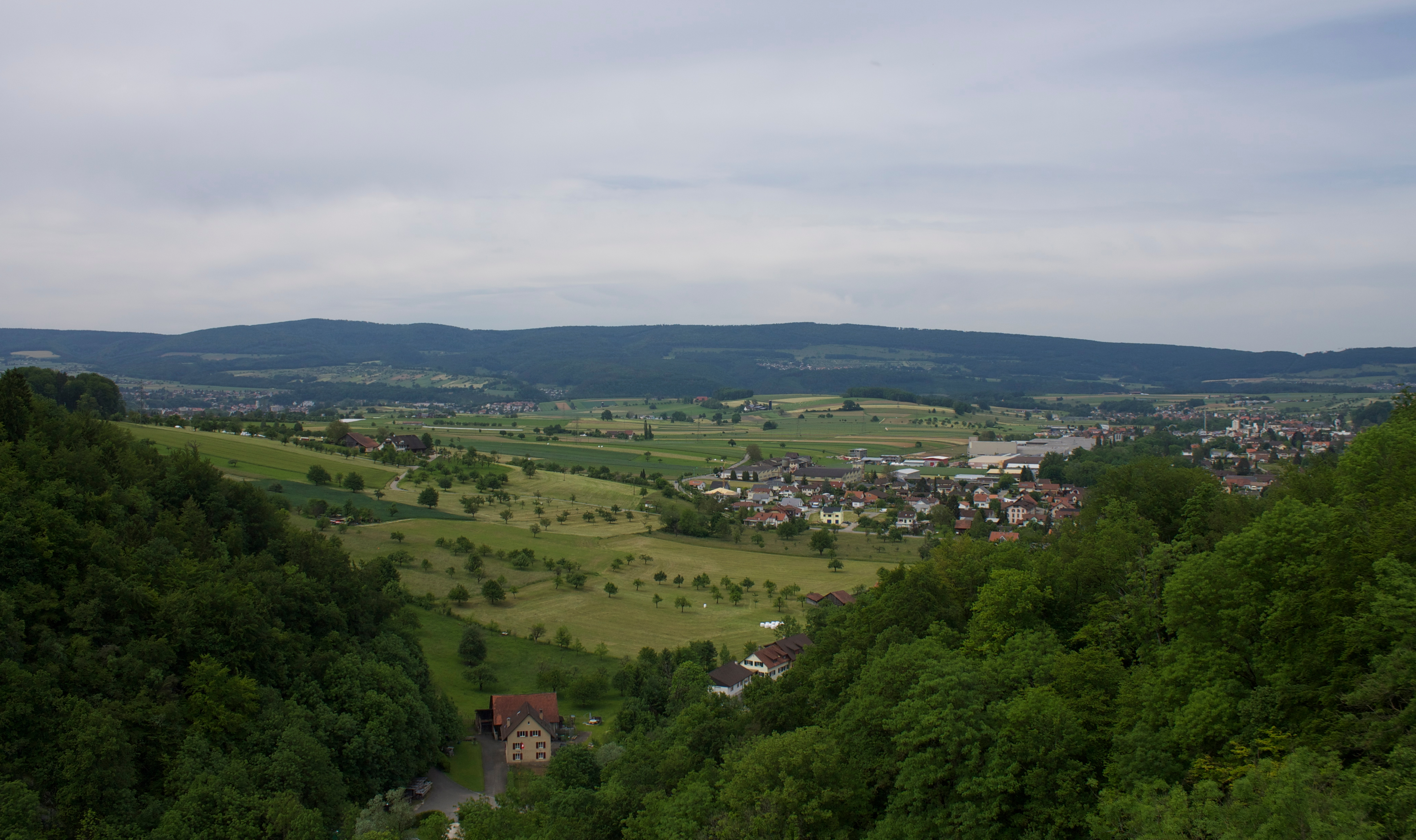
View towards Laufental from Neu-Thierstein Castle. The towns of Laufen, Dittingen, Blauen and Brislach, among others, are visible.

The transfer of Laufen District in north-western Switzerland from the canton of Bern to the canton of Basel-Landschaft in 1994 was preceded by decades of protracted political and legal disputes, also known as the Laufental question.

The district's cantonal affiliation was closely linked to the Jura question. Like the Jura region, the valley of Laufen (German: Laufental) once belonged to the Prince-Bishopric of Basel and only became part of Bern in 1815 after the Congress of Vienna. The region had little influence on cantonal politics, while economic and cultural ties with the Basel metropolitan area remained close. The same amendment to the Bernese cantonal constitution that enabled the founding of the canton of Jura in the nearby French-speaking areas after the Jura plebiscites in 1979 granted the district, which had become an exclave, the right to decide whether to join one of its neighboring cantons.

In 1978, the people of Laufental decided to initiate the procedure, and in 1980 they chose the canton of Basel-Landschaft as their preferred accession option (other options would have been the cantons of Basel-Stadt and Solothurn). On September 11, 1983, however, they voted against the change of canton with 56.7% of the votes. When the Bernese financial affair was uncovered in 1984, it came to light that the cantonal authorities had massively influenced opinion-forming through secret illegal payments to the Aktion bernisches Laufental (Bernese Laufental Action) campaign. In 1988, the Federal Supreme Court upheld a constitutional complaint by the separatist Laufentaler Bewegung and declared the result of the vote invalid. The repeat of the vote on November 12, 1989, resulted in a majority of 51.7% in favour of the change of canton. In 1991, Basel-Landschaft agreed to the incorporation of Laufental, and in 1993 the people and cantons also gave their approval in a federal referendum. The transfer finally took place on January 1, 1994.

== Laufental in the prince-bishopric of Basel ==
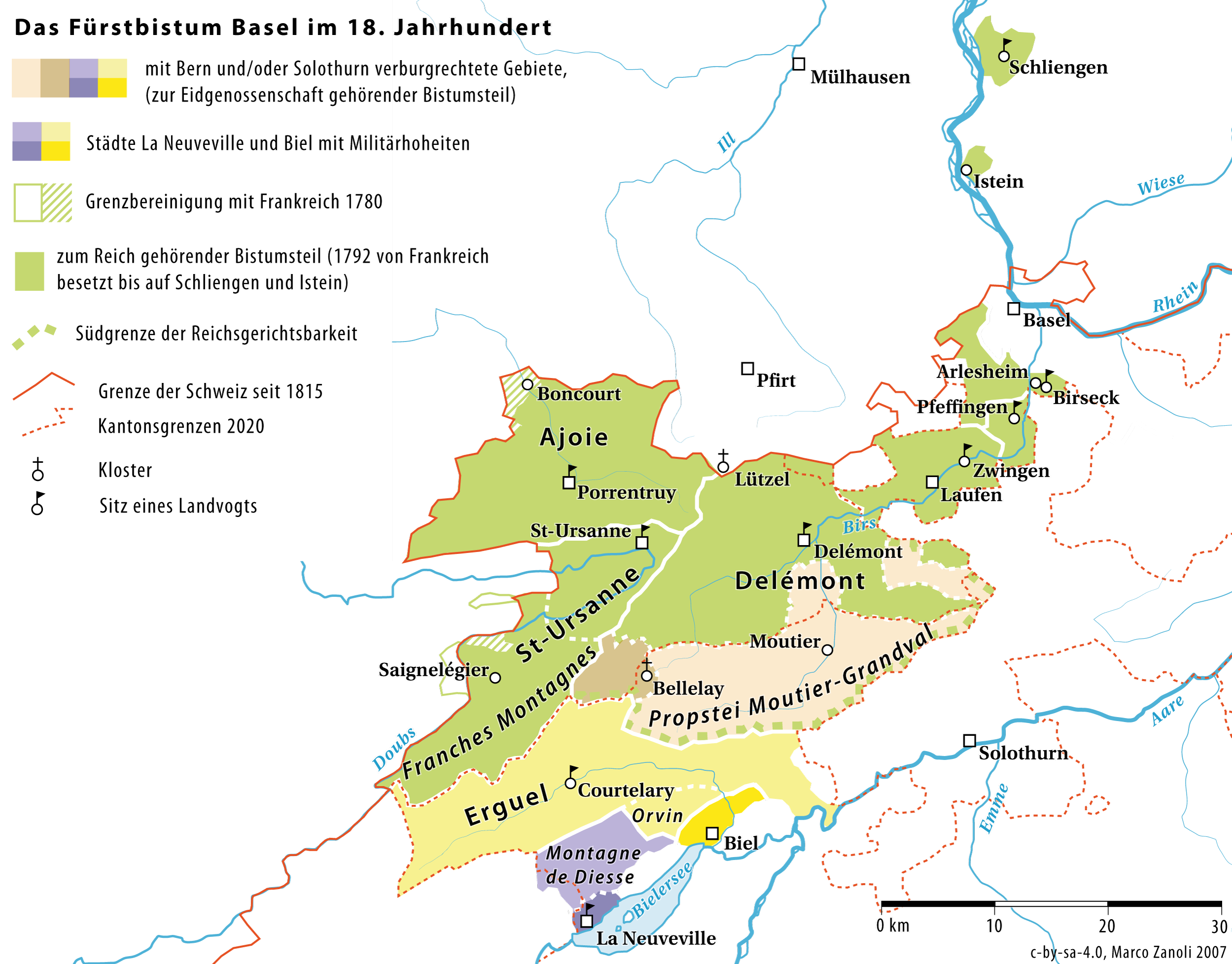
Territory of the Prince-Bishopric of Basel in the 18th century

In the Middle Ages, the Laufental valley came under the influence of the bishops of Basel. In 1006, Henry II granted the villages of Duggingen and Grellingen to the Prince-Bishopric of Basel. In 1141, the Saint Blaise Abbey ceded a manor comprising Laufen, Röschenz, Wahlen and Zwingen. In 1269, the prince-bishopric acquired the lordship of Burg im Leimental from the Habsburgs, the village of Liesberg from the County of Ferrette in 1271 and the village of Roggenburg from the Thiersteiners in 1454. Finally, in 1462, Blauen, Brislach, Dittingen and Nenzlingen were added from the Ramstein inheritance. There were close ties with the prince-bishop's bailiwicks of Birseck and Pfeffingen, as well as with the city of Basel. After the French Republic occupied the north of the prince-bishopric in 1792, revolutionary forces proclaimed the Rauracian Republic. In 1793, France annexed its sister republic, which now formed the department of Mont-Terrible. Despite territorial expansions, it remained the smallest of all the departments and was absorbed into the department of Haut-Rhin in 1800. In the latter, the municipalities belonged to the canton of Laufen (with the exception of Roggenburg in the canton of Delémont).

Coalition troops conquered the former prince-bishopric in 1813. After the Treaty of Paris restored the borders of 1792, Governor Conrad Karl Friedrich von Andlau-Birseck continued to administer the area provisionally. The Laufentalers petitioned to be annexed to the Canton of Basel. The Congress of Vienna ignored this request, as Prince Metternich proposed that the Canton of Bern be compensated for the loss of its subject territories in Vaud and Aargau with the former prince-bishopric; Basel was also to receive a share. It is assumed that the diplomats were more confident that the Bernese could reliably defend Switzerland's north-western border than the geographically exposed Baslers, which is why they drew the border at Angenstein Castle above the Birs on 20 March 1815. Another common explanation is that they simply had inaccurate knowledge of local conditions. The deeds of union formalized the division of the territory on December 15, 1815. This split the bailiwick of Pfeffingen in two: Aesch and Pfeffingen together with the Birseck went to Basel, Duggingen and Grellingen together with the Laufental went to Bern. This division was in line with the wishes of the Reformed inhabitants of Basel, who distrusted the Catholics and therefore did not want to take in too many of them.

== The Laufental in the canton of Bern ==
The integration of the Laufental into the Canton of Bern, which was also Reformed, proved to be difficult, which was demonstrated in particular by the Baden Articles (1836) and the Kulturkampf (1873–1880), when the cantonal government took action against Catholic priests loyal to the Roman Catholic Church. Nevertheless, the people of Laufental did not seek separation, but rather the preservation of their distinct characteristics and greater autonomy within the canton. In the early years, the Laufental belonged administratively to the French-speaking district of Delémont, but despite sharing a Catholic majority, it did not feel adequately represented. Separatist efforts were nevertheless limited, apart from the actions of Joseph Ferdinand Gerster. When the Bernese cantonal constitution was revised in 1846, the demand for a separate district was granted. Politically, it hardly played a role, as its representation in the cantonal authorities was low and its strongest party, the Catholic Conservatives (CVP from 1970), was of little importance at cantonal level. In the following decades, more and more Bernese moved to Laufental, including civil servants, police officers and teachers. However, cultural and above all economic relations continued to exist predominantly with the Basel area. These became ever closer, especially after the construction of the Jura Railway in the 1870s. The Laufental developed into one of the wealthiest districts in the canton, but relations with Bern remained distant. A hundred years later, the Laufental experienced a significant population surge due to the arrival of commuters who worked in Basel and the surrounding area.

Jura separatism, which flared up again in 1947 after the Moeckli Affair, initially had only a marginal impact on the Laufental. In the early years, the Rassemblement jurassien (RJ) strove for a new canton that would encompass the entire historical Jura, i.e. the area of the former prince-bishopric belonging to the canton of Bern, comprising the districts of Courtelary, Delémont, Franches-Montagnes, La Neuveville, Laufen, Moutier and Porrentruy. Individual prominent Laufental residents actively supported this demand, above all Adolf Walther, the long-serving governor. He was vice-president of the RJ and editor of the separatist magazine Der Laufentaler from 1953 to 1959. On July 5, 1959, the cantonal plebiscite initiative, with which the separatists in the seven Jura districts wanted to bring about a referendum on the establishment of the canton, failed by a clear margin; in the district of Laufen itself, the rejection rate was 73.1%. As a result, the RJ gradually replaced its hitherto purely historical argumentation with an ethnolinguistic strategy that emphasized French ethnicity. For this reason, it gave up its already very vague claim to the Laufental and interest in the Jura question there declined sharply.

== Effects of the Jura plebiscites on the Laufental ==
The situation changed abruptly on September 9, 1969, when the Grand Council of the Canton of Bern approved a proposal by the cantonal executive without a dissenting vote: an amendment to the Bernese cantonal constitution would allow the seven districts to decide whether they wanted to remain part of the Canton of Bern or be part of a new canton to be founded. The Bernese authorities assumed that the district of Laufen would refuse to join a French-speaking canton and thus become an exclave. They therefore felt compelled to grant it a separate right of self-determination, which would allow voters to decide whether to join a neighboring canton in north-western Switzerland. The journalist Heinz Däpp argues that most Bernese politicians at the time regarded the Laufental as merely an appendage to the highly controversial Jura issue and were only interested in the distant district in this context. On the other hand, in the numerous debates, the people of Laufental had never played a noticeable role in shaping Bernese Jura policy and had shown a demonstrative lack of interest. The district could not be categorized as either "evil separatists" or "good Bern loyalists" and was therefore declared a special case. The official stance of explaining the right to self-determination with the exclave situation was only a pretext to influence opinions in the Jura; the Laufental people themselves had never been asked beforehand. The March 1, 1970 referendum on the constitutional amendment resulted in an approval rate of 93.3% canton-wide and 88.7% in the district of Laufen.

In the first Jura plebiscite on June 23, 1974, the people of Laufental had to vote against the creation of the canton of Jura in order to keep the option of joining another canton open. Bern may have hoped that the votes of the Laufentalers would thwart Jura's efforts to gain autonomy, but this did not succeed. Although 74.2% of voters in Laufental rejected the proposal, 51.9% of voters across all districts voted in favor. On September 18, 1974, the Laufental District Commission was formed on a voluntary basis. It was chaired by governor Jacques Gubler and prepared the second Jura plebiscite. In order not to be part of the new canton, the districts that rejected the proposal had to submit popular initiatives signed by at least one fifth of the voters. In the districts of Courtelary, La Neuveville and Moutier, the anti-separatist Force démocratique organized the collection of signatures, while in the district of Laufen, the district commission did so. It submitted the initiative on February 24, 1975, with 3,312 valid signatures. According to Gubler, it was "not responsible for making any decisions about the political future of our valley; however, it had to lay the groundwork so that the political decision could be made by the citizens entitled to vote." On September 14, 1975, 94.6% of Laufental residents voted yes to the question "Do you want the district of Laufen to remain part of the canton of Bern, subject to annexation to a neighbouring canton?"

In the district of Delémont, there were two German-speaking municipalities, Roggenburg and Ederswiler, which also did not want to become part of the Canton of Jura. Roggenburg had the opportunity to take part in the third Jura plebiscite, as it borders the Laufental municipality of Liesberg at its easternmost point. One fifth of those entitled to vote had to support a communal popular initiative. On October 1, 1975, the municipality submitted 103 valid signatures to the Bernese state chancellery, which corresponded to three quarters of the voters. On October 19, Roggenburg decided by 97 votes to 10 to become part of the Laufen district and thus remain Bernese. The territorial change came into force on January 1, 1976. Although Ederswiler also voted in favour of a change of district a week after Roggenburg, this vote was purely consultative and was never carried out, as the municipality had not bordered a district remaining with Bern before Roggenburg's change. To this day, Ederswiler is the only German-speaking municipality in the canton of Jura.

== Initiation of the follow-up procedure ==
On November 19, 1975, based on the constitutional amendment, the Grand Council unanimously passed the "Law on the initiation and implementation of the procedure for the annexation of the Laufental to a neighboring canton." This constituted the district – unique in Switzerland – as a public-law regional authority which was allowed to negotiate and make decisions independently on the issue of a possible change of canton. In order to be able to exercise the right to self-determination and to structure the divergent opinions into comprehensible and transparent decision-making bases, it was necessary to transform the district commission into a democratically legitimized body. Bern's influence was to be limited to the clarification of details, particularly with regard to the separation of assets. The first popular election of the 26 commission members took place on April 4, 1976.

In May 1976, the district commission contacted the cantons of Basel-Landschaft, Basel-Stadt, and Solothurn for the first time. Initially, only Basel-Stadt showed any real interest in accepting the district, which put the other two under pressure. Basel-Landschaft was concerned that the reunification of the two Basel cantons, which had been rejected in 1969, could become an issue again. Solothurn, on the other hand, feared that its exclaves Kleinlützel and Leimental might also wish to secede. Overall, however, all sides considered the talks to be positive. Solothurn and Basel-Landschaft promised to accept the Laufental as an equal district. The situation was more complex in Basel-Stadt, which is not directly adjacent and where the city and cantonal administrations are identical. The Laufental was to be granted extensive self-government rights for all its own concerns, for example in the areas of agriculture, hunting and fishing, local and regional planning, jurisdiction, and financial municipal autonomy. It would also receive eight or nine seats in the Grand Council of Basel-Stadt, and the district commission would have its own right of initiative.

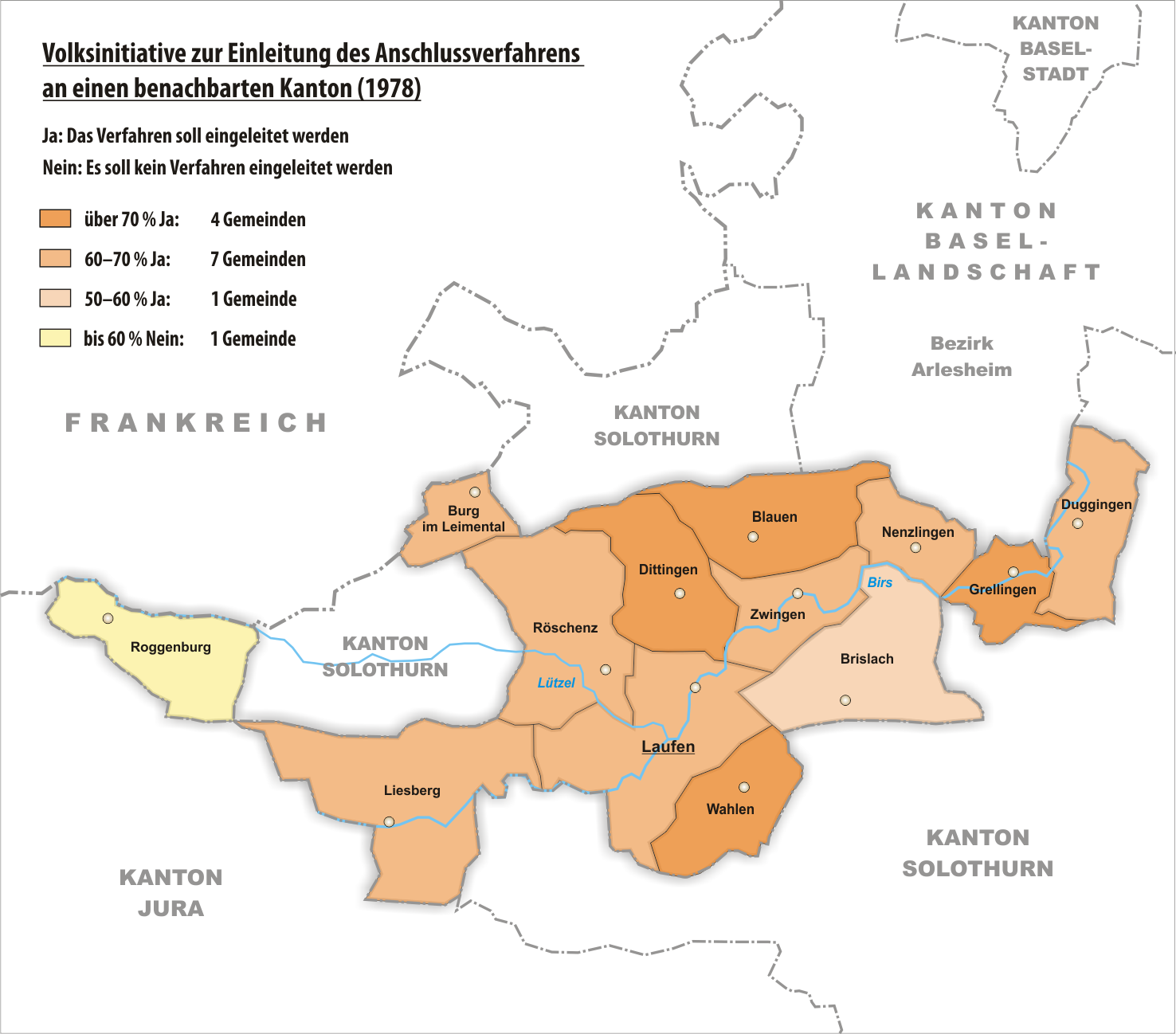
Result of the initiation of the follow-up procedure

In May 1977, the District Commission sent a detailed report to all voters comparing the cantons and providing information on the status of the clarifications. On December 5, the Grand Council passed the "Law on the Participation Rights of the Laufental". If the Laufental were to remain with Bern, the district commission would be renamed the district council and would then represent the interests of the district as a parliament. In addition, Laufental would have the right to be heard on all intercantonal agreements and cantonal matters affecting the district. Again based on the constitutional amendment, the "Yes to the Best Solution" committee, which had been founded shortly before, submitted the "Popular Initiative to Initiate the Process of Joining a Neighboring Canton" on November 15, 1977. Sixty percent of voters signed the petition, three times more than required.

In the months leading up to the vote, two political camps with differing views began to emerge. The "Yes to the Best Solution" committee argued that the people of Laufental should be given the opportunity to obtain details of their neighbors' offers. The "Association for a secure future for the Laufental" was in favor of remaining with Bern, arguing that the future lay in intercantonal cooperation rather than border adjustments. The vote took place on June 18, 1978, and resulted in a clear majority: with a turnout of 79.2%, 65.1% of those who voted were in favor of the district commission conducting official negotiations with the neighboring cantons. Only Roggenburg, which had become part of the district of Laufen two and a half years previously, voted against. The supporters interpreted the result as a clear signal that the Laufental wanted to separate from the canton of Bern. Those loyal to Bern countered that the majority wanted to keep all options open, but that this was not synonymous with a desire to change cantons.

== Basel-Landschaft chosen as the target canton ==
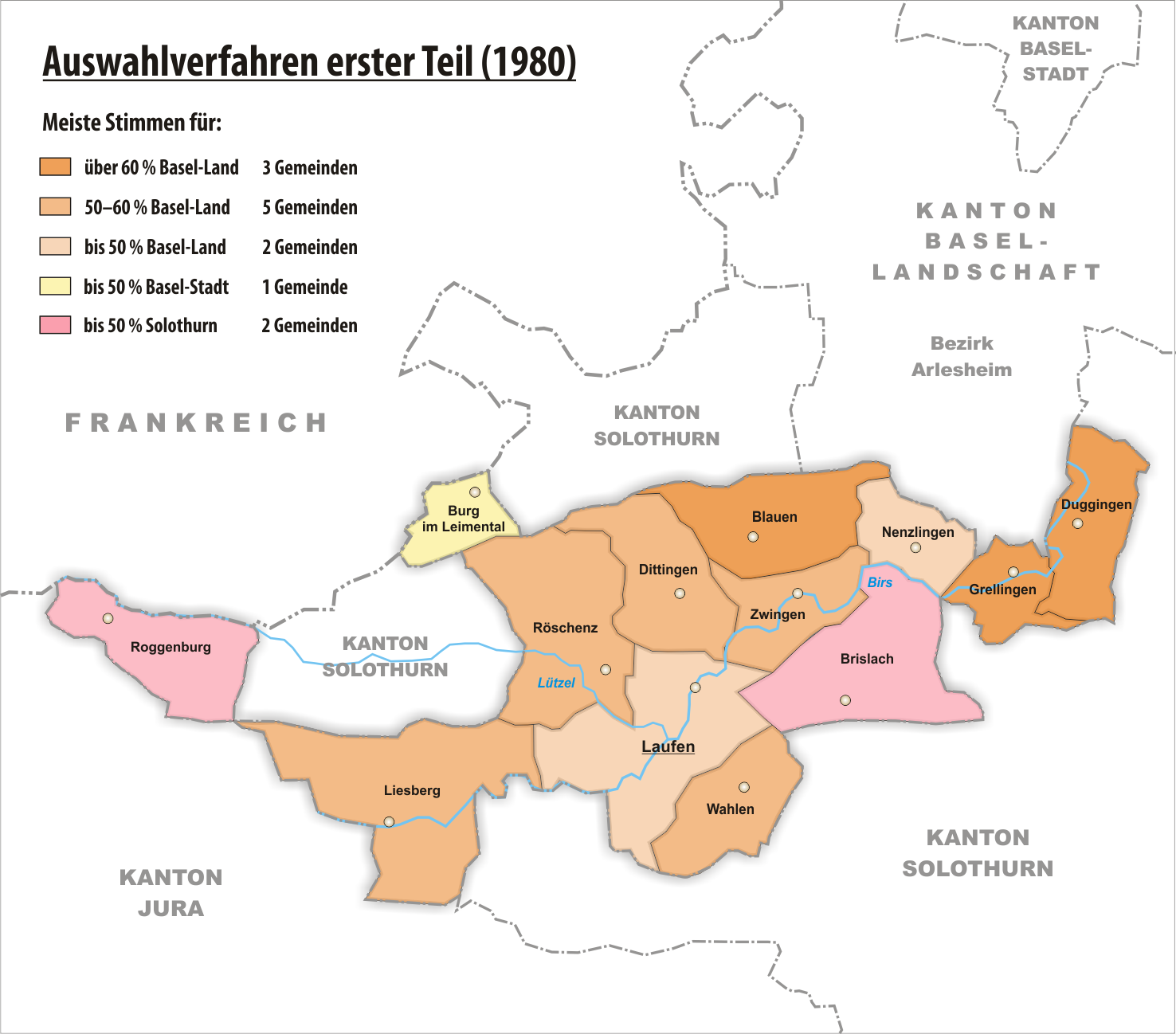
Majorities for Baselland, Basel-Stadt, and Solothurn

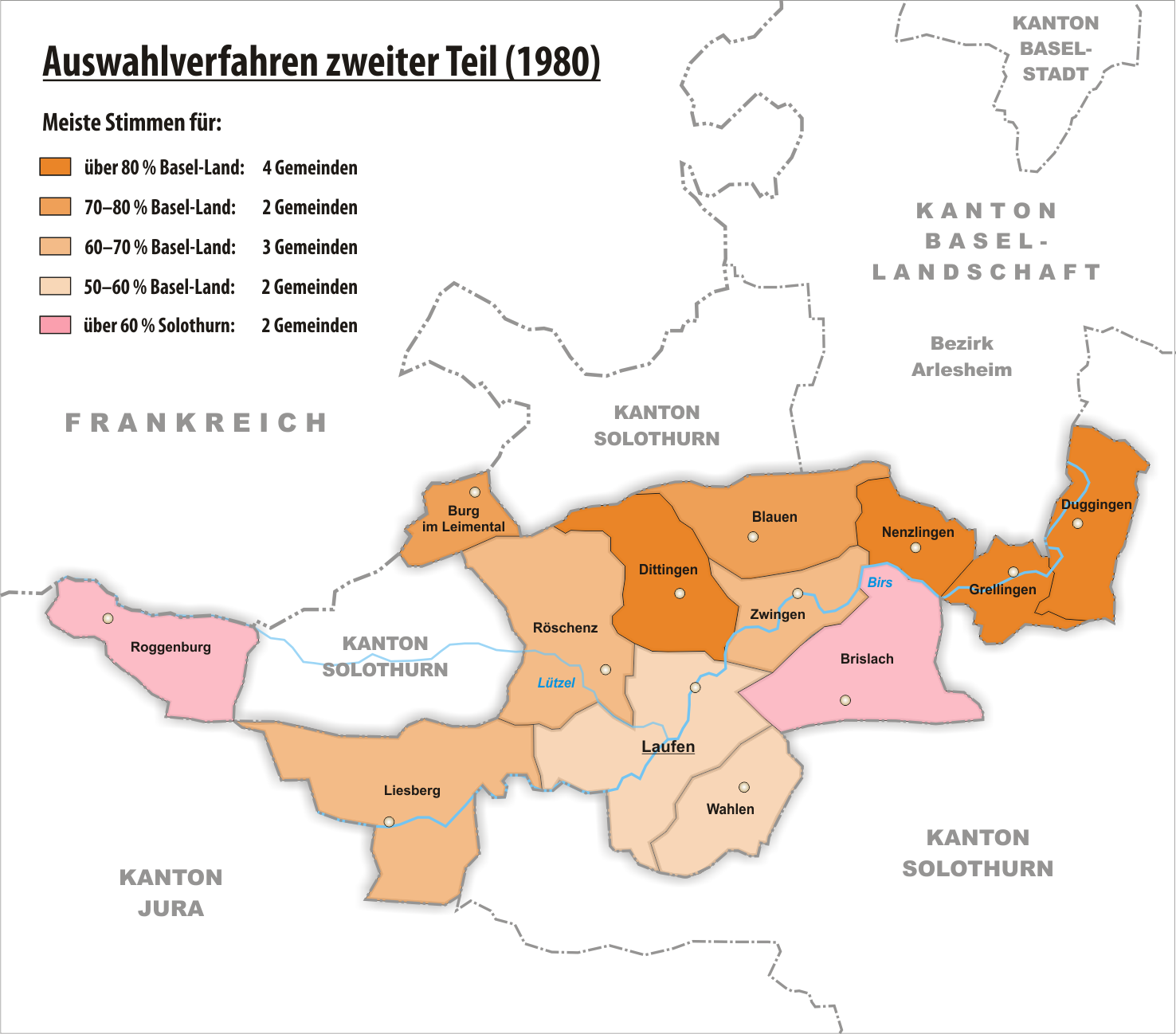
Majorities for Baselland and Solothurn

The district commission asked all three cantonal governments whether they would be prepared to hold a consultative vote before the target canton was determined. This would give the people of Laufental the opportunity to find out the opinion of the people in advance and thus eliminate any uncertainties. Basel-Landschaft and Solothurn initially agreed to this, but later withdrew their consent due to legal and political concerns. The Basel-Stadt cantonal government in turn had a constitutional amendment drafted that would grant Laufental a special statute. The Basel-Stadt Grand Council unanimously approved it in February 1979. On May 20, 1979, however, the voters of Basel-Stadt showed little interest in the Laufental. Only 56.7% voted in favor of the constitutional amendment, with a turnout of 37.3%. Opponents of the bill had pointed out in particular that the Laufental would be given greater autonomy than the Basel-Stadt municipalities of Riehen and Bettingen. In Laufental itself, the impression prevailed that the decision-making process had been made more difficult.

The target canton was chosen in two stages in the first quarter of 1980. While the cantons approached were content to provide sober information so as not to give the impression of a "bridal show," the district commission and the "Yes to the Best Solution" committee recommended the canton of Basel-Landschaft. It was young, modern and financially strong, with an industrialized rural structure similar to that of Laufental. Thanks to the many intercantonal partnerships between the two Basel cantons, the Laufental could benefit equally from the services offered by Basel-Stadt. The canton of Basel-Stadt, on the other hand, was undeniably the center of northwestern Switzerland and had adopted a generous special status, but the continuing situation as an exclave and the moderate support of the canton's population spoke against it. Laufental's relationship with the neighboring Schwarzbubenland is very close, especially as three-fifths of it surrounds Laufental and the majority of its population is also Catholic. However, the "geographically sensible solution" should not obscure the fact that there are hardly any similarities or contacts with the rest of the canton of Solothurn beyond the Passwang Pass.

The first vote on January 13, 1980, already ended with a clear victory for Basel-Landschaft. 51.5% of voters were in favor of this canton, while 32.5% voted for Solothurn and 16.0% for Basel-Stadt. Political observers had expected Basel-Landschaft to achieve the best result, but were surprised by the clarity of the outcome. Only Burg im Leimental voted for Basel-Stadt. It was generally assumed that the votes for Solothurn came mainly from those loyal to Bern for strategic reasons, in order to prevent a decision in favour of the two cantons of Basel. However, majorities for this canton were only found in Brislach and Roggenburg. The second vote on March 16th was even more clearly in favor of Basel-Landschaft; the canton received 64.6% of the votes, while 35.4% preferred Solothurn. Once again, Brislach and Roggenburg were in the minority. While the people of Solothurn had shown great restraint before the first vote, they were now much more active, but this appeared intrusive to many. The Bernese cantonal government took note of the result and thanked the other cantons for their fair attitude during the process. The Basel-Landschaft authorities had also been cautious during the selection process, but were prepared to accept the Laufental. Their attitude can be summed up in the following words from National Councillor Felix Auer (FDP): "You Laufentalers must decide for yourselves where you want to go; if it's Basel-Landschaft, then you are very welcome here!"

== First referendums in Laufental and Basel-Landschaft ==
The district commission began negotiating the modalities of a possible change of canton. Eight specialist groups met with representatives of a negotiating delegation from Basel-Landschaft. In addition to two government councillors, it also included senior officials from the cantonal administration, accompanied by a 13-member commission from the cantonal council. After three readings, the district commission approved the negotiated Laufental Agreement on January 20, 1983, by 14 votes to 11. A short time later, on February 8, the Basel-Landschaft cantonal council gave its unanimous approval. The Basel-Landschaft cantonal parliament approved the agreement on May 2 by 57 votes to 7 (with five abstentions). The negotiating parties had already signed the agreement on February 10 in a festive ceremony at the Cantonal Museum in Liestal. Representing Basel-Landschaft were Landschreiber Franz Guggisberg and Regierungspräsident Theo Meier, while the Laufental district commission was represented by chief negotiator Rainer Weibel. The agreement's 112 paragraphs regulated numerous aspects such as integration into the Basel-Landschaft legal system, equal rights for Laufental residents compared to other cantonal citizens, the continuation of existing obligations, and the takeover of cantonal institutions and employees.

The political battle began as early as 1981, in the midst of negotiations on the agreement, and increasingly divided the Laufental community into two irreconcilable camps. The pro-Basel committee "Yes to the Best Solution" was opposed by the anti-separatist Aktion bernisches Laufental (ABL), founded in 1978. Although both groups emphasized their non-partisanship, the supporters of accession came mainly from CVP circles, while those loyal to Bern were close to the FDP; however, there were prominent "defectors" on both sides. The SP, which was still relatively insignificant in Laufental at the time, was divided but tended to lean towards the pro-Basel camp. Both committees sought professional advice from advertising agencies in Basel and Bern. They published regular referendum newspapers, organized public events, ran poster and advertising campaigns, and targeted specific groups with letter campaigns. Additional mouthpieces were the local newspapers Die Nordschweiz on the pro-Basel side and Volksfreund on the pro-Bern side.

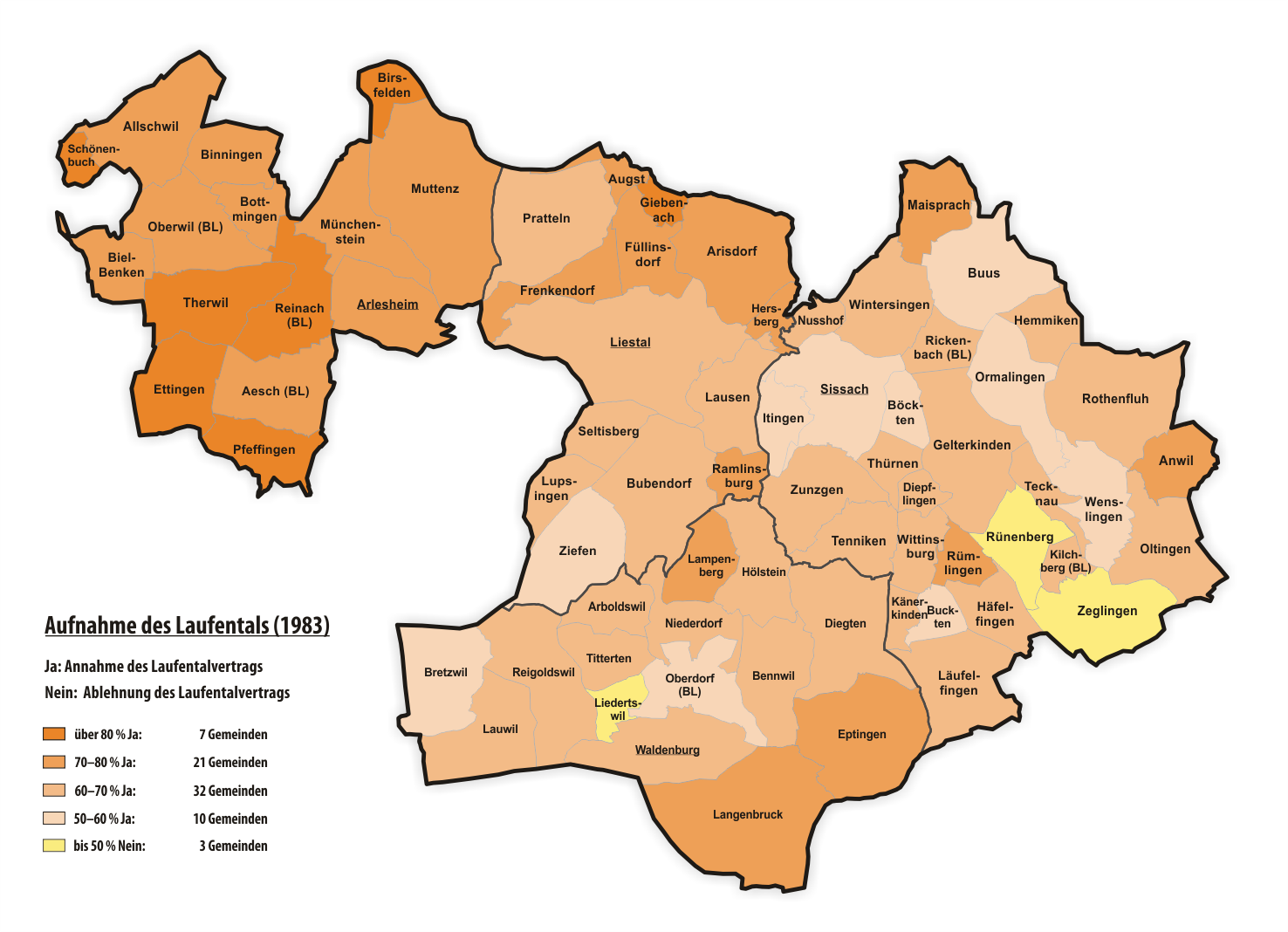
First vote on the Laufental Agreement in Baselland

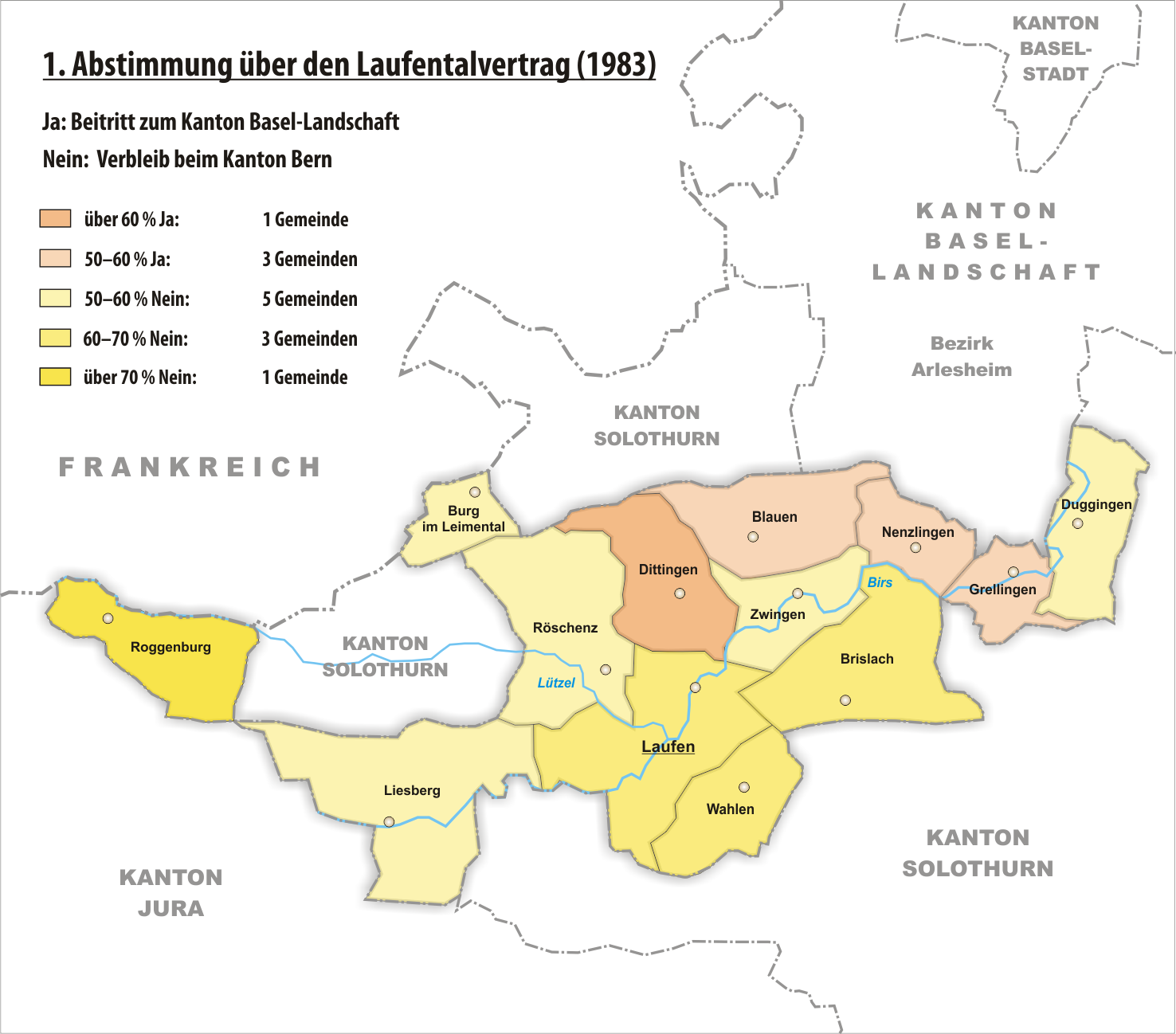
First vote on the Laufental Agreement in the district of Laufen

The moderate "Yes to the Best Solution" committee tried to convince with arguments, assuming that objectivity and fairness would pay off. It emphasized the geographical, economic, cultural, social and historical ties with the Basel region. However, the campaign seemed tame compared to that of the opposing side, which succeeded in shifting the voting issue to a purely emotional level. The ABL flooded the district with an unprecedented wave of propaganda that completely overshadowed the appearances of the pro-Basel side. One pamphlet in particular, which became known as the "red booklet", thoroughly disparaged the Laufental Agreement and did not shy away from making fabricated claims. Among other things, it spoke of the "violation of our district administration and our independence," that the Laufentalers would have to pay off the debts of the Basel region, and that the Laufental should not be "bartered away." Towards the end of the campaign, the committee "Laufentaler, worum denn furt?" (Laufentalers, where are you going?) also made an appearance, differentiating itself from the ABL in tone but not in aim. It appealed to those who were undecided and could not identify with the ABL's brutal methods.

On September 11, 1983, the decisive referendums were held in both the Laufen district and the canton of Basel-Landschaft. The people of Basel-Landschaft had to vote not only on the Laufental Agreement, but also on an amendment to the cantonal constitution and an admission law. The constitutional amendment increased the number of representatives in the cantonal parliament from 84 to 90 and created a new administrative and judicial district in Laufen. The admission law regulated the creation of official guardianship and justice of the peace districts, the takeover of the Laufen hospital, and the continuation of the pre-gymnasium department at the Laufental-Thierstein Gymnasium. With below-average turnout, around 73% of Basel-Landschaft residents voted in favor of acceptance; only three municipalities rejected the proposal. These results were ultimately completely meaningless, as the district of Laufen voted against the change of canton on the same day. The voting question "Do you want to join the canton of Basel-Landschaft on the basis of the agreed treaty?" was answered in the negative by 56.7% of voters, with a turnout of 93.0%. Yes majorities were only achieved in Blauen, Dittingen, Grellingen and Nenzlingen.

The Swiss media were surprised by the clear result. La Liberté commented that the people of Laufental, unlike the people of Jura, simply lacked the "patriotic drive". The Neue Zürcher Zeitung speculated that the "territorial inertia of the cantons was quite strong", while the Basler AZ spoke of a "cold shower" for the supporters of increased regional cooperation. The Berner Tagwacht was of the opinion that the clear decision would have a stabilizing effect on the Bernese Jura and Moutier in particular. Although the pro-Basel side accepted the result for the time being, they were of the opinion that those loyal to Bern had behaved unfairly. The district commission continued its work as the district council. In May 1984, the "Yes to the Best Solution" committee was replaced by the Laufental Movement (LB), chaired by Heinz Aebi, mayor of Nenzlingen. From the outset, it saw itself as a popular movement and thus differed from its predecessor, which had been supported more by a regional political elite. Its main goal was better integration into northwestern Switzerland. The LB showed solidarity with the Rassemblement jurassien and also included the Junge Kraft Laufental (JKL), which was clearly modelled on the Jura youth movement Béliers and attracted attention with provocative actions. The suspicion expressed by Le Jura libre after the vote that the opponents of accession had been financed by the canton of Bern was to prove true shortly afterwards.

== Unlawful secret payments uncovered ==
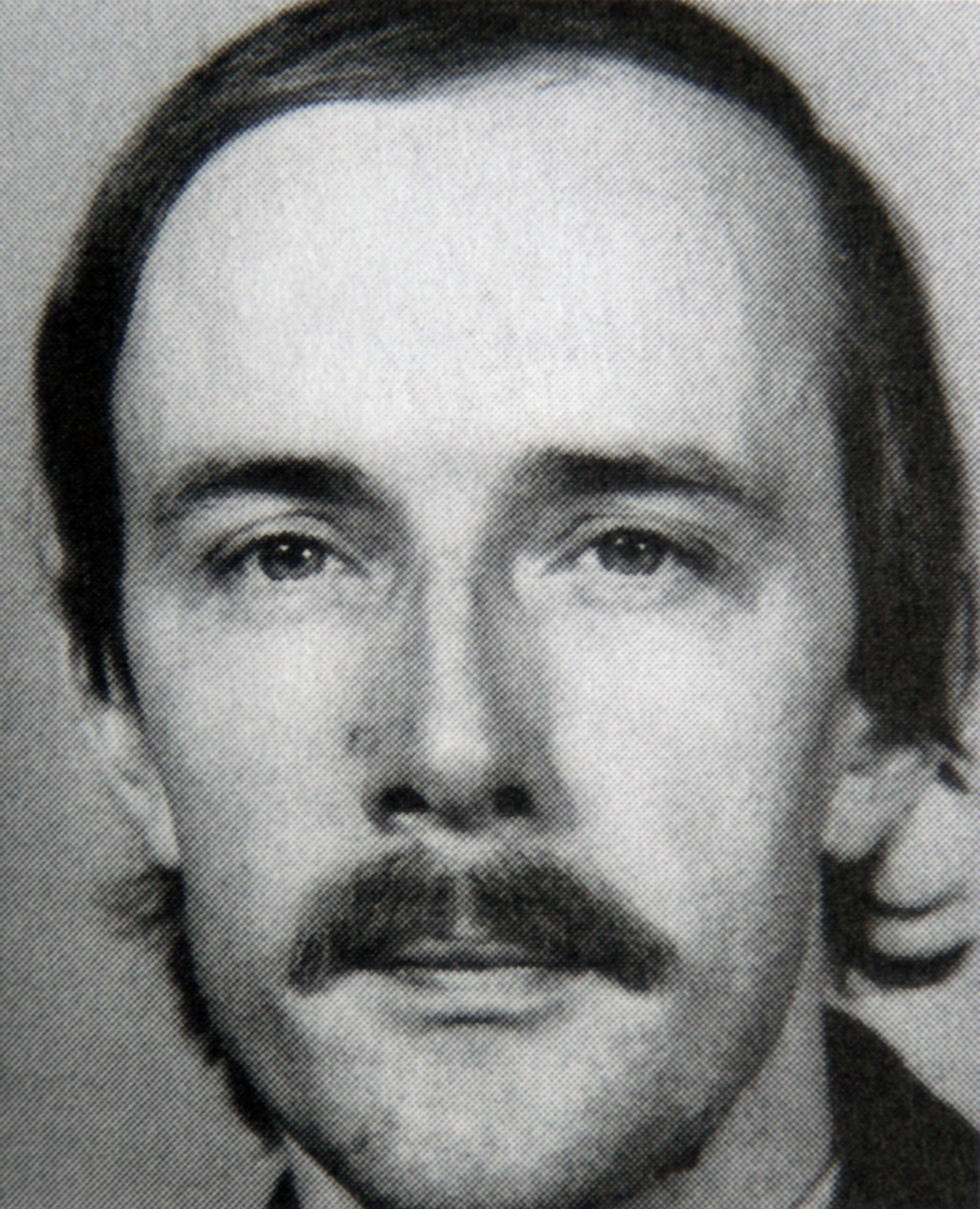
Rudolf Hafner in 1987

In August 1984, Rudolf Hafner, an auditor of the Bernese cantonal administration, acted as a whistleblower and made public the violation of various provisions of the Financial Budget Act as well as the misuse of tax money and funds from the SEVA lottery fund. Among other things, large sums of money are said to have been secretly transferred to organizations loyal to Bern in the Jura and Laufental via an account for "unforeseen expenses." Money is also alleged to have been used illegally to pay for social events organized by the cantonal administration, as well as pleasure trips and private expenses incurred by government councillors.

As a result of the revelations, the Grand Council set up a "Special Investigation Commission" (BUK). Its first report in August 1985 confirmed all the allegations, with the sums of money involved in some cases even higher than originally assumed. Between 1980 and 1983 alone, Force démocratique received CHF 120,000 to finance its activities, while Radio Jura bernois received CHF 125,000. A total of CHF 333,281 went to the ABL (equivalent to around CHF 37 for every eligible voter in the Laufental region), instead of the CHF 60,000 officially approved by the Grand Council as "one-off start-up aid." The Bern executive council admitted the allegations in October 1985 and explained that some of the secret payments had already begun in 1974. By 1982, a total of 730,000 francs had been paid to anti-separatist organizations in order to influence the Jura plebiscites and the Laufental referendums. The ABL's audit report published in March 1986 also showed that 85% of its budget had been financed by secret payments from Bern. This had enabled it to virtually dominate opinion-forming in the Laufental. The Bern financial affair occupied politicians and the judiciary for several years.

The first BUK report caused a storm of indignation in pro-Basel circles. The LB organized protest rallies, published a special newspaper and demanded a rerun of the vote. The JKL called for the immediate resignation of Werner Martignoni, the cantonal councilor primarily responsible, symbolically buried democracy in a coffin in front of the Berner Kantonalbank branch in Laufen, and published obituaries to that effect. Activists dressed as Bernese bears also distributed counterfeit money at a SEVA event to highlight the venality of the Bern loyalists. With the legal support of Jacques Gubler, the former president of the district commission, Heinz Aebi and four other LB members submitted a voting complaint to the Bernese Grand Council on September 3, 1985. Their reasoning was that the money paid out without a legal basis had massively influenced the vote; likewise, state bodies should not unilaterally support private committees with public funds. In addition, there was a motion by Councillor Jürg Schärer (POCH), who also called for a new vote in Laufental in view of the massive influence. At the same time, the district council formulated a formal petition with a detailed list of questions aimed at carrying out a more detailed investigation and returning the illegally paid out funds.

At the extraordinary district council meeting on October 25, 1985, Grand Councilor Rudolf Schmidlin (FDP), a leading member of the ABL, admitted that he had asked the canton for help at the time. He justified his actions by saying that the Bern loyalists had always been outvoted in the district council, which was financed with 1.3 million francs. The playing field had not been level, he said, and the canton of Bern had therefore "fallen behind in terms of information." On November 18, the Grand Council decided not to even consider the appeal by the five LB members, as the three-day appeal period had long since expired; it also rejected Schärer's motion. It accepted the district council's submission as a non-binding petition. The Basel-Landschaft authorities were also disappointed by the secret payments. They saw this as a violation of a "standstill agreement" in which both cantonal governments had committed themselves in 1982 not to "influence in any way" the Laufental's right to self-determination.

== Decisions of the Federal Supreme Court ==
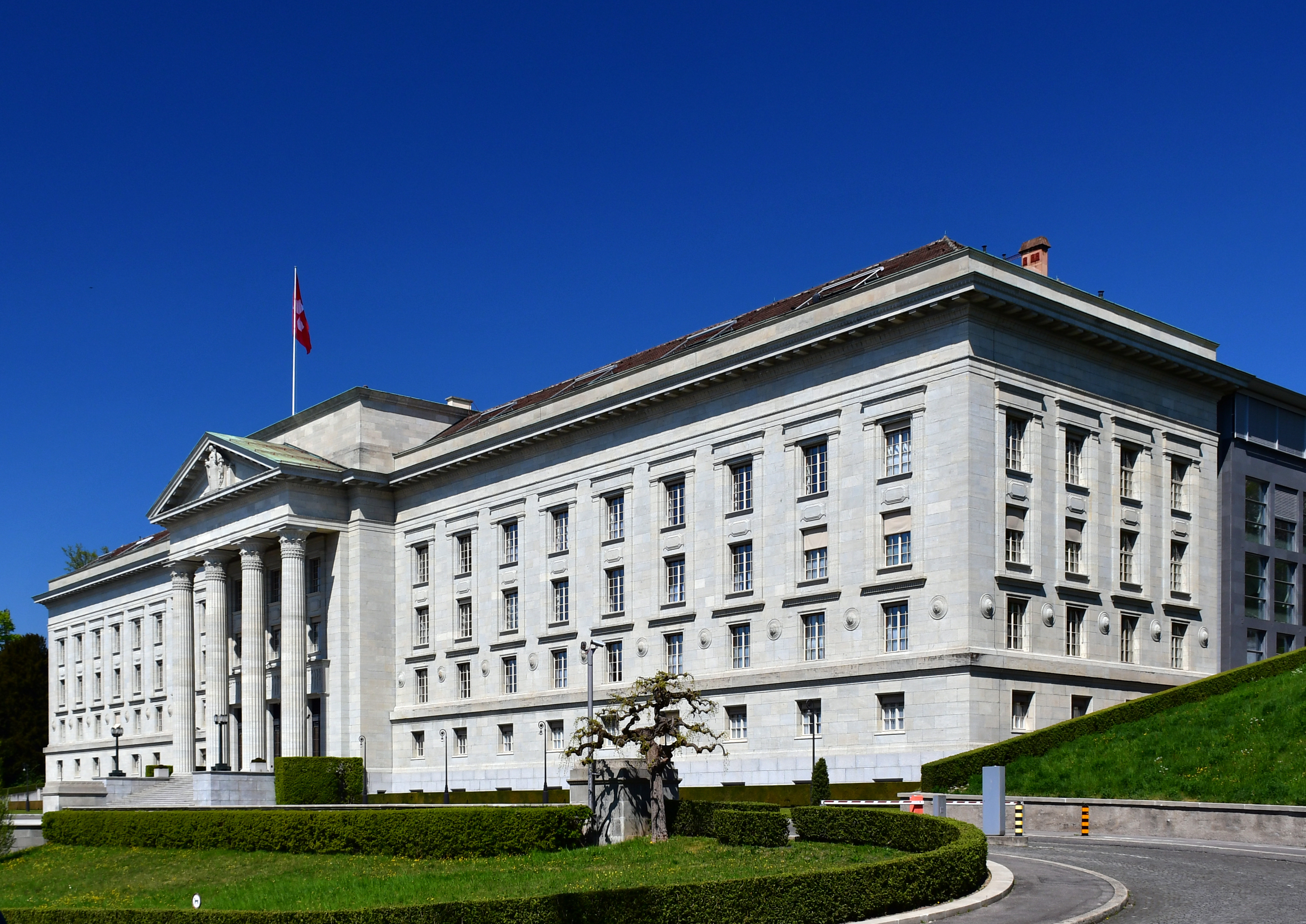
Seat of the Federal Supreme Court in Lausanne

The district commission then took further steps and submitted a new complaint to the Federal Council, asking it to set up an independent commission of inquiry and organize a new vote. On December 28, 1985, the Laufentaler Bewegung in turn lodged a constitutional complaint with the Federal Supreme Court, which concluded on March 18, 1987, that the Grand Council had been wrong not to consider the complaint. It was to be regarded as a request for reconsideration, as the circumstances had changed significantly since the vote. In accordance with the principle of Article 4 of the Federal Constitution, according to which all Swiss citizens are equal before the law, the persons concerned have a direct right to a review of the regularity of the relevant election or vote. It would be offensive to refuse the review simply because new facts or evidence had only been discovered after the deadline for appeals had expired.

The Grand Council dealt with the matter on November 3, 1987, but rejected the appeal at the request of the Government Council and the Justice Commission by 129 votes to 38. The financing of the referendum campaign had been necessary and legitimate. This had enabled the ABL to correct the image that had developed in the Swiss public since 1980, according to which the Laufental wanted to secede from Bern. In addition, the canton was obliged to compensate for this "information deficit" from a state policy perspective.

In the meantime, the Federal Council had forwarded the district council's complaint to the canton of Bern, which filed it away without responding. The plaintiffs of the LB challenged the decision of the Grand Council on December 18, 1987, with another constitutional complaint. They argued that the canton of Bern had unlawfully influenced public opinion and thus violated the right to self-determination of the Laufentalers, which is guaranteed by the cantonal constitution. The pro-Basel residents considered the election of Rudolf Schmidlin as president of the Grand Council on May 10, 1988, to be a provocation, which is why they boycotted the official ceremony in his home municipality of Laufen. In keeping with tradition, Schmidlin traveled there from Bern on a special train, which led to an incident. Two Bélier activists had torn down the overhead line of the Jura railway with stones in front of the north portal of the Grenchenberg Tunnel near Moutier, causing the train to be stuck for over an hour. Meanwhile, the LB organized a counter-event in Grellingen.

On December 20, 1988, the Federal Supreme Court announced its ruling: by six votes to one, it ordered the annulment and repetition of the 1983 vote, again holding that no result could be recognized that did not reliably and accurately reflect the free will of the voters. Although it acknowledged that the Canton of Bern had a particular interest in the matter and had an additional right to information, it criticized the nature, means and scope of the intervention. The payments to the ABL were made without any legal basis, and such support was reprehensible because it was provided secretly and without democratic control. Without the massive financial assistance, it would not have been possible for the ABL to conduct such an elaborate voting campaign, which is why it must be assumed that the voters had been influenced.

== Second referendum in Laufental ==
Immediately after the Federal Supreme Court ruling, the dispute returned to its former intensity. The ABL used the Volksfreund to attack the complainants and criticize the Federal Court, while the LB countered with its own newspaper dr Laufetaler. These players were joined by the "Jo zum Baselbiet" committee, which was founded on May 14, 1989. Although it also advocated a change of canton, it set itself apart by providing factual information and refraining from personal attacks; it appealed to those who were undecided and who could not come to terms with the harsh and aggressive style of the main opponents.

Two days earlier, representatives of the cantons and, on behalf of the district council, the chief negotiator Rudolf Imhof signed an amendment to the Laufental Agreement of 1983, which had become necessary due to new legal and political conditions. For example, Basel-Landschaft had adopted a new cantonal constitution in 1987. Otherwise, the Laufental Agreement could be adopted almost unchanged and only required a few editorial adjustments. It was also agreed that only the district of Laufen would be allowed to vote initially. Also, on May 12, the two cantonal governments and the executive committee of the district council concluded an "Agreement on the conduct of the authorities in the Laufental vote", in which the contracting parties committed themselves to providing objective information. In December 1988, the construction of the Grellingen bypass with the 2.8 km long Eggfluh tunnel was approved in a referendum in the canton of Bern. As a sign of goodwill, on September 24, 1989, the voters of Basel approved by a large majority a substantial cost-sharing agreement between the two cantonal governments.

The Bern loyalists were on the defensive, especially in the initial phase of the referendum campaign, as the revelations of the Bern financial affair and the rulings of the Federal Supreme Court had boosted the pro-Basel camp. The ABL attempted to justify the hidden acceptance of lottery fund money, thereby exposing itself to the accusation of ignoring the rules of the rule of law. However, it refrained from renaming its organization, as it feared that this could be interpreted as an "admission of guilt." Apart from shifts in emphasis, the arguments for and against the change of canton were the same as six years previously. The propaganda battle was fought even more doggedly, and the pro-Basel camp abandoned its restraint. For example, the LB copied the ABL's "red booklet" from 1983, including the graphic design, in order to accuse the Bern loyalists of "lies and deceit". The latter, in turn, showed a Gessler hat on a pole in the colors of the Basel region on their posters and referred to their opponents as "baliffs." The campaign of the "Jo zum Baselbiet" committee, on the other hand, focused on highlighting Laufentalers with positive messages.

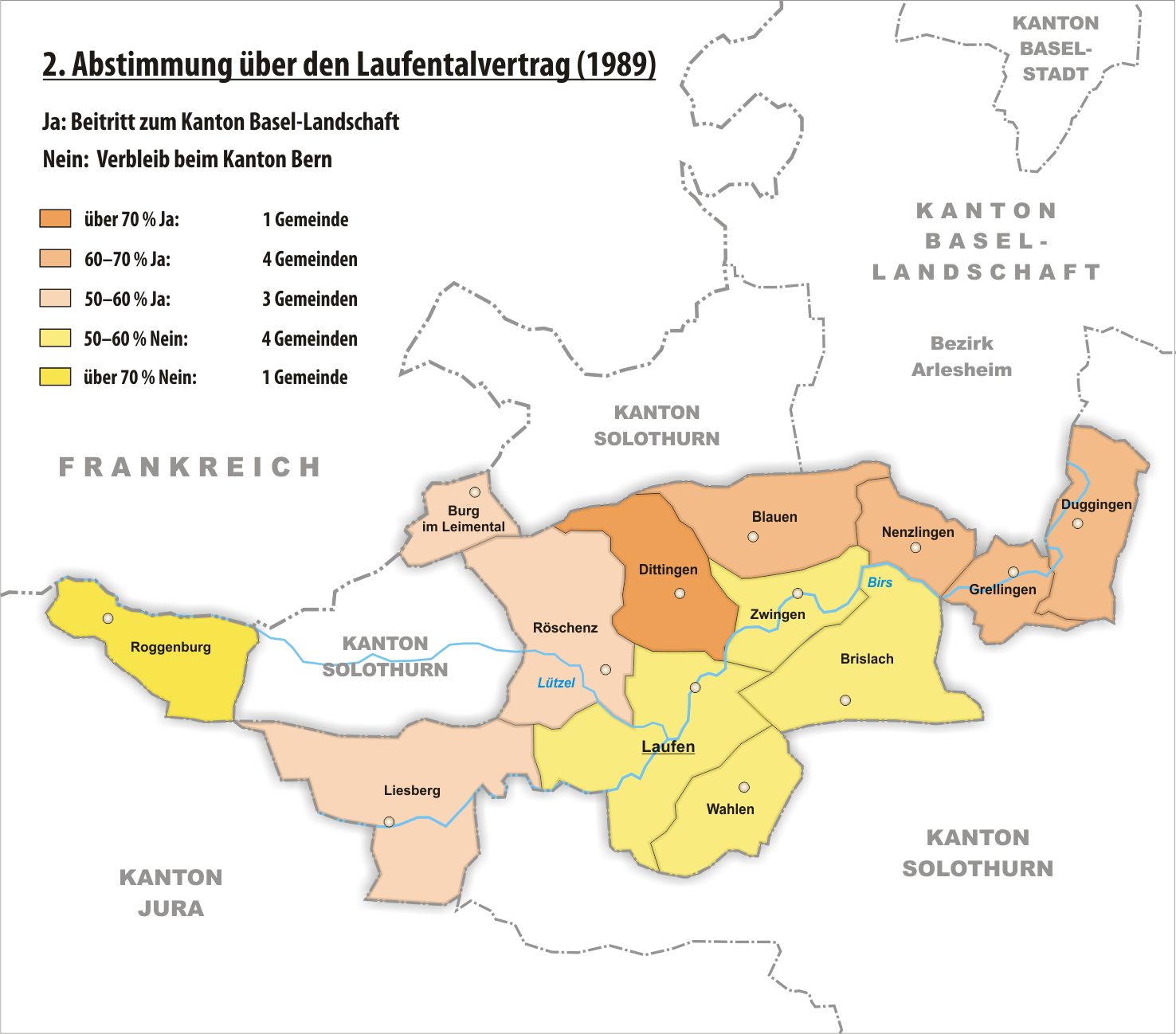
Second vote on the Laufental agreement in the district of Laufen

The second Laufental referendum on November 12, 1989, recorded a record-high voter turnout of 93.6%. Those in favor of joining Basel-Landschaft prevailed with 51.7% of the vote. In all municipalities except Roggenburg (which recorded a slight increase in the "no" vote), they were able to make significant gains in some cases. 8 out of 13 municipalities voted in favour of the question "Do you want to join the canton of Basel-Landschaft on the basis of the agreement of February 10, 1983 and its amendment of May 12, 1989?", with the municipalities of Burg im Leimental, Duggingen, Liesberg, and Röschenz switching to the Yes camp. The Bern loyalists attributed their defeat to the numerous newcomers from north-western Switzerland who had settled in Laufental over the past six years. On the other hand, the winners pointed to the high level of democratic legitimacy; the increase in votes was the result of a real turnaround.

The very next day, the ABL announced an appeal against the vote, which the LB immediately condemned as a delaying tactic. The two opposing blocs then regrouped: the anti-separatists joined forces in the Vereinigung berntreuer Laufentaler (VBL) and founded their own youth movement called "Wildschweine" (an allusion to the Bernese Jura's Sangliers), while the LB, "Jo zum Baselbiet", the JKL and the "Frauen und Mütter für Baselland" joined forces to form Laufental 91.

== Bernese legal and political maneuvers ==
In the days following the vote, four voting complaints were received from a total of ten Bern loyalists. The first claimed violations of voting rights and demanded a check of the electoral register and voting cards; the second called for the vote to be annulled as the supporters of accession may have received "financial contributions from neighboring cantons"; the third criticized the allegedly inadequate management of the electoral register. The fourth complaint alleged that the voters had been heavily influenced by attempts to exert pressure and false claims by the proponents of accession. The district administrator of Thun, who had been commissioned by the cantonal government to carry out the review, announced on December 1, 1989, that no serious shortcomings had been identified. Only two yes votes had to be declared invalid for formal reasons, otherwise everything had been correct. The cantonal council then moved to reject the complaints. Contrary to the recommendation of the judicial commission, however, the Grand Council surprisingly declared the result invalid on February 5, 1990, by a vote of 102 to 78, mainly with the support of the FDP and SVP parliamentary groups and individual SP representatives.

As announced immediately after the meeting of the Grand Council, representatives of Laufental 91 filed a further appeal to the Federal Supreme Court on March 16, 1990. Almost a year later, on March 13, 1991, it overturned the decision of the Grand Council by four votes to one. The judges found that the voters could be expected to "distinguish and select between different opinions expressed, that they can recognize obvious exaggerations as such and that they are ultimately in a position to make a rational decision based on their own convictions". Furthermore, none of the complaints were so serious that they could have really influenced the outcome. The judges instructed the lower court to comply with the cantonal government's request and declare the vote valid. The Federal Supreme Court did not even consider a second complaint by Bern loyalists, which claimed that the Grand Council had not taken all points of criticism into account. On June 25, 1991, the Grand Council complied by a vote of 95 to 20, with 70 members of parliament expressing their displeasure with the legally binding instruction by abstaining.

== Second referendum in Basel-Landschaft ==
The Bernese validation of the Laufental vote cleared the way for the referendums in the canton of Basel-Landschaft, where the amendments to the Laufental agreement and the cantonal constitution, as well as the admission law, had to be voted on. But here, too, there was resistance. A "Baselland without Laufental" committee led by cantonal councillor Rudolf Keller (SD) submitted two constitutional complaints in July 1991 with the support of Laufental residents loyal to Bern. In their opinion, the Laufental Agreement as a whole had to be put to the vote and not just the amendments. Although the committee did not think it had a chance, it pursued a delaying tactic with the declared intention of "spoiling" the Laufental for the people of Baselland.

On August 21, the Administrative Court unanimously rejected the complaints, whereupon the ruling was immediately appealed to the Federal Supreme Court; however, this had no suspensive effect. In their campaign, the opponents of the accession, supported by the VBL, tried to portray the Laufental as a major financial risk for the canton; they also constantly pointed to the narrow result of 1989. Militant groups carried out acts of vandalism, repeatedly staged noisy motorcades, and distributed anonymous leaflets. The proponents of accession tried as best they could to convince with arguments and recalled the high level of approval in 1983 ("Basel-Landschaft keeps its promise"). Landrat President Fritz Epple warned that "we must not capitulate to a small number of extremists, chaotic people and sprayers."

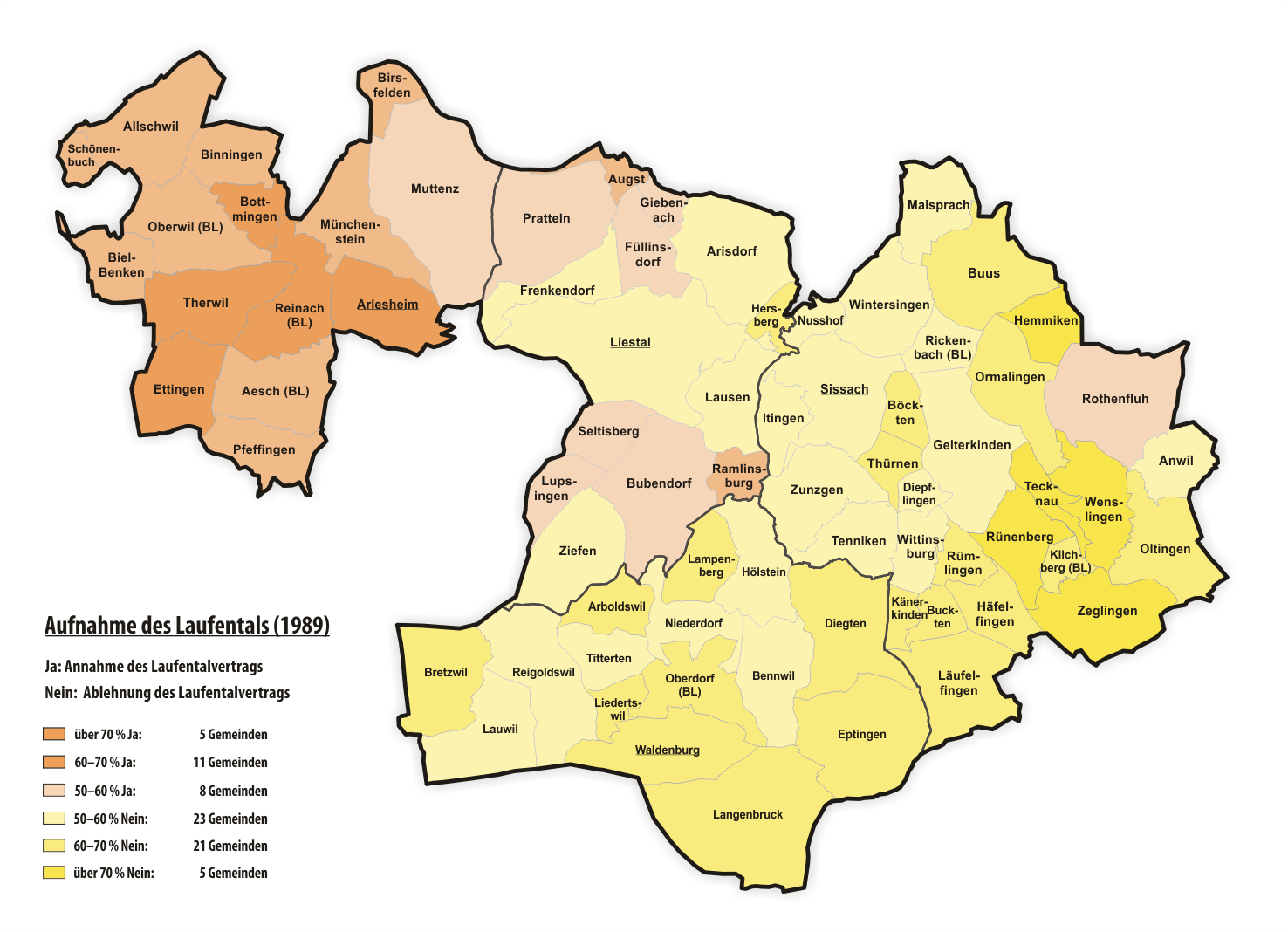
Second vote on the Laufental agreement in Baselland

On September 22, 1991, the people of Basel-Landschaft voted in favor of all three proposals by a margin of just over 59%, with a turnout of 40%. Compared to 1983, support had fallen sharply, particularly in the eastern part of the canton. The districts of Sissach and Waldenburg rejected the proposals by a clear margin, while the district of Liestal narrowly approved them. The deciding factor was the most populous district of Arlesheim, where more than two-thirds of voters wanted to include Laufental. The result became valid when the Federal Supreme Court dismissed the appeals as unfounded on November 11, 1992.

Sabotage attempts by three Laufental municipalities had no effect. In August 1992, popular initiatives were submitted in Brislach and Wahlen, calling for these municipalities to switch to the district of Thierstein in the canton of Solothurn, with reference to the 1970 constitutional amendment. Against the express will of the two municipal councils, the district administrator allowed the municipal votes to be held. The municipal councils then appealed to the cantonal government, which upheld their complaints. The initiators took the decision to the Federal Supreme Court, which declared the two municipal initiatives incompatible with cantonal law on December 28, 1992. On February 17, 1992, the voters of Roggenburg voted in favour of remaining with the canton of Bern, but neither canton listened to their concerns. Finally, the municipality held a "public consultation" on March 1, 1994; 55.3% of those who voted rejected further negotiations in this direction, which put an end to the issue once and for all.

== Transfer to Basel-Landschaft ==
On January 27, 1993, the Federal Council's dispatch "on the transfer of the Bernese district of Laufen to the canton of Basel-Landschaft and on the approval of the amended constitution of the canton of Basel-Landschaft" was submitted. In it, the Federal Council proposed combining the territorial change and the approval of the amendment to the cantonal constitution into a single item of business so as not to lose any more time. The aim was to implement the change at the beginning of the following year. The bill was completely uncontroversial among the members of the Council of States, but was more controversial in the National Council. Werner Scherrer (EDU Bern) moved that the council should not consider the bill, but his motion was clearly rejected. A motion by Hanspeter Seiler (SVP Bern), who wanted to make recognition of the change of canton conditional on the approval of the district concerned in addition to the people and the cantons, also stood no chance. Federal Councilor Arnold Koller and the majority of the council pointed out that neither the Bernese cantonal constitution nor the federal constitution provided for such a procedure. On June 18, the National Council approved the federal decree presented by the Federal Council unchanged by 112 votes to 27, and the Council of States by 30 votes to 2.

According to federal law at the time, cessions of territory between cantons not only required the approval of both chambers of the Federal Assembly, but were also subject to a mandatory referendum (since the total revision of the Swiss Federal Constitution in 1999, only an optional referendum is required). The referendum campaign did not cause much of a stir. With the exception of the SD, the EDU, and the Auto Party, all national parties recommended approving the proposal; at the cantonal level, the FDP Bern and the SVP Bern broke ranks. The result of the federal referendum on September 26, 1993, was unequivocal: with a turnout of 39.5%, 75.2% of voters and all cantons voted in favor of the Laufental's change of canton. In the canton of Bern, 57.3% voted in favor, and in the canton of Basel-Landschaft, 66.8%. The highest percentage of yes votes was recorded in the canton of Geneva (93.5%), the lowest in the canton of Solothurn (55.6%), where the very low approval rating in the district of Thierstein (27.7%) was particularly striking. In the district of Laufen itself, the yes vote rose to 52.8%; however, the municipalities of Brislach, Laufen, Liesberg, Roggenburg, Wahlen, and Zwingen voted against the change.

The imminent change of canton made it necessary to ensure the seamless continuity of administrative activities. To this end, initial negotiations between the authorities of both cantons had already begun in September 1991, both at government and administrative level. The district council played a central mediating role, as it was authorized to send representatives to all negotiations. This allowed the population to exert influence at all times. At the beginning of 1993, 85 administrative agreements were available for the district council to comment on by the end of June. As the legal status of the municipalities in the two cantons is not identical and the powers also differ, regular information events were held from September 1992 onwards to prepare the municipal authorities for the change of canton. A transitional period of ten years was agreed for the adaptation of the municipal regulations. On October 25, the signing of the agreements took place in Laufen as part of a festive ceremony. Werner Spitteler, Mario Annoni and Arnold Koller were present as representatives of the cantons of Basel-Landschaft and Bern, as well as the federal government. The FDP and VBL members of the district council boycotted the ceremony. In doing so, they protested against what they saw as the "sloppy and disinformation-based" information provided to voters, for which Koller and the FDJP were responsible.

The transfer of the Laufen district and its 13 municipalities to the canton of Basel-Landschaft took place on January 1, 1994, and was celebrated by around 800 pro-Basel residents on New Year's Eve at the Gymnasium Laufental-Thierstein. On New Year's Day, the Jura separatists welcomed their new neighboring canton at the border between Soyhières and Liesberg, and in Laufen, the president of the Basel-Landschaft cantonal government, Spitteler, invited the population to an aperitif attended by over 1000 people. The most visible changes, apart from place name and information signs, were in particular new vehicle registration plates, which had to be replaced within three months. The school systems of both cantons were run in parallel during a nine-year transition phase to avoid a change for those already in school; an agreement was also reached with the canton of Solothurn to continue operating the jointly run high school. On March 27, 1994, the people of Laufental elected their six representatives to the Basel-Landschaft cantonal council. The district council remained in place until 2003 to represent the interests of the people of Laufental vis-à-vis the government and administration. During this time, there was also an additional judicial commission whose task was to assess and settle legal issues arising from the change in the legal system during the transition period.

On the occasion of the 25th anniversary, numerous Swiss media revisited the topic and came to the conclusion that the change of canton had been largely successful and that the deep social rifts of that time were hardly noticeable anymore. However, there was some criticism in Laufental of the centralist tendencies of the canton of Basel-Landschaft and the withdrawal of administrative departments, which began soon after the ten-year transition period. One bone of contention was the Feninger Hospital in Laufen, whose services were gradually scaled back for financial reasons and due to its small catchment area. Its continued existence is "permanently guaranteed" in paragraph 45 of the Laufental Agreement. However, after the cantonal parliament unanimously decided in November 2020 to close the hospital and replace it with a health center offering outpatient care, the "Pro Spital Laufen" association filed a complaint with the Basel-Landschaft Cantonal Court. In January 2022, the court dismissed the complaint, ruling that the basic medical care guaranteed in the Laufental Agreement would continue to be provided even with a health center.

== Reception ==
In September 1989, Bernese dialect rock musician Dänu Siegrist and Junge Kraft Laufental released the song Loufetal, which was also included on the album I mine Ouge, released in 1991. It deals with the change of canton and criticizes in particular the events surrounding the Bern financial affair. The refrain reads:

«Loufe chasch nid choufe, nid mit em ganze Gäud vor Wäut. Loufe, das bisch du und das bin i, wie wärs mit Demokratie?»
(«You cannot buy Laufen, not with all the money in the world. Laufen, that's you and that's me, how about democracy?»)

== Bibliography ==
- Vom Bär zum Siebedupf. Vol. 83. Gesellschaft für Baselbieter Heimatforschung. June 2018.
- Vom Bär zum Siebedupf. Vol. 83. Gesellschaft für Baselbieter Heimatforschung. September 2018.
- Vom Bär zum Siebedupf. Vol. 83. Gesellschaft für Baselbieter Heimatforschung. December 2018.
- Lehrblätz Laufental. Vom schwierigen Weg der direkten Demokratie. Werd Verlag. 1993. ISBN 3-85932-105-6.
- Die jurassischen Separatisten. Eine Studie zur Soziologie des ethnischen Konflikts und der sozialen Bewegung. Verlag Anton Hain. 1972. ISBN 3-445-00942-2.
