= Kleinlützel =

- Municipality
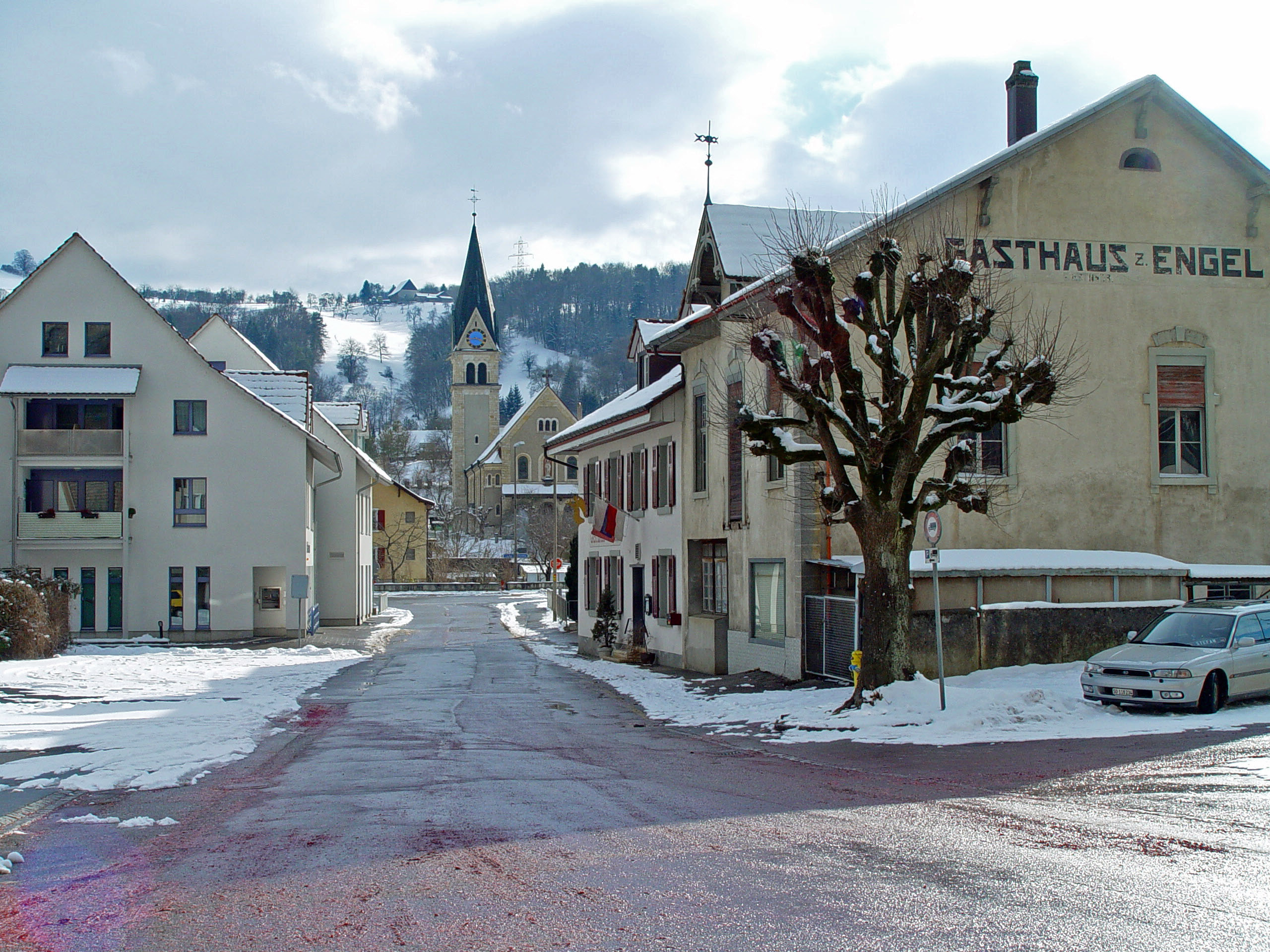
- Kleinlützel village

- Flag Coat of arms
- Location of Kleinlützel
- Location within Switzerland Location within Canton of Solothurn
- Coordinates: 47°25′29″N 7°25′08″E
- Country: Switzerland
- Canton: Solothurn
- District: Thierstein

Area
  - Total: 16.29 km^{2} (6.29 sq mi)
- Elevation: 420 m (1,380 ft)

Population (December 2020)
  - Total: 1,218
  - Density: 74.77/km^{2} (193.7/sq mi)
- Time zone: UTC+01:00 (CET)
  - Summer (DST): UTC+02:00 (CEST)
- Postal code: 4245
- SFOS number: 2619
- ISO 3166 code: CH-SO
- Localities: Huggerwald, Ring
- Surrounded by: Burg im Leimental (BL), Kiffis (FR-68), Liesberg (BL), Roggenburg (BL), Röschenz (BL), Wolschwiller (FR-68)
- Website: www.kleinluetzel.ch

Kleinlützel (French: Petit-Lucelle) is a municipality in the district of Thierstein in the canton of Solothurn in Switzerland. It is an exclave of the Canton of Solothurn, enclaved in the Canton of Basel-Country and Alsace.

== History ==
Kleinlützel is first mentioned in 1194 as Luozela. In 1207 it was mentioned as de Minori Luzela and in 1288 as Kleinen Lützel.

== Geography ==
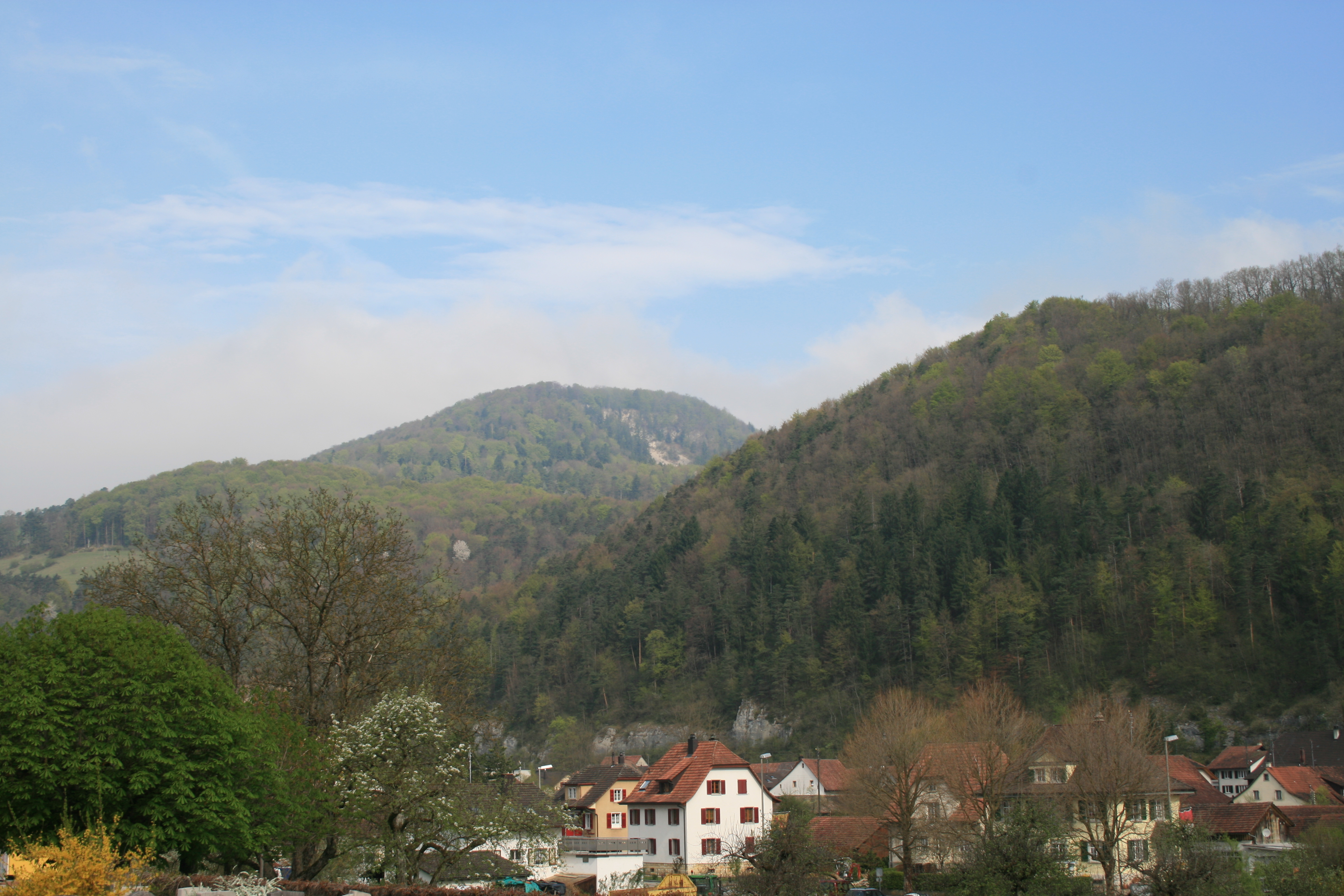
Kleinlützel

Aerial view from 300 m by Walter Mittelholzer (1922)

Kleinlützel has an area, as of 2009, of 16.29 square kilometers (6.29 sq mi). Of this area, 5.86 km^{2} (2.26 sq mi) or 36.0% is used for agricultural purposes, while 9.66 km^{2} (3.73 sq mi) or 59.3% is forested. Of the rest of the land, 0.74 km^{2} (0.29 sq mi) or 4.5% is settled (buildings or roads), 0.04 km^{2} (9.9 acres) or 0.2% is either rivers or lakes and 0.02 km^{2} (4.9 acres) or 0.1% is unproductive land.

Of the built up area, housing and buildings made up 3.0% and transportation infrastructure made up 1.4%. Out of the forested land, 56.7% of the total land area is heavily forested and 2.6% is covered with orchards or small clusters of trees. Of the agricultural land, 10.2% is used for growing crops and 24.7% is pastures. All the water in the municipality is flowing water.

The municipality is located in the Thierstein district. It is an exclave of the Canton of Solothurn along the Lützeltalstrasse (French: Laufen-Pruntrut). It consists of the village of Kleinlützel and the hamlets of Ober- and Nieder-Huggerwald and Ring as well as the former nun's convent of Klösterli.

== Coat of arms ==
The blazon of the municipal coat of arms is Or a Fess wavy Azure and in chief a Mullet of Five Gules.

== Demographics ==
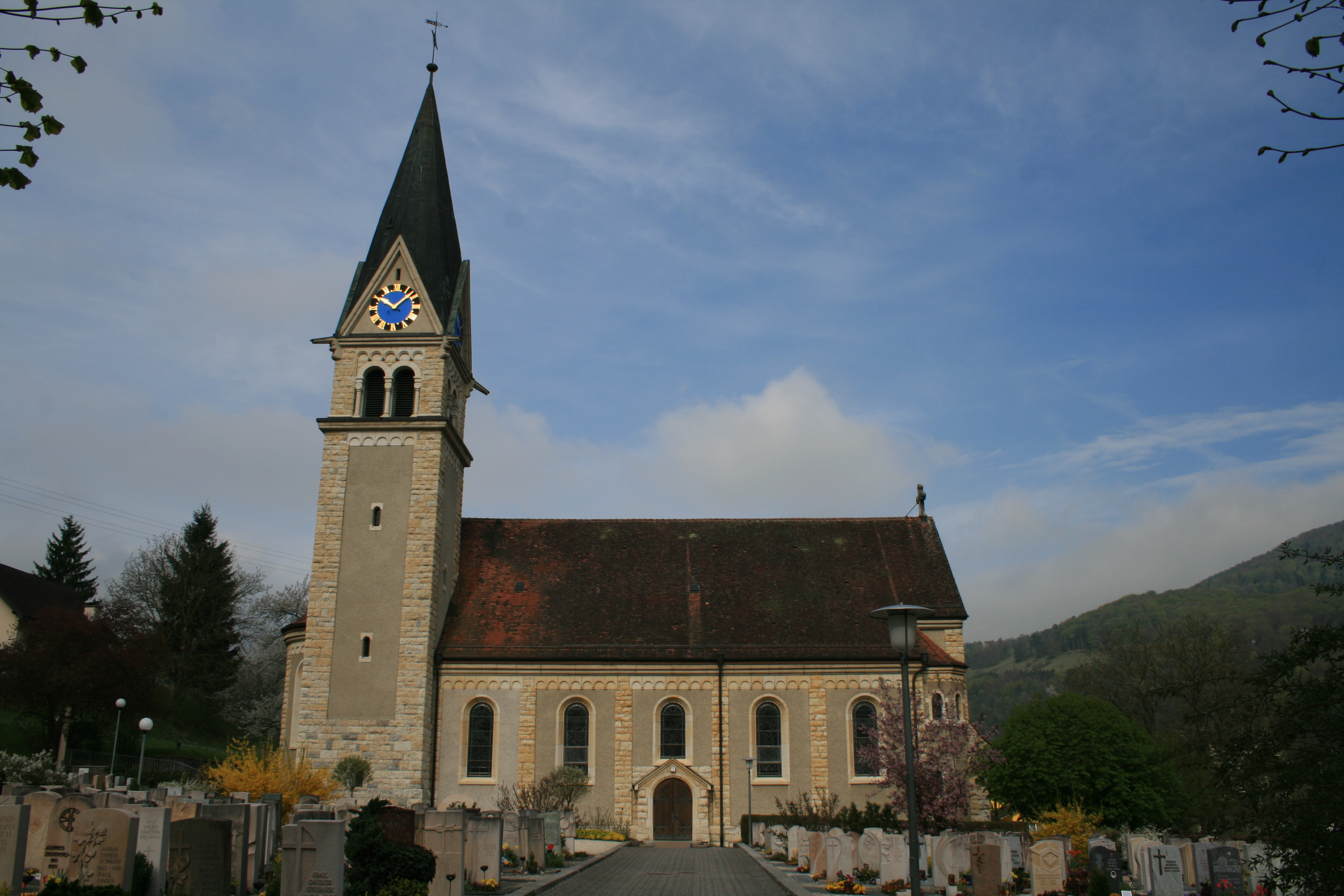
Church in Kleinlützel

Kleinlützel has a population (as of December 2020) of 1,218. As of 2008, 6.7% of the population are resident foreign nationals. Over the last 10 years (1999–2009 ) the population has changed at a rate of -0.2%. It has changed at a rate of 2.5% due to migration and at a rate of -1% due to births and deaths.

Most of the population (as of 2000) speaks German (1,154 or 92.8%), with Italian being second most common (22 or 1.8%) and French being third (12 or 1.0%). There are 2 people who speak Romansh.

As of 2008, the gender distribution of the population was 48.8% male and 51.2% female. The population was made up of 559 Swiss men (44.4% of the population) and 55 (4.4%) non-Swiss men. There were 599 Swiss women (47.6%) and 46 (3.7%) non-Swiss women. Of the population in the municipality 675 or about 54.3% were born in Kleinlützel and lived there in 2000. There were 107 or 8.6% who were born in the same canton, while 352 or 28.3% were born somewhere else in Switzerland, and 102 or 8.2% were born outside of Switzerland.

In 2008 there were 12 live births to Swiss citizens and 1 birth to non-Swiss citizens, and in same time span there were 14 deaths of Swiss citizens and 1 non-Swiss citizen death. Ignoring immigration and emigration, the population of Swiss citizens decreased by 2 while the foreign population remained the same. There were 4 Swiss men and 2 Swiss women who immigrated back to Switzerland. At the same time, there were 2 non-Swiss men and 3 non-Swiss women who immigrated from another country to Switzerland. The total Swiss population change in 2008 (from all sources, including moves across municipal borders) was a decrease of 3 and the non-Swiss population decreased by 2 people. This represents a population growth rate of -0.4%.

The age distribution, as of 2000, in Kleinlützel is; 105 children or 8.4% of the population are between 0 and 6 years old and 187 teenagers or 15.0% are between 7 and 19. Of the adult population, 55 people or 4.4% of the population are between 20 and 24 years old. 339 people or 27.3% are between 25 and 44, and 332 people or 26.7% are between 45 and 64. The senior population distribution is 178 people or 14.3% of the population are between 65 and 79 years old and there are 47 people or 3.8% who are over 80.

As of 2000, there were 465 people who were single and never married in the municipality. There were 658 married individuals, 76 widows or widowers and 44 individuals who are divorced.

As of 2000, there were 516 private households in the municipality, and an average of 2.4 persons per household. There were 139 households that consist of only one person and 37 households with five or more people. Out of a total of 520 households that answered this question, 26.7% were households made up of just one person and there were 4 adults who lived with their parents. Of the rest of the households, there are 175 married couples without children, 170 married couples with children There were 19 single parents with a child or children. There were 9 households that were made up of unrelated people and 4 households that were made up of some sort of institution or another collective housing.

In 2000 there were 300 single family homes (or 69.0% of the total) out of a total of 435 inhabited buildings. There were 58 multi-family buildings (13.3%), along with 62 multi-purpose buildings that were mostly used for housing (14.3%) and 15 other use buildings (commercial or industrial) that also had some housing (3.4%). Of the single family homes 56 were built before 1919, while 47 were built between 1990 and 2000.

In 2000 there were 567 apartments in the municipality. The most common apartment size was 5 rooms of which there were 145. There were 10 single room apartments and 234 apartments with five or more rooms. Of these apartments, a total of 504 apartments (88.9% of the total) were permanently occupied, while 30 apartments (5.3%) were seasonally occupied and 33 apartments (5.8%) were empty. As of 2009, the construction rate of new housing units was 2.4 new units per 1000 residents. The vacancy rate for the municipality, in 2010, was 1.33%.

The historical population is given in the following chart:

== Politics ==
In the 2007 federal election the most popular party was the SVP which received 25.35% of the vote. The next three most popular parties were the FDP (22.85%), the CVP (22.68%) and the SP (16.5%). In the federal election, a total of 450 votes were cast, and the voter turnout was 46.5%.

== Economy ==
As of 2010, Kleinlützel had an unemployment rate of 2.8%. As of 2008, there were 56 people employed in the primary economic sector and about 25 businesses involved in this sector. 229 people were employed in the secondary sector and there were 19 businesses in this sector. 66 people were employed in the tertiary sector, with 24 businesses in this sector. There were 599 residents of the municipality who were employed in some capacity, of which females made up 37.2% of the workforce.

In 2008 the total number of full-time equivalent jobs was 307. The number of jobs in the primary sector was 38, all of which were in agriculture. The number of jobs in the secondary sector was 215 of which 175 or (81.4%) were in manufacturing and 40 (18.6%) were in construction. The number of jobs in the tertiary sector was 54. In the tertiary sector; 11 or 20.4% were in wholesale or retail sales or the repair of motor vehicles, 10 or 18.5% were in the movement and storage of goods, 7 or 13.0% were in a hotel or restaurant, 4 or 7.4% were in the information industry, 1 was the insurance or financial industry, 5 or 9.3% were technical professionals or scientists, 11 or 20.4% were in education and 1 was in health care.

In 2000, there were 193 workers who commuted into the municipality and 377 workers who commuted away. The municipality is a net exporter of workers, with about 2.0 workers leaving the municipality for every one entering. About 14.5% of the workforce coming into Kleinlützel are coming from outside Switzerland. Of the working population, 23.9% used public transportation to get to work, and 46.9% used a private car.

== Religion ==
From the 2000 census, 913 or 73.5% were Roman Catholic, while 158 or 12.7% belonged to the Swiss Reformed Church. Of the rest of the population, there was 1 individual who belongs to the Christian Catholic Church, and there were 9 individuals (or about 0.72% of the population) who belonged to another Christian church. There were 24 (or about 1.93% of the population) who were Islamic. There were 2 individuals who were Buddhist and 2 individuals who were Hindu. 129 (or about 10.38% of the population) belonged to no church, are agnostic or atheist, and 5 individuals (or about 0.40% of the population) did not answer the question.

== Education ==
In Kleinlützel about 503 or (40.5%) of the population have completed non-mandatory upper secondary education, and 77 or (6.2%) have completed additional higher education (either university or a Fachhochschule). Of the 77 who completed tertiary schooling, 71.4% were Swiss men, 20.8% were Swiss women.

During the 2010–2011 school year there were a total of 137 students in the Kleinlützel school system. The education system in the Canton of Solothurn allows young children to attend two years of non-obligatory Kindergarten. During that school year, there were 24 children in kindergarten. The canton's school system requires students to attend six years of primary school, with some of the children attending smaller, specialized classes. In the municipality there were 113 students in primary school. The secondary school program consists of three lower, obligatory years of schooling, followed by three to five years of optional, advanced schools. All the lower secondary students from Kleinlützel attend their school in a neighboring municipality.

As of 2000, there were 2 students in Kleinlützel who came from another municipality, while 74 residents attended schools outside the municipality.
