= Ederswiler =

- Municipality
- Coat of arms
- Location of Ederswiler
- Location within Switzerland Location within Canton of Jura
- Coordinates: 47°25′N 07°20′E
- Country: Switzerland
- Canton: Jura
- District: Delémont

Government
  - Executive: Gemeinderat
  - Mayor: Maire (as of 2026)

Area
  - Total: 3.32 km^{2} (1.28 sq mi)
- Elevation: 553 m (1,814 ft)

Population (December 2005)
  - Total: 118
  - Density: 35.5/km^{2} (92.1/sq mi)
- Time zone: UTC+01:00 (CET)
  - Summer (DST): UTC+02:00 (CEST)
- Postal code: 2813
- SFOS number: 6713
- ISO 3166 code: CH-JU
- Surrounded by: Pleigne, Movelier, Roggenburg (BL)
- Website: ederswiler.ch

Ederswiler (Frainc-Comtou: Edrechweur) is a municipality in the district of Delémont in the canton of Jura in Switzerland. It is the only German-speaking municipality in the canton, where all others are French-speaking.

== History ==
Ederswiler is first mentioned in 1323 as Ernswilre. The village was part of the parish of Roggenburg, which fell under the control of the Bishop of Basel. Between 1389 and 1454, the parish was handed over as a fiefdom to the Count of Thierstein. Between 1793 and 1815, Ederswiler was part of France and was initially in the département of Mont-Terrible, but was merged with the département of Haut-Rhin in 1800. In 1815, the Congress of Vienna established that the municipality would become part of the canton of Bern.

In the 1974 Plebiscite of Jura, Ederswiler objected to the creation of the French-speaking canton of Jura. However, the community had no border with the district of Laufen, so unlike all other border communities, it was not able to decide for itself which canton it would belong to. On 1 January 1979, Ederswiler was handed over from Bern to the new canton of Jura. For a long time, it was debated that Ederswiler should be returned to the canton of Bern, while the municipality of Vellerat, which had refused to join Jura for similar reasons, would finally become part of that canton. In 1990, when the population of Laufen voted to transfer to the canton of Basel-Country, Ederswiler was left with no common border with the canton of Bern. Since then, there has been no new discussion regarding Ederswiler switching cantons.

== Geography ==
Ederswiler has an area of 3.31 km^{2} (1.28 sq mi). Of this area, 1.83 km^{2} (0.71 mi^{2}) or 55.3% is used for agricultural purposes, while 1.37 km^{2} (0.53 mi^{2}) or 41.4% is forested. Of the rest of the land, 0.14 km^{2} (35 acres) or 4.2% is settled (buildings or roads).

Of the built up area, housing and buildings made up 2.1% and transportation infrastructure made up 0.6%. Out of the forested land, 33.2% of the total land area is heavily forested and 8.2% is covered with orchards or small clusters of trees. Of the agricultural land, 10.3% is used for growing crops and 21.8% is pastures and 22.4% is used for alpine pastures.

Ederswiler is a farming village. It lies at an altitude of 553 m (1,814 ft), 7 km (4.3 mi) north of Delémont, the capital city of the canton of Jura. The village is situated in the northern Jura Mountains, close to the border with France, in a hollow of a stream called the Bösen.

It encompasses the valley of the Bösen, which drains northwards into the river Lützel (French: Lucelle). To the south and south-east, the municipality's boundary extends to a small mountain range containing Berg (858 m [2,815 ft]) and Hasenschell (870 m [2,850 ft]). The northern boundary consists of a rocky projection called Lobberg (771 m [2,530 ft]), and in the north the limestone cliffs of the Hallen tower over the village.

There are numerous individual farmsteads across the municipality of Ederswiler. Its neighbouring communities are Pleigne and Movelier in the canton of Jura and Roggenburg in the canton of Basel-Country.

== Coat of arms ==
The blazon of the municipal coat of arms is Gules, two Pallets Or, overall on a Fess Argent three birds of the first.

== Demographics ==
Ederswiler has a population (as of December 2020) of 118. As of 2008, 4.8% of the population are resident foreign nationals. Over the last 10 years (2000–2010) the population has changed at a rate of -4.7%. Migration accounted for -3.9%, while births and deaths accounted for -2.3%.

Most of the population (as of 2000) speaks German (109 or 84.5%) as their first language, French is the second most common (13 or 10.1%) and Spanish is the third (3 or 2.3%). There are 2 people who speak Italian.

As of 2008, the population was 50.8% male and 49.2% female. The population was made up of 59 Swiss men (48.4% of the population) and 3 (2.5%) non-Swiss men. There were 57 Swiss women (46.7%) and 3 (2.5%) non-Swiss women. Of the population in the municipality, 75 or about 58.1% were born in Ederswiler and lived there in 2000. There were 3 or 2.3% who were born in the same canton, while 27 or 20.9% were born somewhere else in Switzerland, and 23 or 17.8% were born outside of Switzerland.

As of 2000, children and teenagers (0–19 years old) make up 17.1% of the population, while adults (20–64 years old) make up 65.1% and seniors (over 64 years old) make up 17.8%.

As of 2000, there were 49 people who were single and never married in the municipality. There were 61 married individuals, 14 widows or widowers and 5 individuals who are divorced.

As of 2000, there were 51 private households in the municipality, and an average of 2.5 persons per household. There were 16 households that consist of only one person and 7 households with five or more people. In 2000, a total of 48 apartments (78.7% of the total) were permanently occupied, while 11 apartments (18.0%) were seasonally occupied and 2 apartments (3.3%) were empty.

The historical population is given in the following chart:

== Politics ==
In the 2007 federal election the most popular party was the SVP which received 91.3% of the vote. The other two parties that got votes were the CVP (4.3%) and the CSP (4.3%). In the federal election, a total of 23 votes were cast, and the voter turnout was 24.0%.

== Economy ==
Ederswiler's economy relies upon, and is dominated by, agriculture. More than 50% of the local workforce is employed in agriculture. The remaining working people in the municipality commute to other areas. An international motocross race takes place in the community every year.

As of 2010, Ederswiler had an unemployment rate of 1.4%. As of 2008, there were 19 people employed in the primary economic sector and about 8 businesses involved in this sector. 18 people were employed in the secondary sector and there were 3 businesses in this sector. 2 people were employed in the tertiary sector, with 1 business in this sector. There were 65 residents of the municipality who were employed in some capacity, of which females made up 33.8% of the workforce.

In 2008 the total number of full-time equivalent jobs was 30. The number of jobs in the primary sector was 13, all of which were in agriculture. The number of jobs in the secondary sector was 16 of which 8 or (50.0%) were in manufacturing and 8 (50.0%) were in construction. The number of jobs in the tertiary sector was 1, in the sale or repair of motor vehicles.

In 2000, there were 13 workers who commuted into the municipality and 35 workers who commuted away. The municipality is a net exporter of workers, with about 2.7 workers leaving the municipality for every one entering. Of the working population, 10.8% used public transportation to get to work, and 49.2% used a private car.

== Religion ==
From the 2000 census, 98 or 76.0% were Roman Catholic, while 14 or 10.9% belonged to the Swiss Reformed Church. Of the rest of the population, there were 16 individuals (or about 12.40% of the population) who belonged to another Christian church. Seven residents (or about 5.43% of the population) belonged to no church, were agnostic or atheist, and two individuals (or about 1.55% of the population) did not answer the question.

== Education ==
In Ederswiler about 30 or (23.3%) of the population have completed non-mandatory upper secondary education, and 3 or (2.3%) have completed additional higher education (either university or a Fachhochschule). Of the 3 who completed tertiary schooling, 100.0% were Swiss men, 0.0% were Swiss women.

The Canton of Jura school system provides two year of non-obligatory Kindergarten, followed by six years of Primary school. This is followed by three years of obligatory lower Secondary school where the students are separated according to ability and aptitude. Following the lower Secondary students may attend a three or four year optional upper Secondary school followed by some form of Tertiary school or they may enter an apprenticeship.

During the 2009–10 school year, there were no students attending school in Ederswiler. As of 2000, there were 14 students from Ederswiler who attended schools outside the municipality.

== Transport ==
Ederswiler lies some distance away from any major roads. The road running through the village connects Delémont (German: Delsberg) with Ferrette (German: Pfirt) in Alsace, in France. The village is linked by Postauto on the Delémont-Roggenburg and Laufen-Roggenburg routes. The village is also the only one in Jura to be integrated into the Tarifverbund Nordwestschweiz (North-Western Switzerland Transport Network).

== Places of interest ==
There is a chapel in the village called the Sankt-Anna-Kapelle, which was constructed in 1857.
