= Kiffis =

Commune in Grand Est, France

- Commune
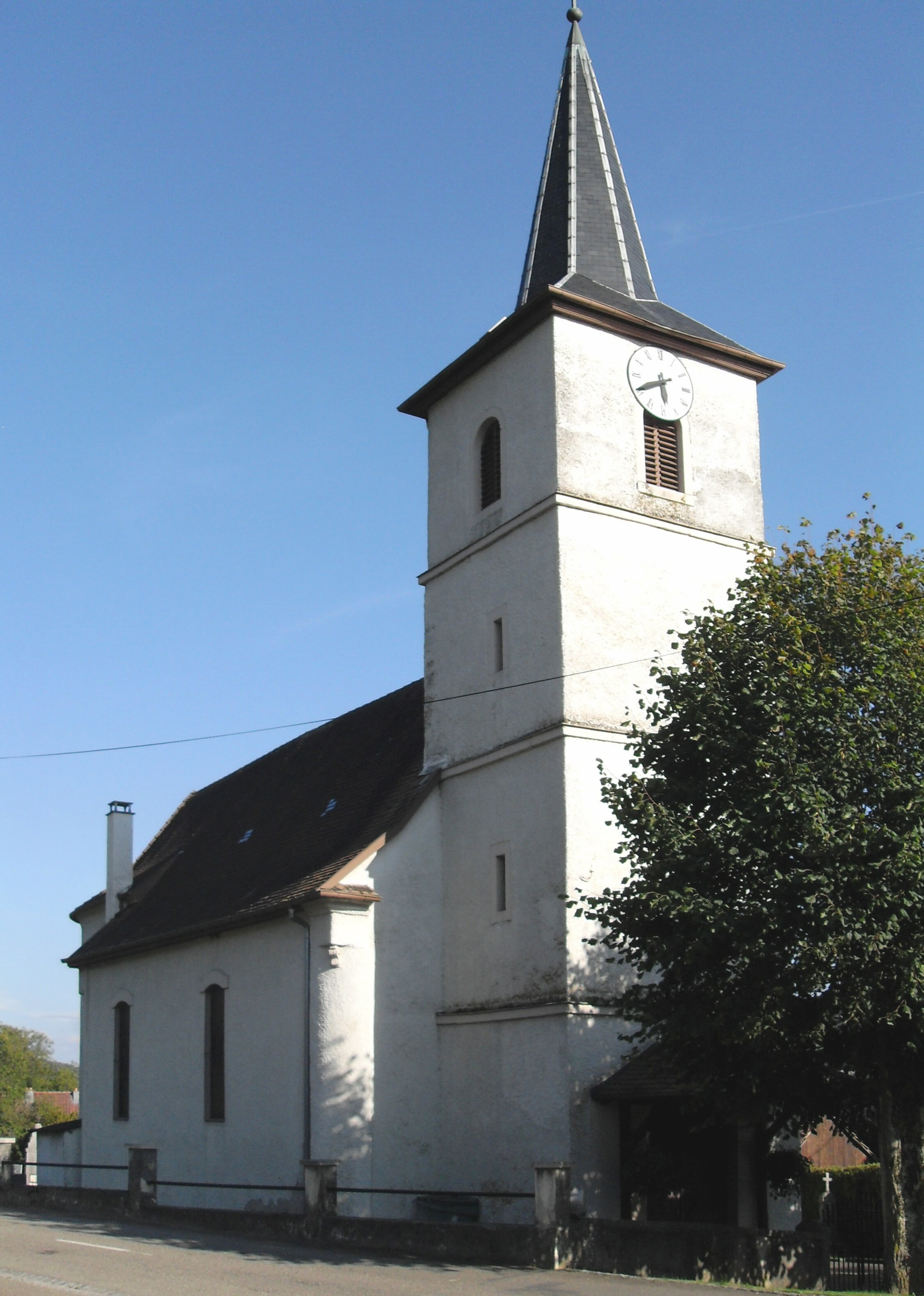
- Church of Kiffis

- Coat of arms
- Location of Kiffis
- Location within France Location within Grand Est
- Coordinates: 47°26′28″N 7°21′28″E
- Country: France
- Region: Grand Est
- Department: Haut-Rhin
- Arrondissement: Altkirch
- Canton: Altkirch

Government
  - Mayor (2020–2026): Michel Lerch
- Area^{1}: 6.55 km^{2} (2.53 sq mi)
- Elevation: 565 m (1,854 ft)
- Highest elevation: 785 m (2,575 ft)
- Lowest elevation: 456 m (1,496 ft)
- Population (2023): 238
  - Density: 36.3/km^{2} (94.1/sq mi)
- Time zone: UTC+01:00 (CET)
  - Summer (DST): UTC+02:00 (CEST)
- INSEE/Postal code: 68165 /68480
- ^{1} French Land Register data, which excludes lakes, ponds, glaciers > 1 km^{2} (0.386 sq mi or 247 acres) and river estuaries.

Kiffis (French pronunciation: [kifis]) is a commune in the Haut-Rhin department in Alsace in north-eastern France.

== See also ==
- Communes of the Haut-Rhin département
