= Burg Castle =

Burg Castle (German: Schloss Burg) may refer to:

- Burg Castle (Solingen), in the German state of North Rhine-Westphalia
- Burg Castle (Burg im Leimental), in the Swiss canton of Basel-Landschaft

See also

- Berg Castle, in Luxembourg
- Berg Castle (Bavaria)
