= Nenzlingen =

- Municipality
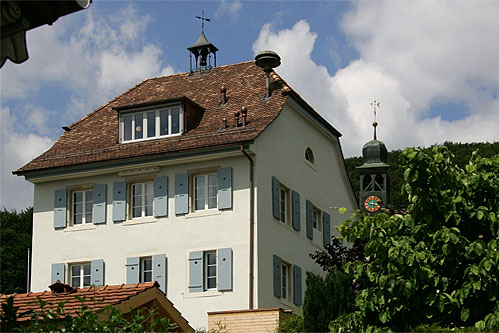

- Coat of arms
- Location of Nenzlingen
- Location within Switzerland Location within Canton of Basel-Landschaft
- Coordinates: 47°27′N 7°34′E
- Country: Switzerland
- Canton: Basel-Landschaft
- District: Laufen

Area
  - Total: 3.66 km^{2} (1.41 sq mi)
- Elevation: 438 m (1,437 ft)

Population (June 2021)
  - Total: 457
  - Density: 125/km^{2} (323/sq mi)
- Time zone: UTC+01:00 (CET)
  - Summer (DST): UTC+02:00 (CEST)
- Postal code: 4224
- SFOS number: 2789
- ISO 3166 code: CH-BL
- Surrounded by: Blauen, Brislach, Ettingen, Grellingen, Pfeffingen, Zwingen
- Website: https://www.baselland.ch/politik-und-behorden/gemeinden/nenzlingen SFSO statistics

Nenzlingen is a municipality in the district of Laufen in the canton of Basel-Country in Switzerland.

== History ==
Nenzlingen is first mentioned in 1294 as Nencilingen.

== Geography ==
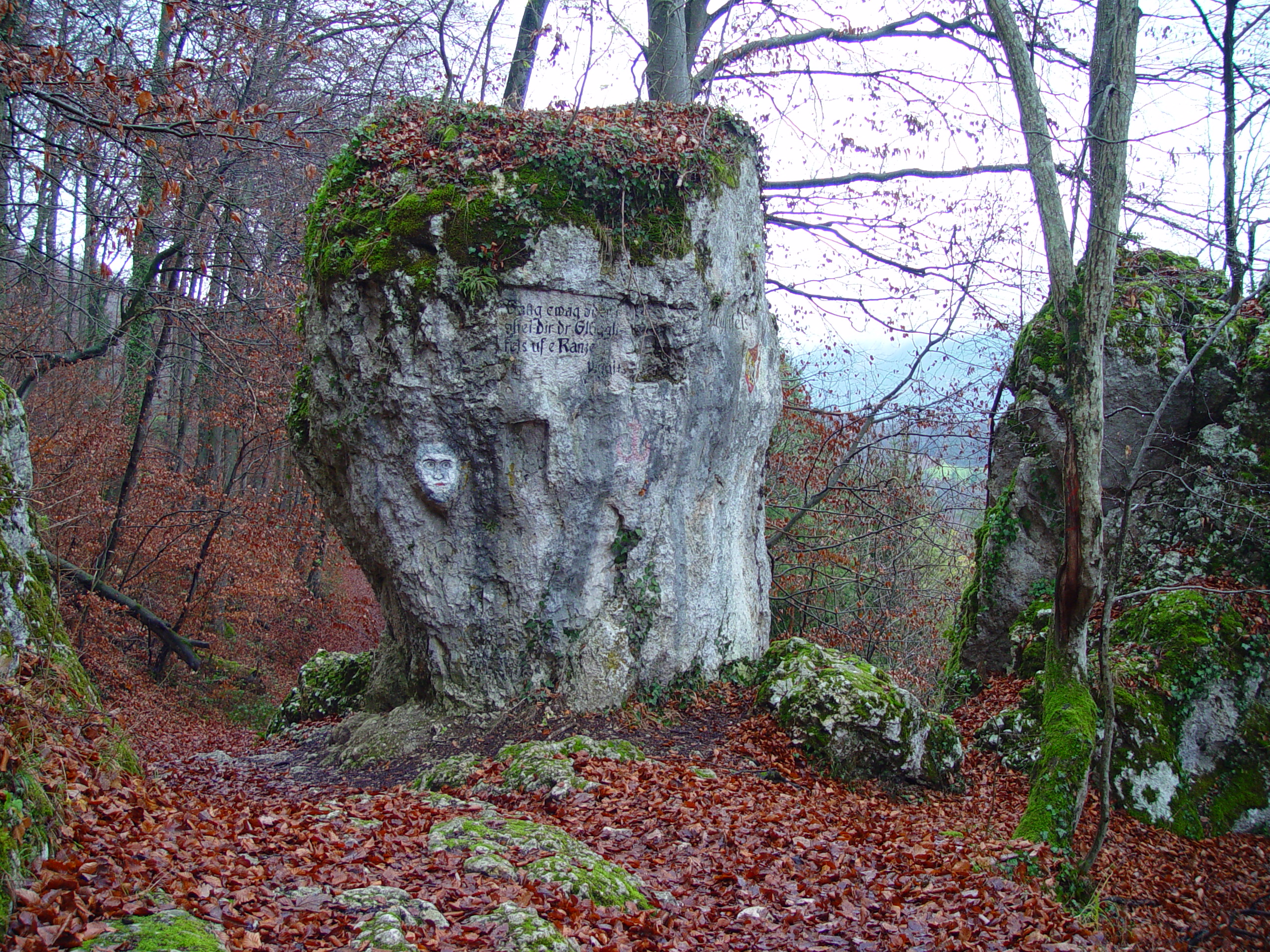
An imposing rock, about 5 m (16 ft) high with brightly painted image of a face, which welcomes hikers to the footpath from the ruin of Pfeffingen Castle to Nenzlingen

Aerial view (1950)

Nenzlingen has an area, as of 2009, of 3.66 square kilometers (1.41 sq mi). Of this area, 1.53 km^{2} (0.59 sq mi) or 41.8% is used for agricultural purposes, while 1.8 km^{2} (0.69 sq mi) or 49.2% is forested. Of the rest of the land, 0.26 km^{2} (0.10 sq mi) or 7.1% is settled (buildings or roads), 0.03 km^{2} (7.4 acres) or 0.8% is either rivers or lakes and 0.03 km^{2} (7.4 acres) or 0.8% is unproductive land.

Of the built up area, housing and buildings made up 3.6% and transportation infrastructure made up 3.6%. Out of the forested land, 47.8% of the total land area is heavily forested and 1.4% is covered with orchards or small clusters of trees. Of the agricultural land, 13.9% is used for growing crops and 15.6% is pastures, while 1.9% is used for orchards or vine crops and 10.4% is used for alpine pastures. All the water in the municipality is flowing water.

The municipality is located in the Laufen district, in the Blauen hills. It consists of the haufendorf village (an irregular, unplanned and quite closely packed village, built around a central square) of Nenzlingen.

== Coat of arms ==
The blazon of the municipal coat of arms is Per pale, Gules a Key Argent, Argent a Bar fleury Azure.

== Demographics ==
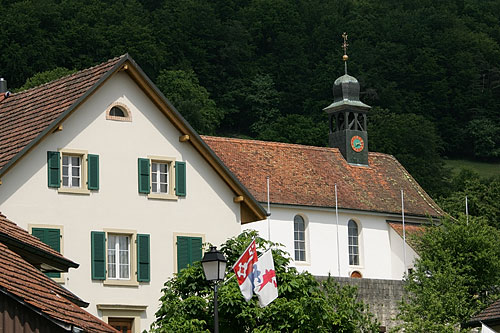
Village and church of Nenzlingen

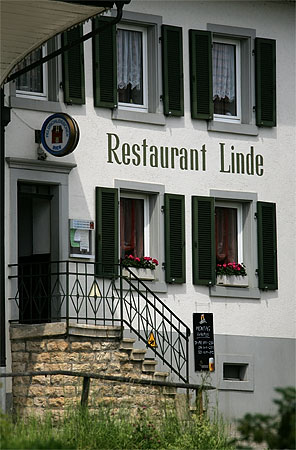
Restaurant Linden

Nenzlingen has a population (as of June 2021) of 457. As of 2008, 5.7% of the population are resident foreign nationals. Over the last 10 years (1997–2007) the population has changed at a rate of 12.6%.

Most of the population (as of 2000) speaks German (341 or 96.9%), with Italian language being second most common (7 or 2.0%) and French being third (2 or 0.6%).

As of 2008, the gender distribution of the population was 51.7% male and 48.3% female. The population was made up of 399 Swiss citizens (93.0% of the population), and 30 non-Swiss residents (7.0%) Of the population in the municipality 137 or about 38.9% were born in Nenzlingen and lived there in 2000. There were 68 or 19.3% who were born in the same canton, while 104 or 29.5% were born somewhere else in Switzerland, and 20 or 5.7% were born outside of Switzerland.

In 2008 there was 1 birth to non-Swiss citizens, and 1 death of a Swiss citizen. Ignoring immigration and emigration, the population of Swiss citizens decreased by 1 while the foreign population increased by 1. There were 3 non-Swiss men and 1 non-Swiss woman who immigrated from another country to Switzerland. The total Swiss population change in 2008 (from all sources, including moves across municipal borders) was an increase of 8 and the non-Swiss population change was an increase of 8 people. This represents a population growth rate of 4.0%.

The age distribution, as of 2010, in Nenzlingen is; 31 children or 7.2% of the population are between 0 and 6 years old and 74 teenagers or 17.2% are between 7 and 19. Of the adult population, 37 people or 8.6% of the population are between 20 and 29 years old. 47 people or 11.0% are between 30 and 39, 80 people or 18.6% are between 40 and 49, and 98 people or 22.8% are between 50 and 64. The senior population distribution is 46 people or 10.7% of the population are between 65 and 79 years old and there are 16 people or 3.7% who are over 80.

As of 2000, there were 127 people who were single and never married in the municipality. There were 187 married individuals, 22 widows or widowers and 16 individuals who are divorced.

As of 2000, there were 132 private households in the municipality, and an average of 2.6 persons per household. There were 26 households that consist of only one person and 11 households with five or more people. Out of a total of 135 households that answered this question, 19.3% were households made up of just one person and 1 were adults who lived with their parents. Of the rest of the households, there are 46 married couples without children, 55 married couples with children There were 4 single parents with a child or children.

In 2000 there were 83 single family homes (or 70.3% of the total) out of a total of 118 inhabited buildings. There were 13 multi-family buildings (11.0%), along with 16 multi-purpose buildings that were mostly used for housing (13.6%) and 6 other use buildings (commercial or industrial) that also had some housing (5.1%). Of the single family homes 11 were built before 1919, while 17 were built between 1990 and 2000. The greatest number of single family homes (18) were built between 1981 and 1990.

In 2000 there were 150 apartments in the municipality. The most common apartment size was 4 rooms of which there were 52. There were 3 single room apartments and 58 apartments with five or more rooms. Of these apartments, a total of 131 apartments (87.3% of the total) were permanently occupied, while 15 apartments (10.0%) were seasonally occupied and 4 apartments (2.7%) were empty.

As of 2007, the construction rate of new housing units was 2.5 new units per 1000 residents. The vacancy rate for the municipality, in 2008, was 0%.

The historical population is given in the following chart:

== Heritage sites of national significance ==
The Birsmatten-Basisgrotte, a Mesolithic settlement with burial sites, is listed as a Swiss heritage site of national significance.

== Politics ==
In the 2007 federal election the most popular party was the SVP which received 47.61% of the vote. The next three most popular parties were the SP (15.59%), the FDP (12.37%) and the CVP (11.12%). In the federal election, a total of 139 votes were cast, and the voter turnout was 46.0%.

== Economy ==
As of 2007, Nenzlingen had an unemployment rate of 2.06%. As of 2005, there were 25 people employed in the primary economic sector and about 9 businesses involved in this sector. 8 people were employed in the secondary sector and there were 2 businesses in this sector. 35 people were employed in the tertiary sector, with 9 businesses in this sector. There were 193 residents of the municipality who were employed in some capacity, of which females made up 44.0% of the workforce.

In 2008 the total number of full-time equivalent jobs was 39. The number of jobs in the primary sector was 13, of which 11 were in agriculture and 2 were in forestry or lumber production. The number of jobs in the secondary sector was 4, of which or (0.0%) were in manufacturing and 4 (100.0%) were in construction. The number of jobs in the tertiary sector was 22. In the tertiary sector; 7 or 31.8% were in wholesale or retail sales or the repair of motor vehicles, 2 or 9.1% were in a hotel or restaurant, 1 or 4.5% were the insurance or financial industry, 1 or 4.5% were technical professionals or scientists, 3 or 13.6% were in education and 5 or 22.7% were in health care.

In 2000, there were 13 workers who commuted into the municipality and 146 workers who commuted away. The municipality is a net exporter of workers, with about 11.2 workers leaving the municipality for every one entering. Of the working population, 10.4% used public transportation to get to work, and 56% used a private car.

== Religion ==
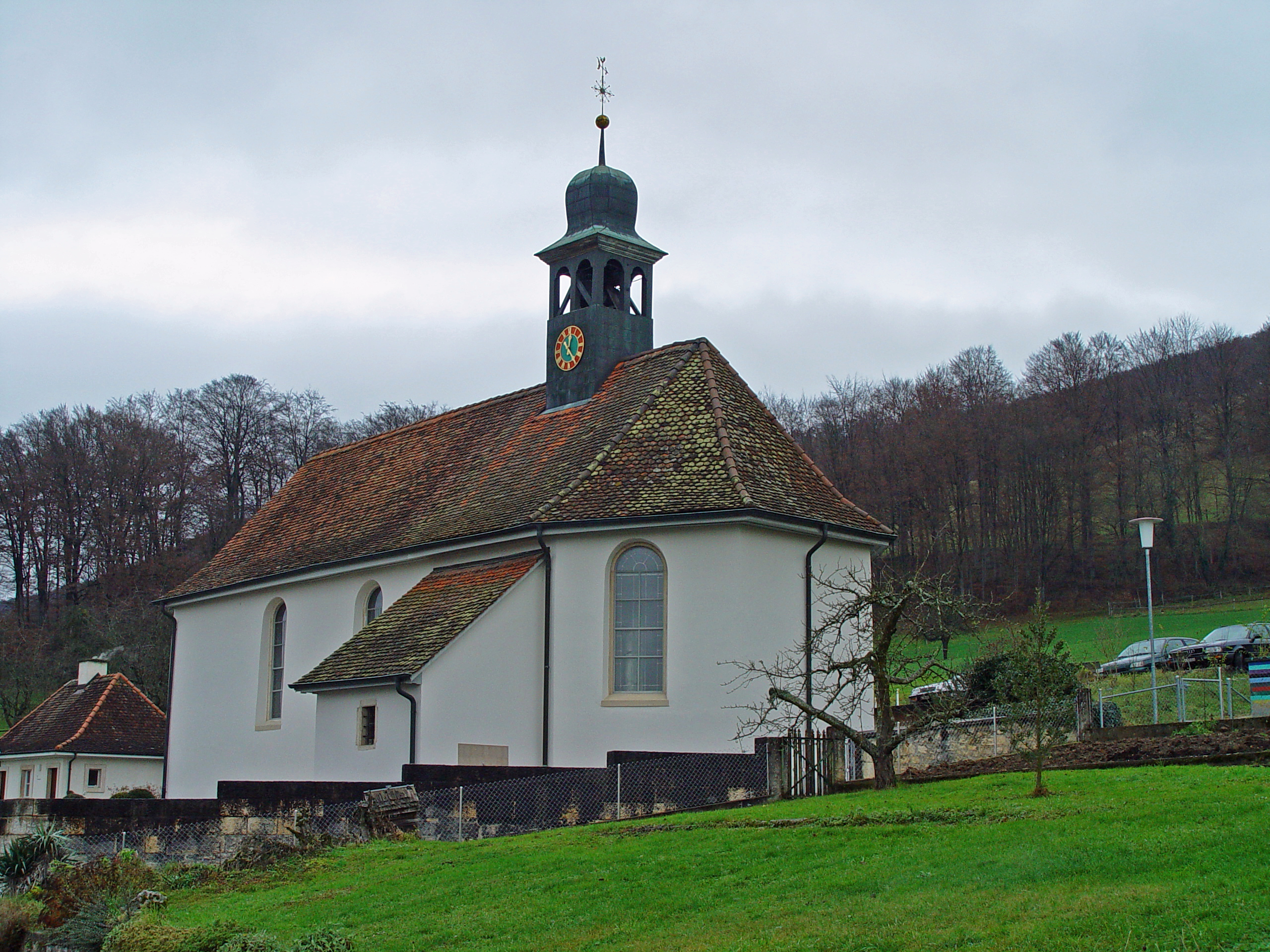
Church of Nenzlingen

From the 2000 census, 249 or 70.7% were Roman Catholic, while 41 or 11.6% belonged to the Swiss Reformed Church. Of the rest of the population, there were 3 individuals (or about 0.85% of the population) who belonged to the Christian Catholic Church, and there were 7 individuals (or about 1.99% of the population) who belonged to another Christian church. There were 38 (or about 10.80% of the population) who belonged to no church, are agnostic or atheist, and 14 individuals (or about 3.98% of the population) did not answer the question.

== Education ==
In Nenzlingen about 140 or (39.8%) of the population have completed non-mandatory upper secondary education, and 25 or (7.1%) have completed additional higher education (either university or a Fachhochschule). Of the 25 who completed tertiary schooling, 52.0% were Swiss men, 40.0% were Swiss women. As of 2000, there were 24 students from Nenzlingen who attended schools outside the municipality.
