= Grellingen =

- Municipality
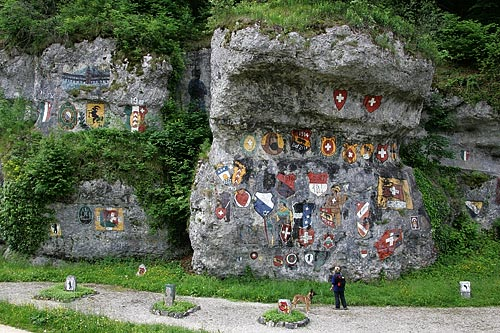

- Coat of arms
- Location of Grellingen
- Location within Switzerland Location within Canton of Basel-Landschaft
- Coordinates: 47°26′N 7°35′E
- Country: Switzerland
- Canton: Basel-Landschaft
- District: Laufen

Government
  - Mayor: Franz Meyer CVP/PDC

Area
  - Total: 3.31 km^{2} (1.28 sq mi)
- Elevation: 325 m (1,066 ft)

Population (June 2021)
  - Total: 1,896
  - Density: 573/km^{2} (1,480/sq mi)
- Time zone: UTC+01:00 (CET)
  - Summer (DST): UTC+02:00 (CEST)
- Postal code: 4203
- SFOS number: 2786
- ISO 3166 code: CH-BL
- Surrounded by: Brislach, Duggingen, Himmelried (SO), Nenzlingen, Pfeffingen
- Website: grellingen.ch

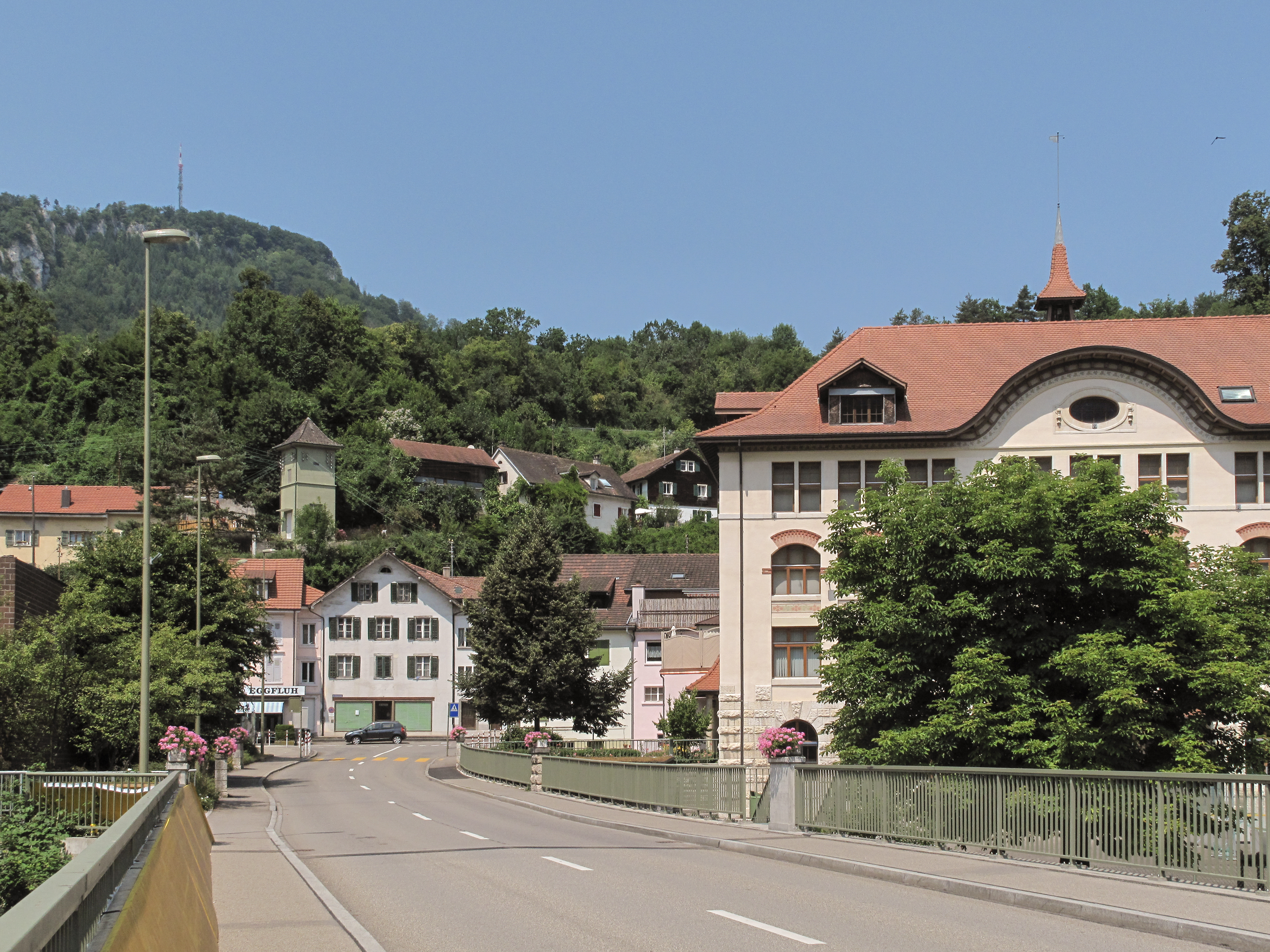
View to a street from bridge across river Birs

Grellingen is a municipality in the district of Laufen in the canton of Basel-Country in Switzerland. Grellingen is first mentioned in 1274 as Grellingen. The blazon of the municipal coat of arms is Per pale, Argent a Crozier Gules, Azure a Bar fleury Argent. Grellingen sits on the Basel–Biel/Bienne line and is served by local trains at Grellingen.

== Geography ==
Aerial view (1945)

Grellingen has an area, as of 2009, of 3.31 square kilometers (1.28 sq mi). Of this area, 0.69 km^{2} (0.27 sq mi) or 20.8% is used for agricultural purposes, while 1.89 km^{2} (0.73 sq mi) or 57.1% is forested. Of the rest of the land, 0.64 km^{2} (0.25 sq mi) or 19.3% is settled (buildings or roads), 0.11 km^{2} (27 acres) or 3.3% is either rivers or lakes.

Of the built up area, housing and buildings made up 12.1% and transportation infrastructure made up 3.6%. Power and water infrastructure as well as other special developed areas made up 1.5% of the area while parks, green belts and sports fields made up 1.2%. Out of the forested land, 54.4% of the total land area is heavily forested and 2.7% is covered with orchards or small clusters of trees. Of the agricultural land, 5.4% is used for growing crops and 11.5% is pastures, while 3.9% is used for orchards or vine crops. All the water in the municipality is flowing water.

The municipality is located in the Laufen district. It consists of the linear village of Grellingen in the Birs river valley.

== Demographics ==
Grellingen has a population (as of June 2021) of 1,896. As of 2008, 26.6% of the population are resident foreign nationals. Over the last 10 years (1997–2007) the population has changed at a rate of 5.5%.

Most of the population (as of 2000) speaks German (1,304 or 81.8%), with Albanian being second most common (76 or 4.8%) and Italian language being third (60 or 3.8%). There are 22 people who speak French, 3 people who speak Romansh, 9 people who speak Tamil and 3 people who speak Urdu/Hindi.

As of 2008, the gender distribution of the population was 51.8% male and 48.2% female. The population was made up of 1,265 Swiss citizens (73.1% of the population), and 466 non-Swiss residents (26.9%) Of the population in the municipality 456 or about 28.6% were born in Grellingen and lived there in 2000. There were 236 or 14.8% who were born in the same canton, while 436 or 27.3% were born somewhere else in Switzerland, and 417 or 26.1% were born outside of Switzerland.

In 2008 there were 8 live births to Swiss citizens and 4 births to non-Swiss citizens, and in same time span there were 10 deaths of Swiss citizens. Ignoring immigration and emigration, the population of Swiss citizens decreased by 2 while the foreign population increased by 4. There were 3 Swiss men and 5 Swiss women who emigrated from Switzerland. At the same time, there were 9 non-Swiss men and 6 non-Swiss women who immigrated from another country to Switzerland. The total Swiss population change in 2008 (from all sources, including moves across municipal borders) was an increase of 17 and the non-Swiss population change was a decrease of 11 people. This represents a population growth rate of 0.4%.

The age distribution, as of 2010, in Grellingen is; 105 children or 6.1% of the population are between 0 and 6 years old and 255 teenagers or 14.7% are between 7 and 19. Of the adult population, 197 people or 11.4% of the population are between 20 and 29 years old. 225 people or 13.0% are between 30 and 39, 316 people or 18.3% are between 40 and 49, and 397 people or 22.9% are between 50 and 64. The senior population distribution is 174 people or 10.1% of the population are between 65 and 79 years old and there are 62 people or 3.6% who are over 80.

As of 2000, there were 622 people who were single and never married in the municipality. There were 844 married individuals, 69 widows or widowers and 60 individuals who are divorced.

As of 2000, there were 655 private households in the municipality, and an average of 2.4 persons per household. There were 188 households that consist of only one person and 52 households with five or more people. Out of a total of 666 households that answered this question, 28.2% were households made up of just one person and 2 were adults who lived with their parents. Of the rest of the households, there are 200 married couples without children, 228 married couples with children There were 27 single parents with a child or children. There were 10 households that were made up unrelated people and 11 households that were made some sort of institution or another collective housing.

In 2000 there were 280 single family homes (or 68.3% of the total) out of a total of 410 inhabited buildings. There were 76 multi-family buildings (18.5%), along with 29 multi-purpose buildings that were mostly used for housing (7.1%) and 25 other use buildings (commercial or industrial) that also had some housing (6.1%). Of the single family homes 32 were built before 1919, while 33 were built between 1990 and 2000. The greatest number of single family homes (61) were built between 1981 and 1990.

In 2000 there were 706 apartments in the municipality. The most common apartment size was 3 rooms of which there were 217. There were 21 single room apartments and 213 apartments with five or more rooms. Of these apartments, a total of 627 apartments (88.8% of the total) were permanently occupied, while 56 apartments (7.9%) were seasonally occupied and 23 apartments (3.3%) were empty. As of 2007, the construction rate of new housing units was 8.8 new units per 1000 residents. As of 2000 the average price to rent a two-room apartment was about 739.00 CHF (US$590, £330, €470), a three-room apartment was about 850.00 CHF (US$680, £380, €540) and a four-room apartment cost an average of 1211.00 CHF (US$970, £540, €780). The vacancy rate for the municipality, in 2008, was 1.79%.

The historical population is given in the following chart:

== Politics ==
In the 2007 federal election the most popular party was the SVP which received 41.71% of the vote. The next three most popular parties were the SP (21.65%), the CVP (13.17%) and the FDP (12.85%). In the federal election, a total of 539 votes were cast, and the voter turnout was 53.1%.

== Economy ==
As of 2007, Grellingen had an unemployment rate of 2.67%. As of 2005, there were 7 people employed in the primary economic sector and about 4 businesses involved in this sector. 274 people were employed in the secondary sector and there were 18 businesses in this sector. 231 people were employed in the tertiary sector, with 50 businesses in this sector. There were 841 residents of the municipality who were employed in some capacity, of which females made up 38.5% of the workforce.

In 2008 the total number of full-time equivalent jobs was 420. The number of jobs in the primary sector was 2, all of which were in agriculture. The number of jobs in the secondary sector was 304, of which 251 or (82.6%) were in manufacturing and 53 (17.4%) were in construction. The number of jobs in the tertiary sector was 114. In the tertiary sector; 42 or 36.8% were in wholesale or retail sales or the repair of motor vehicles, 6 or 5.3% were in the movement and storage of goods, 22 or 19.3% were in a hotel or restaurant, 1 or 0.9% were in the information industry, 10 or 8.8% were technical professionals or scientists, 16 or 14.0% were in education and 2 or 1.8% were in health care.

In 2000, there were 476 workers who commuted into the municipality and 655 workers who commuted away. The municipality is a net exporter of workers, with about 1.4 workers leaving the municipality for every one entering. About 21.4% of the workforce coming into Grellingen are coming from outside Switzerland. Of the working population, 20.9% used public transportation to get to work, and 48.8% used a private car.

== Religion ==
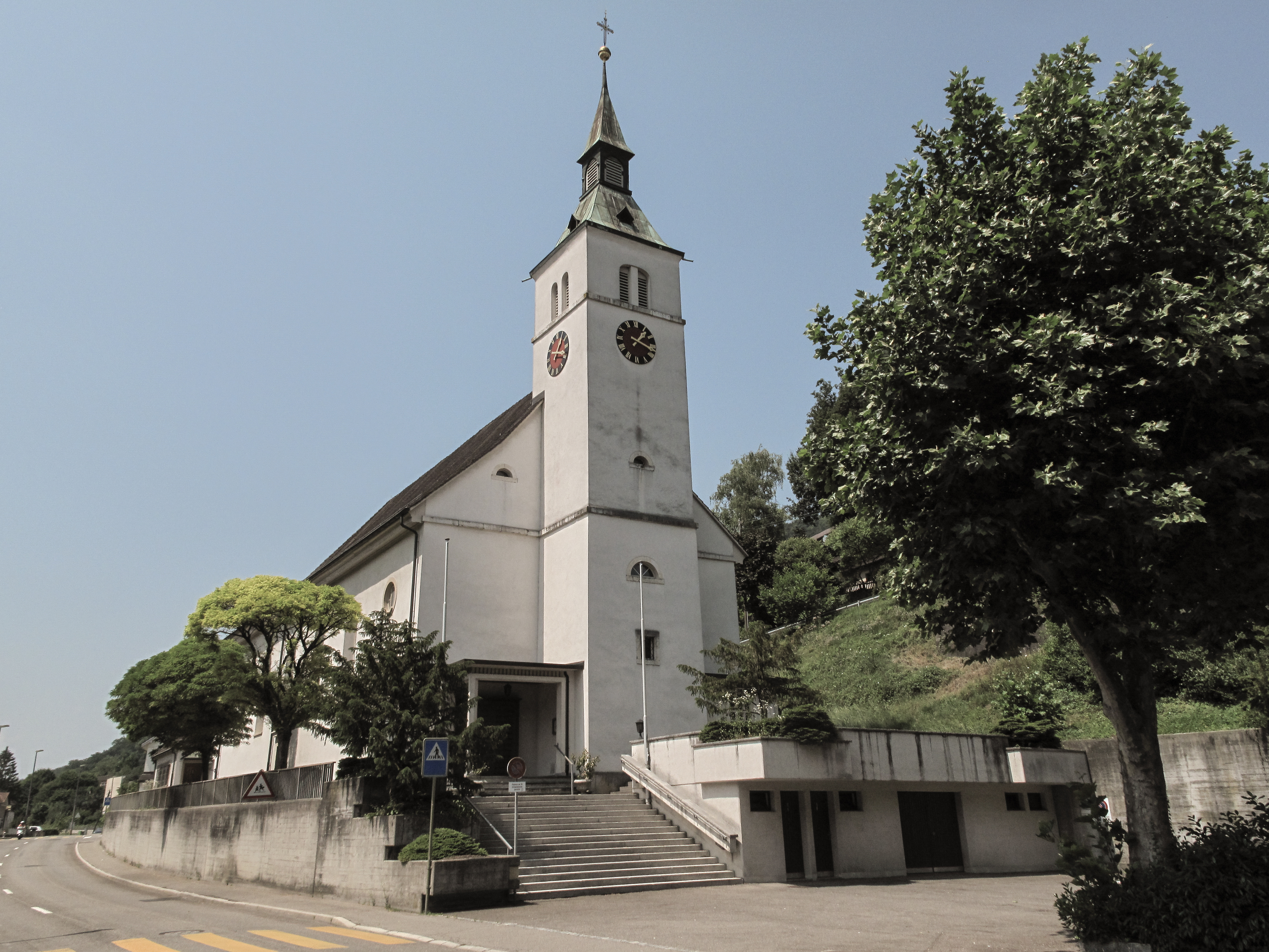
Grellingen, church: die Sankt Laurentiuskirche

From the 2000 census, 785 or 49.2% were Roman Catholic, while 274 or 17.2% belonged to the Swiss Reformed Church. Of the rest of the population, there were 21 members of an Orthodox church (or about 1.32% of the population), there were 3 individuals (or about 0.19% of the population) who belonged to the Christian Catholic Church, and there were 48 individuals (or about 3.01% of the population) who belonged to another Christian church. There were 194 (or about 12.16% of the population) who were Islamic. There were 2 individuals who were Buddhist, 16 individuals who were Hindu, 1 individual who belonged to another church. 199 (or about 12.48% of the population) belonged to no church, are agnostic or atheist, and 52 individuals (or about 3.26% of the population) did not answer the question.

== Education ==
In Grellingen about 582 or (36.5%) of the population have completed non-mandatory upper secondary education, and 141 or (8.8%) have completed additional higher education (either university or a Fachhochschule). Of the 141 who completed tertiary schooling, 62.4% were Swiss men, 27.0% were Swiss women, 8.5% were non-Swiss men. As of 2000, there were 58 students in Grellingen who came from another municipality, while 53 residents attended schools outside the municipality.
