= Burg im Leimental =

- Municipality
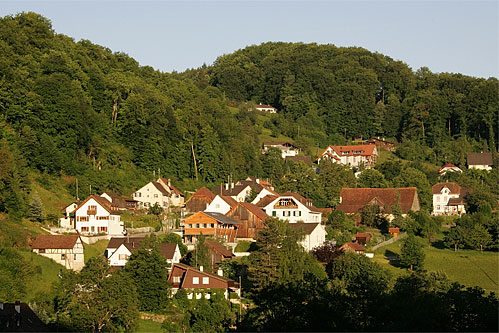

- Coat of arms
- Location of Burg im Leimental
- Location within Switzerland Location within Canton of Basel-Landschaft
- Coordinates: 47°27′N 7°26′E
- Country: Switzerland
- Canton: Basel-Landschaft
- District: Laufen

Area
  - Total: 2.83 km^{2} (1.09 sq mi)
- Elevation: 477 m (1,565 ft)

Population (June 2021)
  - Total: 281
  - Density: 99.3/km^{2} (257/sq mi)
- Time zone: UTC+01:00 (CET)
  - Summer (DST): UTC+02:00 (CEST)
- Postal code: 4117
- SFOS number: 2783
- ISO 3166 code: CH-BL
- Surrounded by: Biederthal (FR-68), Kleinlützel (SO), Metzerlen-Mariastein (SO), Röschenz, Wolschwiller (FR-68)
- Website: http://www.burg-il.ch SFSO statistics

Burg im Leimental is a municipality in the district of Laufen in the canton of Basel-Country in Switzerland.

== History ==
Burg im Leimental is first mentioned in 1168 as Biedertan though this was referring to Alt-Biederthal Castle. In 1520 it was mentioned as Bietterthal, in 1632 as Uf Burgthal and until, 1734 it was known by the French name La Bourg.

== Geography ==
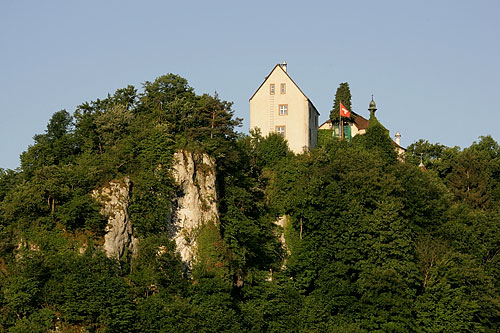
Leimental castle

Burg im Leimental has an area, as of 2009, of 2.83 square kilometers (1.09 sq mi). Of this area, 0.4 km^{2} (0.15 sq mi) or 14.1% is used for agricultural purposes, while 2.28 km^{2} (0.88 sq mi) or 80.6% is forested. Of the rest of the land, 0.14 km^{2} (35 acres) or 4.9% is settled (buildings or roads).

Of the built up area, housing and buildings made up 3.9% and transportation infrastructure made up 1.1%. Out of the forested land, 79.5% of the total land area is heavily forested and 1.1% is covered with orchards or small clusters of trees. Of the agricultural land, 0.0% is used for growing crops and 10.6% is pastures, while 3.5% is used for orchards or vine crops.

The municipality is located in the Laufen district, on the northern slope of the Blauen mountains. It is on the French border and along the route to the Roman era Remel Pass. It consists of the Haufendorf village (an irregular, unplanned and quite closely packed village, built around a central square) of Burg im Leimental.

== Coat of arms ==
The blazon of the municipal coat of arms is Argent, a Bar Sable between three Torteaux.

== Demographics ==
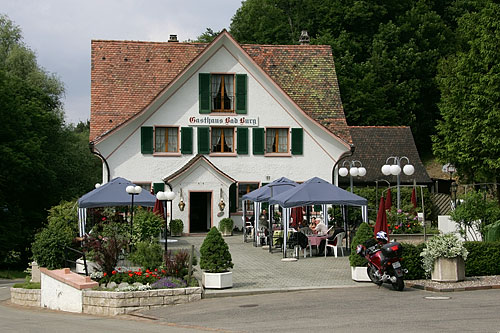
Hotel-Restaurant Bad Berg

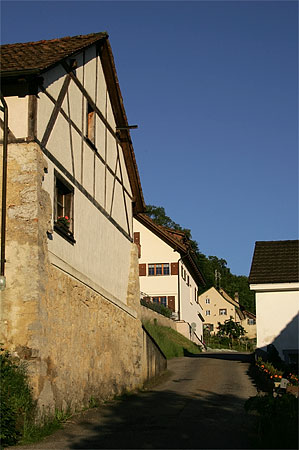
Houses in the village

Burg im Leimental has a population (as of June 2021) of 281. As of 2008, 10.1% of the population are resident foreign nationals. Over the last 10 years (1997–2007) the population has changed at a rate of -1.3%.

Most of the population (as of 2000) speaks German (217 or 94.8%), with English being second most common (6 or 2.6%) and French being third (2 or 0.9%).

As of 2008, the gender distribution of the population was 49.6% male and 50.4% female. The population was made up of 216 Swiss citizens (90.0% of the population), and 24 non-Swiss residents (10.0%). Of the population in the municipality 53 or about 23.1% were born in Burg im Leimental and lived there in 2000. There were 35 or 15.3% who were born in the same canton, while 103 or 45.0% were born somewhere else in Switzerland, and 32 or 14.0% were born outside of Switzerland.

In 2008 there were 4 live births to Swiss citizens and were 4 deaths of Swiss citizens. Ignoring immigration and emigration, the population of Swiss citizens remained the same while the foreign population remained the same. There was 1 Swiss man who immigrated back to Switzerland and 1 Swiss woman who emigrated from Switzerland. At the same time, there was 1 non-Swiss man and 1 non-Swiss woman who immigrated from another country to Switzerland. The total Swiss population change in 2008 (from all sources, including moves across municipal borders) was an increase of 1 and the non-Swiss population change was an increase of 5 people. This represents a population growth rate of 2.7%.

The age distribution, as of 2010, in Burg im Leimental is; 20 children or 8.3% of the population are between 0 and 6 years old and 31 teenagers or 12.9% are between 7 and 19. Of the adult population, 16 people or 6.7% of the population are between 20 and 29 years old. 36 people or 15.0% are between 30 and 39, 49 people or 20.4% are between 40 and 49, and 43 people or 17.9% are between 50 and 64. The senior population distribution is 35 people or 14.6% of the population are between 65 and 79 years old and there are 10 people or 4.2% who are over 80.

As of 2000, there were 94 people who were single and never married in the municipality. There were 110 married individuals, 14 widows or widowers and 11 individuals who are divorced.

As of 2000, there were 95 private households in the municipality, and an average of 2.4 persons per household. There were 25 households that consist of only one person and 6 households with five or more people. Out of a total of 97 households that answered this question, 25.8% were households made up of just one person. Of the rest of the households, there are 34 married couples without children, 29 married couples with children There were 5 single parents with a child or children. There were 2 households that were made up unrelated people and 2 households that were made some sort of institution or another collective housing.

In 2000 there were 61 single family homes (or 70.1% of the total) out of a total of 87 inhabited buildings. There were 10 multi-family buildings (11.5%), along with 14 multi-purpose buildings that were mostly used for housing (16.1%) and 2 other use buildings (commercial or industrial) that also had some housing (2.3%). Of the single family homes 17 were built before 1919, while 10 were built between 1990 and 2000.

In 2000 there were 104 apartments in the municipality. The most common apartment size was 5 rooms of which there were 30. There were single room apartments and 50 apartments with five or more rooms. Of these apartments, a total of 89 apartments (85.6% of the total) were permanently occupied, while 6 apartments (5.8%) were seasonally occupied and 9 apartments (8.7%) were empty. As of 2007, the construction rate of new housing units was 0 new units per 1000 residents. The vacancy rate for the municipality, in 2008, was 0.92%.

The historical population is given in the following chart:

== Heritage sites of national significance ==
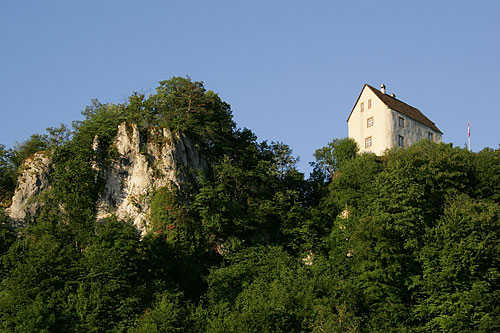
Castle with Chapel

The Castle with its chapel is listed as a Swiss heritage site of national significance. The entire village of Burg im Leimental is listed as part of the Inventory of Swiss Heritage Sites.

== Politics ==
In the 2007 federal election the most popular party was the SVP which received 32.95% of the vote. The next three most popular parties were the CVP (27.05%), the SP (19.81%) and the Green Party (10.29%). In the federal election, a total of 76 votes were cast, and the voter turnout was 45.0%.

== Economy ==
As of 2007, Burg im Leimental had an unemployment rate of 2.51%. As of 2005, there were 13 people employed in the primary economic sector and about 6 businesses involved in this sector. 6 people were employed in the secondary sector and there were 3 businesses in this sector. 15 people were employed in the tertiary sector, with 8 businesses in this sector. There were 125 residents of the municipality who were employed in some capacity, of which females made up 39.2% of the workforce.

In 2008 the total number of full-time equivalent jobs was 22. The number of jobs in the primary sector was 6, of which 5 were in agriculture and 1 was in forestry or lumber production. The number of jobs in the secondary sector was 3, all of which were in manufacturing. The number of jobs in the tertiary sector was 13. In the tertiary sector; 4 or 30.8% were in wholesale or retail sales or the repair of motor vehicles, 2 or 15.4% were in a hotel or restaurant, 2 or 15.4% were technical professionals or scientists, 2 or 15.4% were in education and 1 or 7.7% was in health care.

In 2000, there were 11 workers who commuted into the municipality and 92 workers who commuted away. The municipality is a net exporter of workers, with about 8.4 workers leaving the municipality for every one entering. About 36.4% of the workforce coming into Burg im Leimental are coming from outside Switzerland. Of the working population, 8.8% used public transportation to get to work, and 64.8% used a private car.

== Religion ==
From the 2000 census, 93 or 40.6% were Roman Catholic, while 59 or 25.8% belonged to the Swiss Reformed Church. Of the rest of the population, there was 1 member of an Orthodox church, and there were 14 individuals (or about 6.11% of the population) who belonged to another Christian church. There was 1 individual who was Islamic. 57 (or about 24.89% of the population) belonged to no church, are agnostic or atheist, and 4 individuals (or about 1.75% of the population) did not answer the question.

== Education ==
In Burg im Leimental about 105 or (45.9%) of the population have completed non-mandatory upper secondary education, and 41 or (17.9%) have completed additional higher education (either university or a Fachhochschule). Of the 41 who completed tertiary schooling, 63.4% were Swiss men, 19.5% were Swiss women. As of 2000, there were 13 students from Burg im Leimental who attended schools outside the municipality.

== Notable residents ==
Albert Hofmann, discoverer of lysergic acid diethylamide, died here, on 29 April 2008.
