= Röschenz =

- Municipality
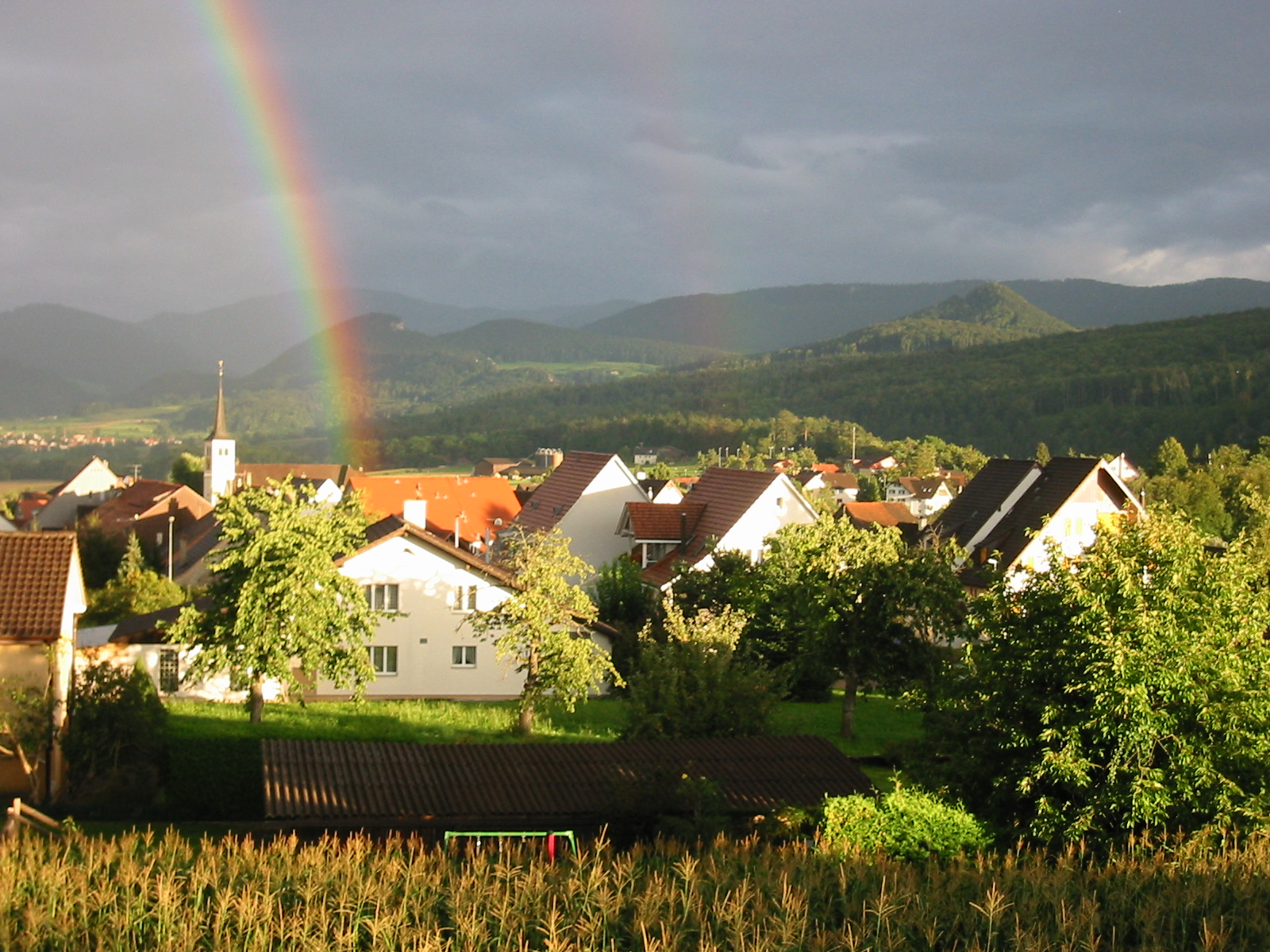

- Coat of arms
- Location of Röschenz
- Location within Switzerland Location within Canton of Basel-Landschaft
- Coordinates: 47°25′N 7°29′E
- Country: Switzerland
- Canton: Basel-Landschaft
- District: Laufen

Area
  - Total: 10.07 km^{2} (3.89 sq mi)
- Elevation: 450 m (1,480 ft)

Population (June 2021)
  - Total: 1,887
  - Density: 187.4/km^{2} (485.3/sq mi)
- Time zone: UTC+01:00 (CET)
  - Summer (DST): UTC+02:00 (CEST)
- Postal code: 4244
- SFOS number: 2791
- ISO 3166 code: CH-BL
- Surrounded by: Burg im Leimental, Dittingen, Kleinlützel (SO), Laufen, Liesberg, Metzerlen-Mariastein (SO)
- Website: roeschenz.ch

Röschenz is a municipality in Laufen District in the Canton of Basel-Landschaft in Switzerland.

== History ==
Röschenz is first mentioned in 1290 as de Roetschentzo. Until 1723 it was known as Reuschansse.

== Geography ==
Aerial view (1950)

Röschenz has an area, as of 2009, of 10.07 square kilometers (3.89 sq mi). Of this area, 3.26 km^{2} (1.26 sq mi) or 32.4% is used for agricultural purposes, while 6.04 km^{2} (2.33 sq mi) or 60.0% is forested. Of the rest of the land, 0.72 km^{2} (0.28 sq mi) or 7.1% is settled (buildings or roads), 0.02 km^{2} (4.9 acres) or 0.2% is either rivers or lakes and 0.02 km^{2} (4.9 acres) or 0.2% is unproductive land.

Of the built-up area, housing and buildings made up 4.5% and transportation infrastructure made up 2.0%. Out of the forested land, 58.8% of the total land area is heavily forested and 1.2% is covered with orchards or small clusters of trees. Of the agricultural land, 18.7% is used for growing crops and 12.8% is pastures. All the water in the municipality is flowing water.

The municipality is located in the Laufen district, in the Lützel valley on a terrasse in the Blauen hills. It consists of the linear village of Röschenz.

== Coat of arms ==
The blazon of the municipal coat of arms is Per pale, Sable a Crozier Argent, Argent between two Roses Gules, centered Or and lapped Vert a Bar wavy Azure.

== Demographics ==
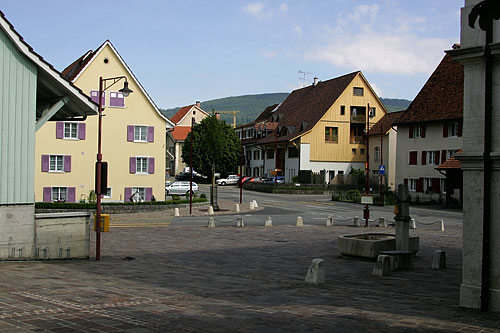
Houses around the village center

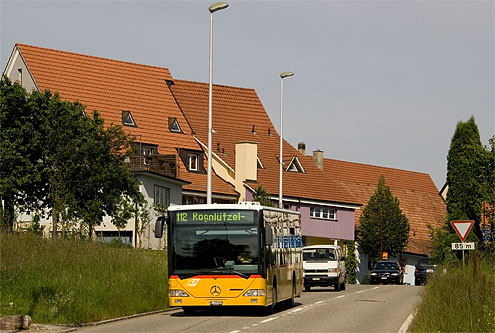
Bus traffic from Röschenz to Kleinlützel or Roggenburg

Röschenz has a population (as of June 2021) of 1,887. As of 2008, 7.2% of the population are resident foreign nationals. Over the last 10 years (1997–2007) the population has changed at a rate of 15.6%.

Most of the population (as of 2000) speaks German (1,526 or 94.9%), with French being second most common (17 or 1.1%) and Italian being third (14 or 0.9%).

As of 2008, the gender distribution of the population was 50.4% male and 49.6% female. The population was made up of 1,686 Swiss citizens (92.2% of the population), and 142 non-Swiss residents (7.8%) Of the population in the municipality 625 or about 38.9% were born in Röschenz and lived there in 2000. There were 393 or 24.4% who were born in the same canton, while 396 or 24.6% were born somewhere else in Switzerland, and 150 or 9.3% were born outside of Switzerland.

In 2008 there were 17 live births to Swiss citizens and were 13 deaths of Swiss citizens. Ignoring immigration and emigration, the population of Swiss citizens increased by 4 while the foreign population remained the same. There were 2 Swiss men who emigrated from Switzerland and 3 Swiss women who immigrated back to Switzerland. At the same time, there were 7 non-Swiss men who immigrated from another country to Switzerland and 1 non-Swiss woman who emigrated from Switzerland to another country. The total Swiss population change in 2008 (from all sources, including moves across municipal borders) was an increase of 19 and the non-Swiss population change was an increase of 4 people. his represents a population growth rate of 1.3%.

The age distribution, as of 2010, in Röschenz is; 149 children or 8.2% of the population are between 0 and 6 years old and 262 teenagers or 14.3% are between 7 and 19. Of the adult population, 202 people or 11.1% of the population are between 20 and 29 years old. 261 people or 14.3% are between 30 and 39, 324 people or 17.7% are between 40 and 49, and 382 people or 20.9% are between 50 and 64. The senior population distribution is 186 people or 10.2% of the population are between 65 and 79 years old and there are 62 people or 3.4% who are over 80.

As of 2000, there were 665 people who were single and never married in the municipality. There were 801 married individuals, 76 widows or widowers and 66 individuals who are divorced.

As of 2000, there were 633 private households in the municipality, and an average of 2.5 persons per household. There were 153 households that consist of only one person and 49 households with five or more people. Out of a total of 645 households that answered this question, 23.7% were households made up of just one person and 6 were adults who lived with their parents. Of the rest of the households, there are 201 married couples without children, 230 married couples with children. There were 32 single parents with a child or children. There were 11 households that were made up unrelated people and 12 households that were made some sort of institution or another collective housing.

In 2000 there were 376 single family homes (or 74.5% of the total) out of a total of 505 inhabited buildings. There were 80 multi-family buildings (15.8%), along with 35 multi-purpose buildings that were mostly used for housing (6.9%) and 14 other use buildings (commercial or industrial) that also had some housing (2.8%). Of the single-family homes, 20 were built before 1919, while 93 were built between 1990 and 2000. The greatest number of single family homes (65) were built between 1961 and 1970.

In 2000 there were 704 apartments in the municipality. The most common apartment size was 4 rooms of which there were 224. There were 16 single room apartments and 251 apartments with five or more rooms. Of these apartments, a total of 615 apartments (87.4% of the total) were permanently occupied, while 67 apartments (9.5%) were seasonally occupied and 22 apartments (3.1%) were empty. As of 2007, the construction rate of new housing units was 6.7 new units per 1000 residents. As of 2000 the average price to rent a two-room apartment was about 858.00 CHF (US$690, £390, €550), a three-room apartment was about 1115.00 CHF (US$890, £500, €710) and a four-room apartment cost an average of 1419.00 CHF (US$1140, £640, €910). The vacancy rate for the municipality, in 2008, was 0.13%.

The historical population is given in the following chart:

== Politics ==
In the 2007 Swiss federal election the most popular party was the SVP which received 26.27% of the vote. The next three most popular parties were the CVP (25.52%), the FDP (21.3%) and the SP (16.93%). In the federal election, a total of 706 votes were cast, and the voter turnout was 52.8%.

== Economy ==
As of 2007, Röschenz had an unemployment rate of 1.42%. As of 2005, there were 37 people employed in the primary economic sector and about 11 businesses involved in this sector. 58 people were employed in the secondary sector and there were 16 businesses in this sector. 140 people were employed in the tertiary sector, with 39 businesses in this sector. There were 828 residents of the municipality who were employed in some capacity, of which females made up 42.4% of the workforce.

In 2008 the total number of full-time equivalent jobs was 166. The number of jobs in the primary sector was 15, of which 14 were in agriculture and 1 were in forestry or lumber production. The number of jobs in the secondary sector was 55, of which 21 or (38.2%) were in manufacturing and 34 (61.8%) were in construction. The number of jobs in the tertiary sector was 96. In the tertiary sector; 14 or 14.6% were in wholesale or retail sales or the repair of motor vehicles, 19 or 19.8% were in the movement and storage of goods, 6 or 6.3% were in a hotel or restaurant, 7 or 7.3% were in the information industry, 12 or 12.5% were technical professionals or scientists, 18 or 18.8% were in education and 3 or 3.1% were in health care.

In 2000, there were 103 workers who commuted into the municipality and 691 workers who commuted away. The municipality is a net exporter of workers, with about 6.7 workers leaving the municipality for every one entering. About 15.5% of the workforce coming into Röschenz are coming from outside Switzerland. Of the working population, 19.6% used public transportation to get to work, and 56.8% used a private car.

== Religion ==
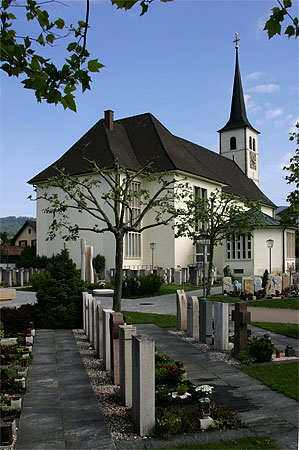
Village church

From the 2000 census, 1,198 or 74.5% were Roman Catholic, while 187 or 11.6% belonged to the Swiss Reformed Church. Of the rest of the population, there were 5 members of an Orthodox church (or about 0.31% of the population), there were 5 individuals (or about 0.31% of the population) who belonged to the Christian Catholic Church, and there were 22 individuals (or about 1.37% of the population) who belonged to another Christian church. There was 1 individual who was Jewish, and 24 (or about 1.49% of the population) who were Islamic. There were 2 individuals who were Buddhist and 2 individuals who belonged to another church. 122 (or about 7.59% of the population) belonged to no church, are agnostic or atheist, and 40 individuals (or about 2.49% of the population) did not answer the question.

== Education ==
In Röschenz about 641 or (39.9%) of the population have completed non-mandatory upper secondary education, and 156 or (9.7%) have completed additional higher education (either university or a Fachhochschule). Of the 156 who completed tertiary schooling, 70.5% were Swiss men, 21.2% were Swiss women, 5.1% were non-Swiss men and 3.2% were non-Swiss women. As of 2000, there were 4 students in Röschenz who came from another municipality, while 119 residents attended schools outside the municipality.
