= Blauen, Basel-Landschaft =

Blauen
- Municipality
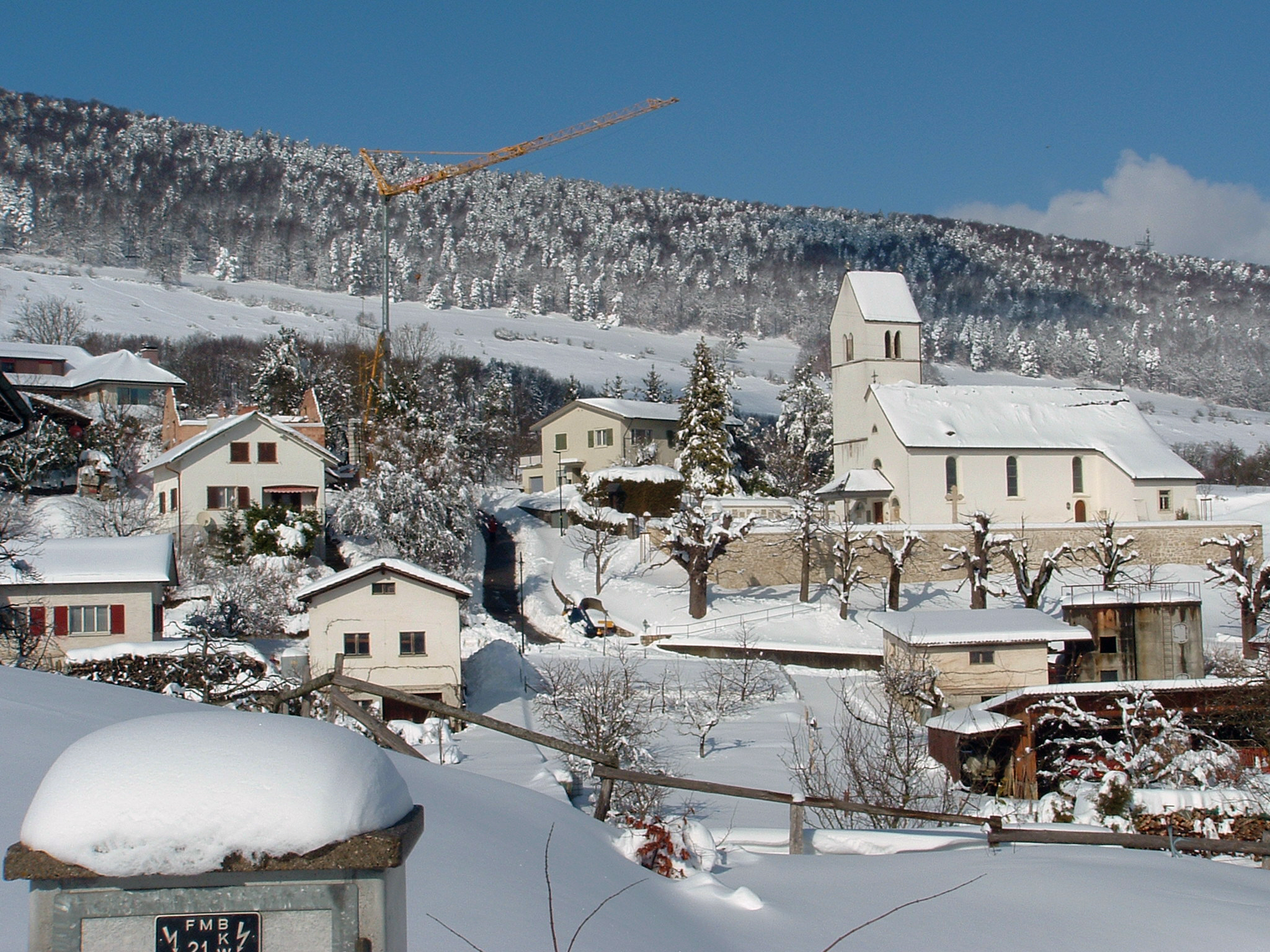

- Flag Coat of arms
- Location of Blauen
- Location within Switzerland Location within Canton of Basel-Landschaft
- Coordinates: 47°27′N 7°31′E
- Country: Switzerland
- Canton: Basel-Landschaft
- District: Laufen

Area
  - Total: 7.13 km^{2} (2.75 sq mi)
- Elevation: 533 m (1,749 ft)

Population (June 2021)
  - Total: 705
  - Density: 98.9/km^{2} (256/sq mi)
- Time zone: UTC+01:00 (CET)
  - Summer (DST): UTC+02:00 (CEST)
- Postal code: 4223
- SFOS number: 2781
- ISO 3166 code: CH-BL
- Surrounded by: Dittingen, Ettingen, Hofstetten-Flüh (SO), Metzerlen-Mariastein (SO), Nenzlingen, Pfeffingen, Zwingen
- Website: blauen.ch

Blauen is a municipality in the district of Laufen in the canton of Basel-Country in Switzerland.

== History ==
Blauen is first mentioned in 1147 as Blakwan.

== Geography ==
Aerial view (1950)

Blauen has an area, as of 2009, of 7.13 square kilometers (2.75 sq mi). Of this area, 2.42 km^{2} (0.93 sq mi) or 33.9% is used for agricultural purposes, while 4.29 km^{2} (1.66 sq mi) or 60.2% is forested. Of the rest of the land, 0.38 km^{2} (0.15 sq mi) or 5.3% is settled (buildings or roads) and 0.02 km^{2} (4.9 acres) or 0.3% is unproductive land.

Of the built up area, housing and buildings made up 3.5% and transportation infrastructure made up 1.5%. Out of the forested land, 58.6% of the total land area is heavily forested and 1.5% is covered with orchards or small clusters of trees. Of the agricultural land, 12.9% is used for growing crops and 12.9% is pastures, while 2.7% is used for orchards or vine crops and 5.5% is used for alpine pastures.

The municipality is located in the Laufen district, on the southern slope of the Blauen mountains.

== Coat of arms ==
The blazon of the municipal coat of arms is Or, a Bar Sable, in chief a Mullet of the same.

== Demographics ==
Blauen has a population (as of June 2021) of 705. As of 2008, 4.8% of the population are resident foreign nationals. Over the last 10 years (1997–2007) the population has changed at a rate of 4.2%.

Most of the population (as of 2000) speaks German (641 or 97.1%), with French being second most common (10 or 1.5%) and Finnish being third (2 or 0.3%).

As of 2008, the gender distribution of the population was 49.3% male and 50.7% female. The population was made up of 650 Swiss citizens (94.2% of the population), and 40 non-Swiss residents (5.8%) Of the population in the municipality 276 or about 41.8% were born in Blauen and lived there in 2000. There were 141 or 21.4% who were born in the same canton, while 188 or 28.5% were born somewhere else in Switzerland, and 54 or 8.2% were born outside of Switzerland.

In 2008 there were 9 live births to Swiss citizens and 1 birth to non-Swiss citizens, and in same time span there were 4 deaths of Swiss citizens. Ignoring immigration and emigration, the population of Swiss citizens increased by 5 while the foreign population increased by 1. There were 2 Swiss women who immigrated back to Switzerland. At the same time, there was 1 non-Swiss man and 1 non-Swiss woman who immigrated from another country to Switzerland. The total Swiss population change in 2008 (from all sources, including moves across municipal borders) was an increase of 12 and the non-Swiss population remained the same. This represents a population growth rate of 1.8%.

The age distribution, as of 2010, in Blauen is; 36 children or 5.2% of the population are between 0 and 6 years old and 100 teenagers or 14.5% are between 7 and 19. Of the adult population, 71 people or 10.3% of the population are between 20 and 29 years old. 94 people or 13.6% are between 30 and 39, 111 people or 16.1% are between 40 and 49, and 169 people or 24.5% are between 50 and 64. The senior population distribution is 92 people or 13.3% of the population are between 65 and 79 years old and there are 17 people or 2.5% who are over 80.

As of 2000, there were 266 people who were single and never married in the municipality. There were 345 married individuals, 25 widows or widowers and 24 individuals who are divorced.

As of 2000, there were 241 private households in the municipality, and an average of 2.7 persons per household. There were 41 households that consist of only one person and 23 households with five or more people. Out of a total of 241 households that answered this question, 17.0% were households made up of just one person. Of the rest of the households, there are 82 married couples without children, 103 married couples with children There were 12 single parents with a child or children. There were 3 households that were made up unrelated people.

In 2000 there were 196 single-family homes (or 81.7% of the total) out of a total of 240 inhabited buildings. There were 15 multi-family buildings (6.3%), along with 25 multi-purpose buildings that were mostly used for housing (10.4%) and 4 other-use buildings (commercial or industrial) that also had some housing (1.7%). Of the single-family homes 12 were built before 1919, while 32 were built between 1990 and 2000. The greatest number of single-family homes (50) were built between 1981 and 1990.

In 2000 there were 267 apartments in the municipality. The most common apartment size was 4 rooms of which there were 80. There were 3 single-room apartments and 115 apartments with five or more rooms. Of these apartments, a total of 238 apartments (89.1% of the total) were permanently occupied, while 23 apartments (8.6%) were seasonally occupied and 6 apartments (2.2%) were empty. As of 2007, the construction rate of new housing units was 0 new units per 1000 residents. The vacancy rate for the municipality, in 2008, was 0%.

The historical population is given in the following chart:

== Politics ==
In the 2007 federal election the most popular party was the SVP which received 34.46% of the vote. The next three most popular parties were the CVP (24.82%), the Green Party (13.71%) and the SP (13.56%). In the federal election, a total of 296 votes were cast, and the voter turnout was 55.0%.

== Economy ==
As of 2007, Blauen had an unemployment rate of 2.68%. As of 2005, there were 22 people employed in the primary economic sector and about 10 businesses involved in this sector. 70 people were employed in the secondary sector and there were 7 businesses in this sector. 35 people were employed in the tertiary sector, with 13 businesses in this sector. There were 350 residents of the municipality who were employed in some capacity, of which females made up 39.7% of the workforce.

In 2008 the total number of full-time equivalent jobs was 45. The number of jobs in the primary sector was 9, all of which were in agriculture. The number of jobs in the secondary sector was 12, of which 5 or (41.7%) were in manufacturing and 7 (58.3%) were in construction. The number of jobs in the tertiary sector was 24. In the tertiary sector; 4 or 16.7% were in wholesale or retail sales or the repair of motor vehicles, 10 or 41.7% were in a hotel or restaurant, 2 or 8.3% were technical professionals or scientists, 3 or 12.5% were in education.

In 2000, there were 80 workers who commuted into the municipality and 282 workers who commuted away. The municipality is a net exporter of workers, with about 3.5 workers leaving the municipality for every one entering. Of the working population, 13.1% used public transportation to get to work, and 67.7% used a private car.

== Religion ==
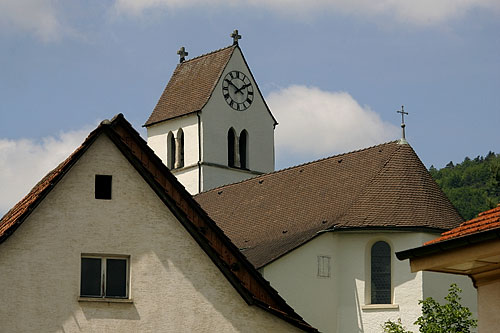
Parish Church of St. Martin

From the 2000 census, 433 or 65.6% were Roman Catholic, while 120 or 18.2% belonged to the Swiss Reformed Church. Of the rest of the population, and there were 14 individuals (or about 2.12% of the population) who belonged to another Christian church. There was 1 individual who was Islamic. There was 1 individual who was Buddhist and 89 (or about 13.48% of the population) belonged to no church, are agnostic or atheist, and 2 individuals (or about 0.30% of the population) did not answer the question.

== Education ==
In Blauen about 279 or (42.3%) of the population have completed non-mandatory upper secondary education, and 78 or (11.8%) have completed additional higher education (either university or a Fachhochschule). Of the 78 who completed tertiary schooling, 70.5% were Swiss men, 17.9% were Swiss women, 10.3% were non-Swiss men. As of 2000, there were 2 students in Blauen who came from another municipality, while 69 residents attended schools outside the municipality.
