= Brislach =

- Municipality
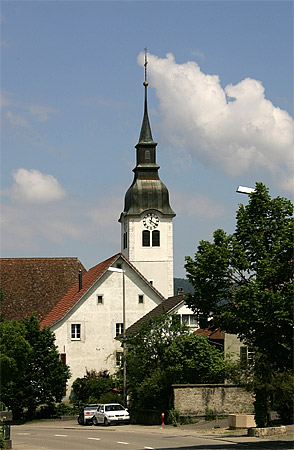

- Coat of arms
- Location of Brislach
- Location within Switzerland Location within Canton of Basel-Landschaft
- Coordinates: 47°25′N 7°33′E
- Country: Switzerland
- Canton: Basel-Landschaft
- District: Laufen

Area
  - Total: 9.39 km^{2} (3.63 sq mi)
- Elevation: 373 m (1,224 ft)

Population (June 2021)
  - Total: 1,722
  - Density: 183/km^{2} (475/sq mi)
- Time zone: UTC+01:00 (CET)
  - Summer (DST): UTC+02:00 (CEST)
- Postal code: 4225
- SFOS number: 2782
- ISO 3166 code: CH-BL
- Surrounded by: Breitenbach (SO), Grellingen, Himmelried (SO), Laufen, Nenzlingen, Wahlen bei Laufen, Zwingen
- Website: brislach.ch

Brislach is a municipality in the district of Laufen in the canton of Basel-Country in Switzerland.

== History ==
Brislach is first mentioned in 1144 as Brislacho.

== Geography ==
Aerial view (1953)

Brislach has an area, as of 2009, of 9.39 square kilometers (3.63 sq mi). Of this area, 4.96 km^{2} (1.92 sq mi) or 52.8% is used for agricultural purposes, while 3.55 km^{2} (1.37 sq mi) or 37.8% is forested. Of the rest of the land, 0.8 km^{2} (0.31 sq mi) or 8.5% is settled (buildings or roads), 0.06 km^{2} (15 acres) or 0.6% is either rivers or lakes.

Of the built up area, housing and buildings made up 4.4% and transportation infrastructure made up 2.7%. Out of the forested land, 36.4% of the total land area is heavily forested and 1.4% is covered with orchards or small clusters of trees. Of the agricultural land, 39.6% is used for growing crops and 12.5% is pastures. All the water in the municipality is flowing water.

The municipality is located in the Laufen district. It consists of the linear village of Brislach on the Birstal-Passwang road.

== Coat of arms ==
The blazon of the municipal coat of arms is Or, two Battons fleury Gules in saltire.

== Demographics ==
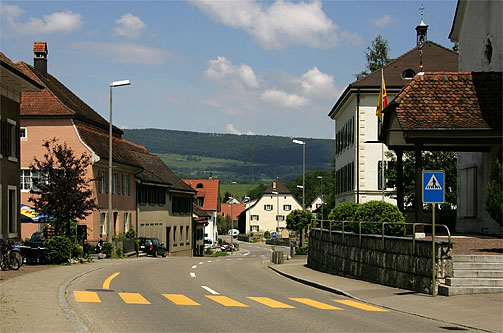
Breitenbacherstrasse in Brislach

Brislach has a population (as of June 2021) of 1,722. As of 2008, 9.1% of the population are resident foreign nationals. Over the last 10 years (1997–2007) the population has changed at a rate of 19.5%.

Most of the population (as of 2000) speaks German (1,327 or 95.3%), with Italian language being second most common (16 or 1.1%) and Albanian being third (8 or 0.6%). There are seven people who speak French and people who speak Romansh.

As of 2008, the gender distribution of the population was 50.8% male and 49.2% female. The population was made up of 1,454 Swiss citizens (90.1% of the population), and 160 non-Swiss residents (9.9%) Of the population in the municipality 507 or about 36.4% were born in Brislach and lived there in 2000. There were 261 or 18.8% who were born in the same canton, while 468 or 33.6% were born somewhere else in Switzerland, and 116 or 8.3% were born outside of Switzerland.

In 2008 there were 14 live births to Swiss citizens and 1 birth to non-Swiss citizens, and in same time span there were 9 deaths of Swiss citizens. Ignoring immigration and emigration, the population of Swiss citizens increased by 5 while the foreign population increased by 1. There was 1 Swiss man and 2 Swiss women who emigrated from Switzerland. At the same time, there were 6 non-Swiss men and 3 non-Swiss women who immigrated from another country to Switzerland. The total Swiss population change in 2008 (from all sources, including moves across municipal borders) was an increase of 1 and the non-Swiss population change was an increase of 31 people. This represents a population growth rate of 2.1%.

The age distribution, as of 2010, in Brislach is; 110 children or 6.8% of the population are between 0 and 6 years old and 286 teenagers or 17.7% are between 7 and 19. Of the adult population, 174 people or 10.8% of the population are between 20 and 29 years old. 216 people or 13.4% are between 30 and 39, 296 people or 18.3% are between 40 and 49, and 304 people or 18.8% are between 50 and 64. The senior population distribution is 172 people or 10.7% of the population are between 65 and 79 years old and there are 56 people or 3.5% who are over 80.

As of 2000, there were 556 people who were single and never married in the municipality. There were 721 married individuals, 68 widows or widowers and 47 individuals who are divorced.

As of 2000, there were 536 private households in the municipality, and an average of 2.6 persons per household. There were 127 households that consist of only one person and 38 households with five or more people. Out of a total of 542 households that answered this question, 23.4% were households made up of just one person and 4 were adults who lived with their parents. Of the rest of the households, there are 170 married couples without children, 212 married couples with children There were 15 single parents with a child or children. There were 8 households that were made up unrelated people and 6 households that were made some sort of institution or another collective housing.

In 2000 there were 319 single family homes (or 75.1% of the total) out of a total of 425 inhabited buildings. There were 46 multi-family buildings (10.8%), along with 48 multi-purpose buildings that were mostly used for housing (11.3%) and 12 other use buildings (commercial or industrial) that also had some housing (2.8%). Of the single-family homes 14 were built before 1919, while 92 were built between 1990 and 2000. The greatest number of single family homes (76) were built between 1981 and 1990.

In 2000 there were 563 apartments in the municipality. The most common apartment size was 4 rooms of which there were 171. There were 13 single room apartments and 251 apartments with five or more rooms. Of these apartments, a total of 524 apartments (93.1% of the total) were permanently occupied, while 31 apartments (5.5%) were seasonally occupied and 8 apartments (1.4%) were empty. As of 2007, the construction rate of new housing units was 8.3 new units per 1000 residents. As of 2000 the average price to rent a two-room apartment was about 723.00 CHF (US$580, £330, €460), a three-room apartment was about 1033.00 CHF (US$830, £460, €660) and a four-room apartment cost an average of 1206.00 CHF (US$960, £540, €770). The vacancy rate for the municipality, in 2008, was 0.79%.

The historical population is given in the following chart:

== Heritage sites of national significance ==
The Kohlerhöhle, a Paleolithic cave dwelling, is listed as a Swiss heritage site of national significance.

== Politics ==
In the 2007 federal election the most popular party was the SVP which received 38.18% of the vote. The next three most popular parties were the FDP (17.65%), the CVP (16.53%) and the SP (16.06%). In the federal election, a total of 464 votes were cast, and the voter turnout was 42.0%.

== Economy ==
As of 2007, Brislach had an unemployment rate of 1.69%. As of 2005, there were 47 people employed in the primary economic sector and about 14 businesses involved in this sector. 159 people were employed in the secondary sector and there were 17 businesses in this sector. 103 people were employed in the tertiary sector, with 24 businesses in this sector. There were 736 residents of the municipality who were employed in some capacity, of which females made up 38.9% of the workforce.

In 2008 the total number of full-time equivalent jobs was 265. The number of jobs in the primary sector was 26, all of which were in agriculture. The number of jobs in the secondary sector was 151, of which 82 or (54.3%) were in manufacturing and 69 (45.7%) were in construction. The number of jobs in the tertiary sector was 88. In the tertiary sector; 24 or 27.3% were in wholesale or retail sales or the repair of motor vehicles, 16 or 18.2% were in the movement and storage of goods, 11 or 12.5% were in a hotel or restaurant, 17 or 19.3% were technical professionals or scientists, 9 or 10.2% were in education and 4 or 4.5% were in health care.

In 2000, there were 265 workers who commuted into the municipality and 578 workers who commuted away. The municipality is a net exporter of workers, with about 2.2 workers leaving the municipality for every one entering. About 14.3% of the workforce coming into Brislach are coming from outside Switzerland. Of the working population, 15.9% used public transportation to get to work, and 54.3% used a private car.

== Religion ==
From the 2000 census, 983 or 70.6% were Roman Catholic, while 210 or 15.1% belonged to the Swiss Reformed Church. Of the rest of the population, there were 2 members of an Orthodox church (or about 0.14% of the population), and there were 19 individuals (or about 1.36% of the population) who belonged to another Christian church. There were 23 (or about 1.65% of the population) who were Islamic. There were 3 individuals who were Buddhist, 8 individuals who were Hindu and 1 individual who belonged to another church. 114 (or about 8.19% of the population) belonged to no church, are agnostic or atheist, and 29 individuals (or about 2.08% of the population) did not answer the question.

== Education ==
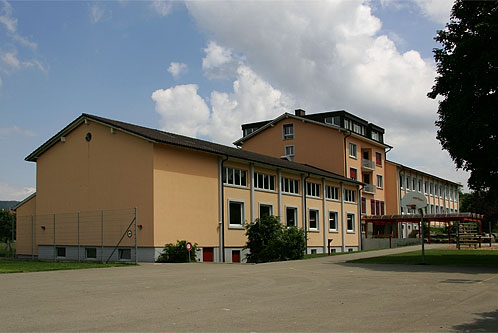
School house in Brislach

In Brislach about 564 or (40.5%) of the population have completed non-mandatory upper secondary education, and 106 or (7.6%) have completed additional higher education (either university or a Fachhochschule). Of the 106 who completed tertiary schooling, 70.8% were Swiss men, 22.6% were Swiss women, 4.7% were non-Swiss men. As of 2000, there were 17 students in Brislach who came from another municipality, while 112 residents attended schools outside the municipality.
