= Dittingen =

- Municipality
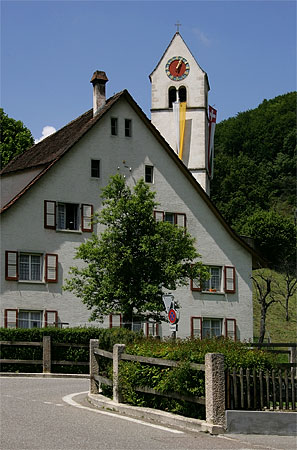

- Coat of arms
- Location of Dittingen
- Location within Switzerland Location within Canton of Basel-Landschaft
- Coordinates: 47°26′N 7°30′E
- Country: Switzerland
- Canton: Basel-Landschaft
- District: Laufen

Area
  - Total: 6.75 km^{2} (2.61 sq mi)
- Elevation: 404 m (1,325 ft)

Population (June 2021)
  - Total: 738
  - Density: 109/km^{2} (283/sq mi)
- Time zone: UTC+01:00 (CET)
  - Summer (DST): UTC+02:00 (CEST)
- Postal code: 4243
- SFOS number: 2784
- ISO 3166 code: CH-BL
- Surrounded by: Blauen, Laufen, Metzerlen-Mariastein (SO), Röschenz, Zwingen
- Website: dittingen.ch

Dittingen is a municipality in the district of Laufen in the canton of Basel-Country in Switzerland.

== History ==
Dittingen is first mentioned in shortly before 1300 as Tittingen.

== Geography ==
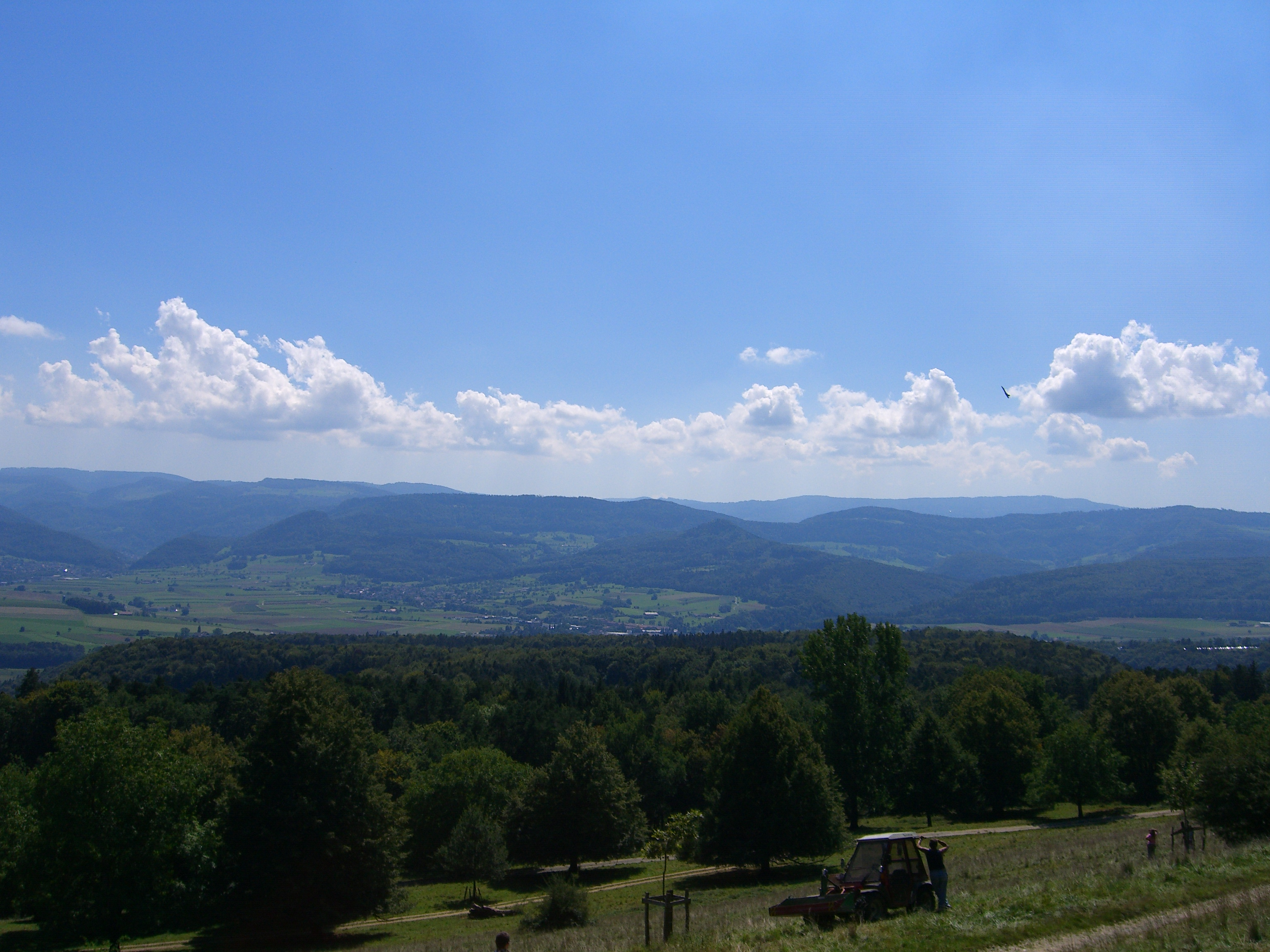
Countryside around Dittingen

Aerial view from 500 m by Walter Mittelholzer (1922)

Dittingen has an area, as of 2009, of 6.75 square kilometers (2.61 sq mi). Of this area, 1.99 km^{2} (0.77 sq mi) or 29.5% is used for agricultural purposes, while 4.2 km^{2} (1.6 sq mi) or 62.2% is forested. Of the rest of the land, 0.49 km^{2} (0.19 sq mi) or 7.3% is settled (buildings or roads), 0.03 km^{2} (7.4 acres) or 0.4% is either rivers or lakes and 0.03 km^{2} (7.4 acres) or 0.4% is unproductive land.

Of the built up area, housing and buildings made up 2.2% and transportation infrastructure made up 3.0%. Power and water infrastructure as well as other special developed areas made up 1.2% of the area Out of the forested land, 59.6% of the total land area is heavily forested and 2.7% is covered with orchards or small clusters of trees. Of the agricultural land, 10.2% is used for growing crops and 12.7% is pastures, while 2.4% is used for orchards or vine crops and 4.1% is used for alpine pastures. All the water in the municipality is flowing water.

The municipality is located in the Laufen district, in a side valley off the Birs river valley.

== Coat of arms ==
The blazon of the municipal coat of arms is Argent, a Saint passant robed Sable, haloed and carrying a bag and a staff, and wearing sandals Or, on a Base Vert between two trees of the same trunked Gules.

== Demographics ==
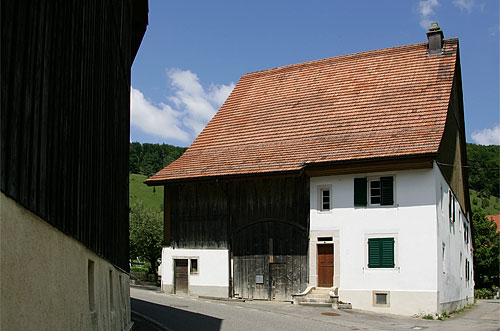
House in Dittingen

Dittingen has a population (as of June 2021) of 738. As of 2008, 9.2% of the population are resident foreign nationals. Over the last 10 years (1997–2007) the population has changed at a rate of 1.6%.

Most of the population (as of 2000) speaks German (634 or 92.4%), with Albanian being second most common (15 or 2.2%) and Spanish being third (14 or 2.0%). There are 7 people who speak French and 1 person who speaks Romansh.

As of 2008, the gender distribution of the population was 48.1% male and 51.9% female. The population was made up of 641 Swiss citizens (89.3% of the population), and 77 non-Swiss residents (10.7%) Of the population in the municipality 270 or about 39.4% were born in Dittingen and lived there in 2000. There were 173 or 25.2% who were born in the same canton, while 158 or 23.0% were born somewhere else in Switzerland, and 71 or 10.3% were born outside of Switzerland.

In 2008 there were 5 live births to Swiss citizens and 1 birth to non-Swiss citizens, and in same time span there were 4 deaths of Swiss citizens. Ignoring immigration and emigration, the population of Swiss citizens increased by 1 while the foreign population increased by 1. There were 2 Swiss men and 2 Swiss women who immigrated back to Switzerland. At the same time, there was 1 non-Swiss woman who immigrated from another country to Switzerland. The total Swiss population change in 2008 (from all sources, including moves across municipal borders) was a decrease of 5 and the non-Swiss population remained the same. This represents a population growth rate of -0.7%.

The age distribution, as of 2010, in Dittingen is; 39 children or 5.4% of the population are between 0 and 6 years old and 103 teenagers or 14.3% are between 7 and 19. Of the adult population, 65 people or 9.1% of the population are between 20 and 29 years old. 101 people or 14.1% are between 30 and 39, 126 people or 17.5% are between 40 and 49, and 135 people or 18.8% are between 50 and 64. The senior population distribution is 120 people or 16.7% of the population are between 65 and 79 years old and there are 29 people or 4.0% who are over 80.

As of 2000, there were 265 people who were single and never married in the municipality. There were 344 married individuals, 49 widows or widowers and 28 individuals who are divorced.

As of 2000, there were 298 private households in the municipality, and an average of 2.3 persons per household. There were 87 households that consist of only one person and 17 households with five or more people. Out of a total of 301 households that answered this question, 28.9% were households made up of just one person and 5 were adults who lived with their parents. Of the rest of the households, there are 107 married couples without children, 81 married couples with children There were 16 single parents with a child or children. There were 2 households that were made up unrelated people and 3 households that were made some sort of institution or another collective housing.

In 2000 there were 149 single family homes (or 69.6% of the total) out of a total of 214 inhabited buildings. There were 30 multi-family buildings (14.0%), along with 28 multi-purpose buildings that were mostly used for housing (13.1%) and 7 other use buildings (commercial or industrial) that also had some housing (3.3%). Of the single family homes 22 were built before 1919, while 25 were built between 1990 and 2000. The greatest number of single family homes (32) were built between 1961 and 1970.

In 2000 there were 313 apartments in the municipality. The most common apartment size was 4 rooms of which there were 86. There were 7 single room apartments and 121 apartments with five or more rooms. Of these apartments, a total of 286 apartments (91.4% of the total) were permanently occupied, while 20 apartments (6.4%) were seasonally occupied and 7 apartments (2.2%) were empty. As of 2007, the construction rate of new housing units was 10 new units per 1000 residents. As of 2000 the average price to rent a two-room apartment was about 857.00 CHF (US$690, £390, €550), a three-room apartment was about 1093.00 CHF (US$870, £490, €700) and a four-room apartment cost an average of 1148.00 CHF (US$920, £520, €730). The vacancy rate for the municipality, in 2008, was 0%.

The historical population is given in the following chart:

== Politics ==
In the 2007 federal election the most popular party was the SVP which received 25.22% of the vote. The next three most popular parties were the CVP (24.72%), the SP (18.51%) and the Green Party (16.05%). In the federal election, a total of 269 votes were cast, and the voter turnout was 51.2%.

== Economy ==
As of 2007, Dittingen had an unemployment rate of 1.14%. As of 2005, there were 34 people employed in the primary economic sector and about 12 businesses involved in this sector. 28 people were employed in the secondary sector and there were 8 businesses in this sector. 155 people were employed in the tertiary sector, with 24 businesses in this sector. There were 363 residents of the municipality who were employed in some capacity, of which females made up 42.1% of the workforce.

In 2008 the total number of full-time equivalent jobs was 166. The number of jobs in the primary sector was 16, of which 13 were in agriculture and 3 were in forestry or lumber production. The number of jobs in the secondary sector was 37, of which 34 or (91.9%) were in manufacturing and 3 (8.1%) were in construction. The number of jobs in the tertiary sector was 113. In the tertiary sector; 68 or 60.2% were in wholesale or retail sales or the repair of motor vehicles, 11 or 9.7% were in the movement and storage of goods, 13 or 11.5% were in a hotel or restaurant, 1 or 0.9% were in the information industry, 11 or 9.7% were technical professionals or scientists, 5 or 4.4% were in education.

In 2000, there were 154 workers who commuted into the municipality and 266 workers who commuted away. The municipality is a net exporter of workers, with about 1.7 workers leaving the municipality for every one entering. About 5.8% of the workforce coming into Dittingen are coming from outside Switzerland. Of the working population, 17.9% used public transportation to get to work, and 52.3% used a private car.

== Religion ==
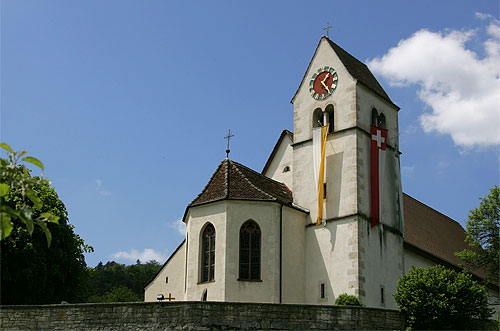
Church in Dittingen

From the 2000 census, 527 or 76.8% were Roman Catholic, while 73 or 10.6% belonged to the Swiss Reformed Church. Of the rest of the population, there were 5 members of an Orthodox church (or about 0.73% of the population), there were 2 individuals (or about 0.29% of the population) who belonged to the Christian Catholic Church, and there were 4 individuals (or about 0.58% of the population) who belonged to another Christian church. There were 12 (or about 1.75% of the population) who were Islamic. There was 1 individual who were Buddhist and 1 individual who belonged to another church. 54 (or about 7.87% of the population) belonged to no church, are agnostic or atheist, and 7 individuals (or about 1.02% of the population) did not answer the question.

== Education ==
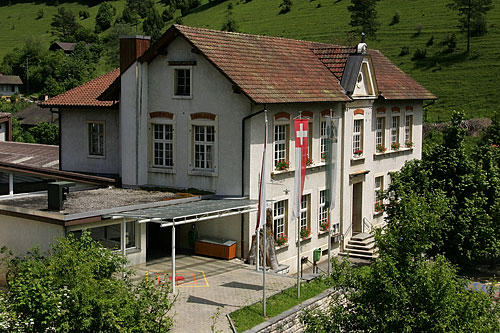
School house in Dittingen

In Dittingen about 305 or (44.5%) of the population have completed non-mandatory upper secondary education, and 65 or (9.5%) have completed additional higher education (either university or a Fachhochschule). Of the 65 who completed tertiary schooling, 75.4% were Swiss men, 20.0% were Swiss women. As of 2000, there was 1 student in Dittingen who came from another municipality, while 43 residents attended schools outside the municipality.
