= Liesberg =

- Municipality
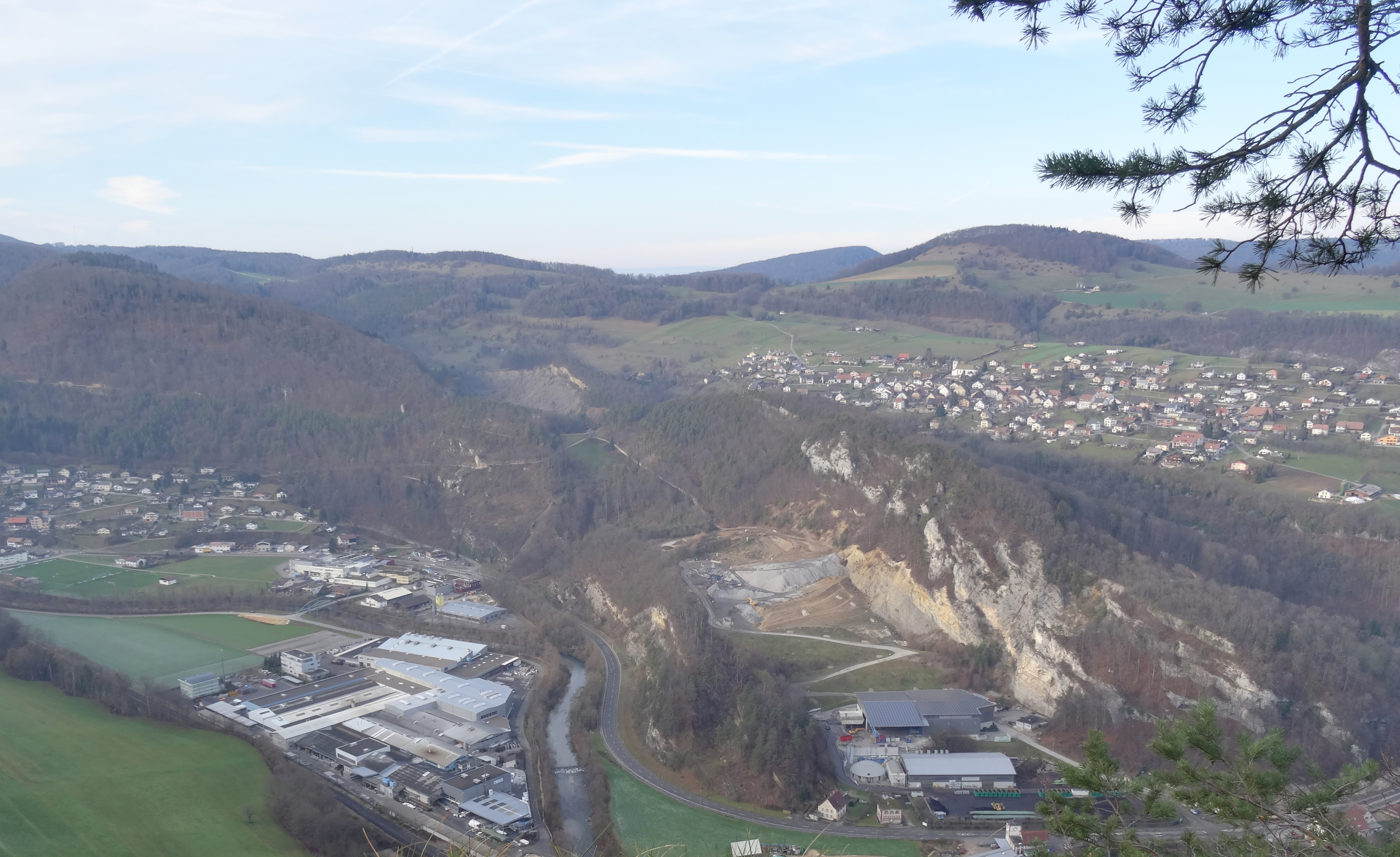

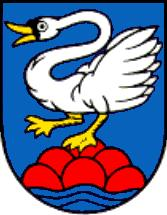
- Coat of arms
- Location of Liesberg
- Location within Switzerland Location within Canton of Basel-Landschaft
- Coordinates: 47°24′N 7°25′E
- Country: Switzerland
- Canton: Basel-Landschaft
- District: Laufen

Area
  - Total: 12.49 km^{2} (4.82 sq mi)
- Elevation: 521 m (1,709 ft)

Population (June 2021)
  - Total: 1,111
  - Density: 88.95/km^{2} (230.4/sq mi)
- Time zone: UTC+01:00 (CET)
  - Summer (DST): UTC+02:00 (CEST)
- Postal code: 4253
- SFOS number: 2788
- ISO 3166 code: CH-BL
- Surrounded by: Bärschwil (SO), Courroux (JU), Kleinlützel (SO), Laufen, Roggenburg, Röschenz, Soyhières (JU)
- Website: liesberg.ch

Liesberg is a municipality in the district of Laufen in the canton of Basel-Country in Switzerland.

== History ==
Liesberg is first mentioned in 1281 as Liesperch.

== Geography ==
Liesberg has an area, as of 2009, of 12.49 square kilometers (4.82 sq mi). Of this area, 4.57 km^{2} (1.76 sq mi) or 36.6% is used for agricultural purposes, while 6.66 km^{2} (2.57 sq mi) or 53.3% is forested. Of the rest of the land, 1.1 km^{2} (0.42 sq mi) or 8.8% is settled (buildings or roads), 0.06 km^{2} (15 acres) or 0.5% is either rivers or lakes and 0.12 km^{2} (30 acres) or 1.0% is unproductive land.

Of the built up area, industrial buildings made up 1.4% of the total area while housing and buildings made up 2.9% and transportation infrastructure made up 3.0%. Power and water infrastructure as well as other special developed areas made up 1.3% of the area Out of the forested land, 49.9% of the total land area is heavily forested and 3.4% is covered with orchards or small clusters of trees. Of the agricultural land, 8.6% is used for growing crops and 19.9% is pastures and 7.2% is used for alpine pastures. All the water in the municipality is flowing water.

The municipality is located in the Laufen district, along the Blauen mountains. It consists of the haufendorf village (an irregular, unplanned and quite closely packed village, built around a central square) of Liesberg and the hamlets of Riederwald and Oberrüti and the industrial development of Liesberg-Station.

== Coat of arms ==
The blazon of the municipal coat of arms is Azure, a Swan passant on Coupeaux of Six Gules issuant from two Fillets wavy Sable.

== Demographics ==
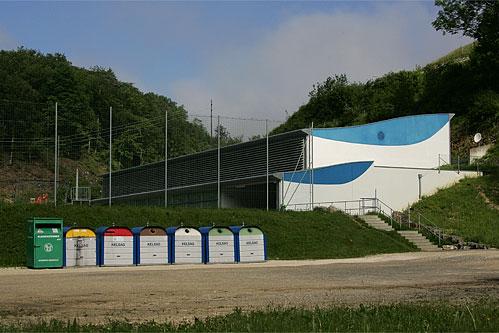
Sports center of Liesberg

Liesberg has a population (as of June 2021) of 1,111. As of 2008, 9.3% of the population are resident foreign nationals. Over the last 10 years (1997–2007) the population has changed at a rate of 0.9%.

Most of the population (as of 2000) speaks German (1,069 or 93.0%), with Serbo-Croatian being second most common (18 or 1.6%) and French being third (17 or 1.5%).

As of 2008, the gender distribution of the population was 52.2% male and 47.8% female. The population was made up of 1,085 Swiss citizens (89.4% of the population), and 129 non-Swiss residents (10.6%) Of the population in the municipality 572 or about 49.8% were born in Liesberg and lived there in 2000. There were 134 or 11.7% who were born in the same canton, while 306 or 26.6% were born somewhere else in Switzerland, and 97 or 8.4% were born outside of Switzerland.

In 2008 there were six live births to Swiss citizens and 3 births to non-Swiss citizens, and in same time span there were 13 deaths of Swiss citizens. Ignoring immigration and emigration, the population of Swiss citizens decreased by seven while the foreign population increased by three. There were two Swiss men who immigrated back to Switzerland. At the same time, there were two non-Swiss men and one non-Swiss woman who immigrated from another country to Switzerland. The total Swiss population change in 2008 (from all sources, including moves across municipal borders) was a decrease of 10 and the non-Swiss population change was an increase of 11 people. This represents a population growth rate of 0.1%.

The age distribution, as of 2010, in Liesberg is; 67 children or 5.5% of the population are between 0 and 6 years old and 185 teenagers or 15.2% are between 7 and 19. Of the adult population, 134 people or 11.0% of the population are between 20 and 29 years old. 124 people or 10.2% are between 30 and 39, 228 people or 18.8% are between 40 and 49, and 269 people or 22.2% are between 50 and 64. The senior population distribution is 152 people or 12.5% of the population are between 65 and 79 years old and there are 55 people or 4.5% who are over 80.

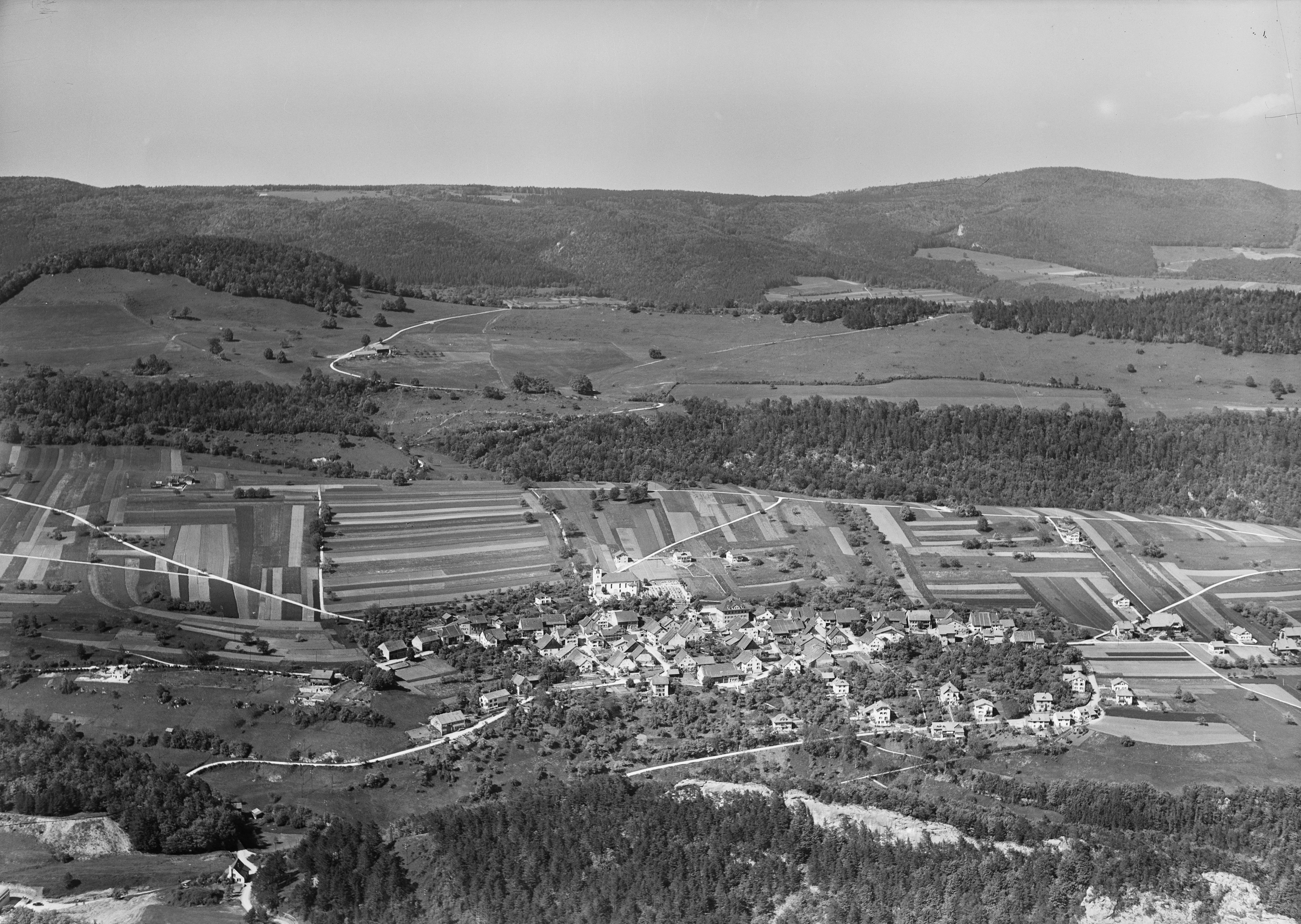
Aerial photo of Liesberg in 1953

As of 2000, there were 474 people who were single and never married in the municipality. There were 557 married individuals, 76 widows or widowers and 42 individuals who are divorced.

As of 2000, there were 455 private households in the municipality, and an average of 2.5 persons per household. There were 123 households that consist of only one person and 33 households with five or more people. Out of a total of 462 households that answered this question, 26.6% were households made up of just one person and 10 were adults who lived with their parents. Of the rest of the households, there are 134 married couples without children, 155 married couples with children There were 21 single parents with a child or children. There were 12 households that were made up unrelated people and 7 households that were made some sort of institution or another collective housing.

In 2000 there were 241 single family homes (or 65.7% of the total) out of a total of 367 inhabited buildings. There were 68 multi-family buildings (18.5%), along with 37 multi-purpose buildings that were mostly used for housing (10.1%) and 21 other use buildings (commercial or industrial) that also had some housing (5.7%). Of the single family homes 48 were built before 1919, while 50 were built between 1990 and 2000.

In 2000 there were 504 apartments in the municipality. The most common apartment size was four rooms of which there were 149. There were eight single room apartments and 187 apartments with five or more rooms. Of these apartments, a total of 443 apartments (87.9% of the total) were permanently occupied, while 31 apartments (6.2%) were seasonally occupied and 30 apartments (6.0%) were empty. As of 2007, the construction rate of new housing units was 3.4 new units per 1000 residents. As of 2000 the average price to rent a two-room apartment was about 577.00 CHF (US$460, £260, €370), a three-room apartment was about 813.00 CHF (US$650, £370, €520) and a four-room apartment cost an average of 958.00 CHF (US$770, £430, €610). The vacancy rate for the municipality, in 2008, was 0.37%.

The historical population is given in the following chart:

== Sights ==
The entire Liesbergmüli area is designated as part of the Inventory of Swiss Heritage Sites.

== Politics ==
In the 2007 federal election the most popular party was the CVP which received 41.15% of the vote. The next three most popular parties were the SVP (26.17%), the FDP (15.64%) and the SP (7.96%). In the federal election, a total of 482 votes were cast, and the voter turnout was 53.5%.

== Economy ==
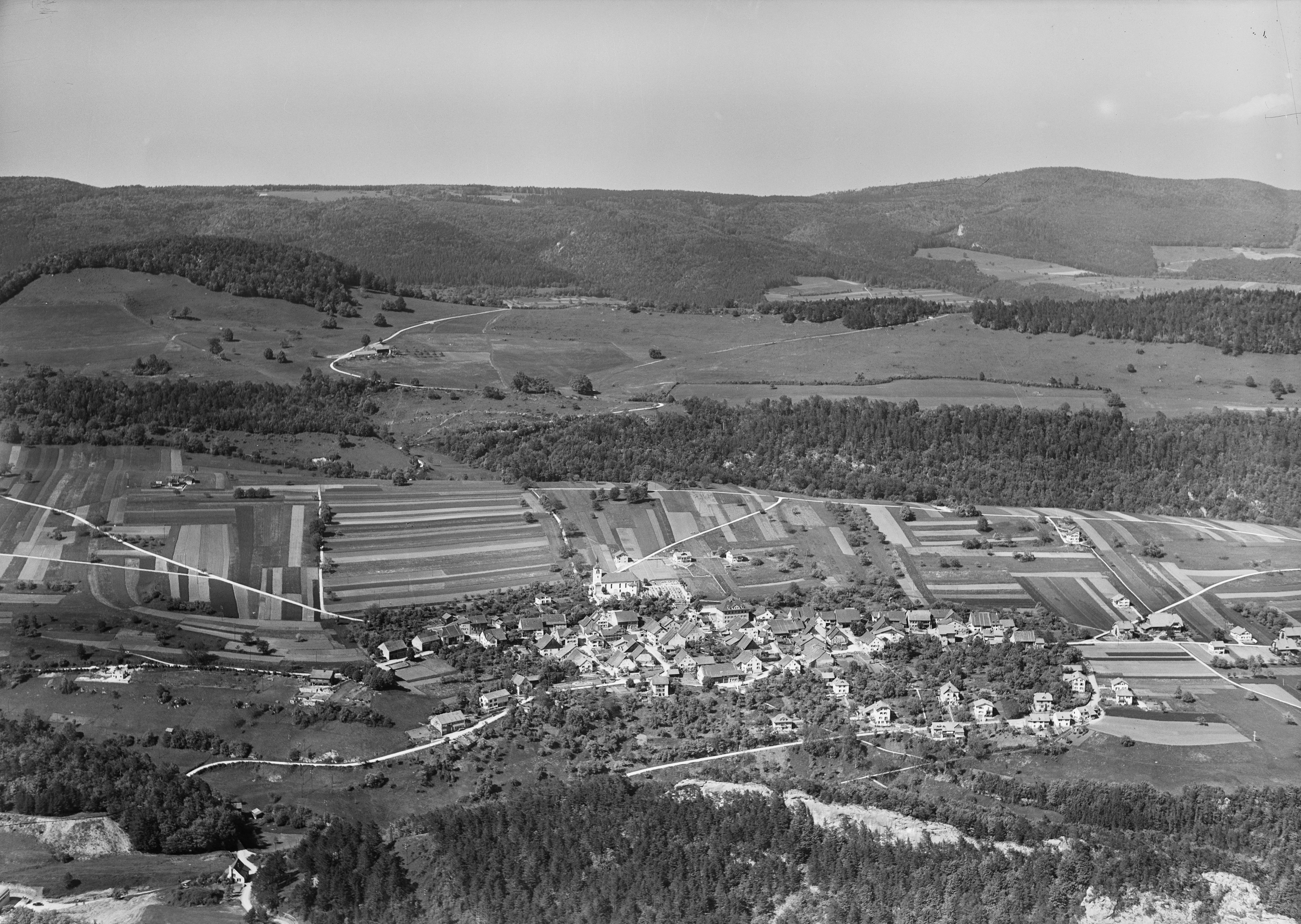
Aerial view of Liesberg, 1953

As of 2007, Liesberg had an unemployment rate of 1.69%. As of 2005, there were 43 people employed in the primary economic sector and about 16 businesses involved in this sector. 505 people were employed in the secondary sector and there were 19 businesses in this sector. 107 people were employed in the tertiary sector, with 36 businesses in this sector. There were 571 residents of the municipality who were employed in some capacity, of which females made up 38.9% of the workforce.

In 2008 the total number of full-time equivalent jobs was 708. The number of jobs in the primary sector was 32, of which 27 were in agriculture and 5 were in forestry or lumber production. The number of jobs in the secondary sector was 571, of which 530 or (92.8%) were in manufacturing, 6 or (1.1%) were in mining and 31 (5.4%) were in construction. The number of jobs in the tertiary sector was 105. In the tertiary sector; 18 or 17.1% were in wholesale or retail sales or the repair of motor vehicles, eight or 7.6% were in the movement and storage of goods, four or 3.8% were in a hotel or restaurant, seven or 6.7% were technical professionals or scientists, six or 5.7% were in education and 23 or 21.9% were in health care.

In 2000, there were 565 workers who commuted into the municipality and 357 workers who commuted away. The municipality is a net importer of workers, with about 1.6 workers entering the municipality for every one leaving. About 23.2% of the workforce coming into Liesberg are coming from outside Switzerland. Of the working population, 20.5% used public transportation to get to work, and 43.1% used a private car.

== Religion ==
From the 2000 census, 854 or 74.3% were Roman Catholic, while 131 or 11.4% belonged to the Swiss Reformed Church. Of the rest of the population, there were 26 members of an Orthodox church (or about 2.26% of the population), there were 3 individuals (or about 0.26% of the population) who belonged to the Christian Catholic Church, and there were 11 individuals (or about 0.96% of the population) who belonged to another Christian church. There were 16 (or about 1.39% of the population) who were Islamic. There were four individuals who were Hindu. 83 (or about 7.22% of the population) belonged to no church, are agnostic or atheist, and 21 individuals (or about 1.83% of the population) did not answer the question.

== Education ==
In Liesberg about 416 or (36.2%) of the population have completed non-mandatory upper secondary education, and 85 or (7.4%) have completed additional higher education (either university or a Fachhochschule). Of the 85 who completed tertiary schooling, 78.8% were Swiss men, 17.6% were Swiss women. As of 2000, there were four students in Liesberg who came from another municipality, while 60 residents attended schools outside the municipality.
