= Laufen District =

Coordinates: 47°25′N 7°30′E

Laufen District Bezirk Laufen
- District
- Country: Switzerland
- Canton: Basel-Landschaft
- Capital: Laufen

Area
  - Total: 89.55 km^{2} (34.58 sq mi)

Population (2021)
  - Total: 20,524
  - Density: 229.2/km^{2} (593.6/sq mi)
- Time zone: UTC+1 (CET)
  - Summer (DST): UTC+2 (CEST)
- Municipalities: 13

Laufen District or Laufental District (French: District de Laufon) is one of the five districts of the largely German-speaking canton of Basel-Country, Switzerland. Its capital is the town of Laufen.

Prior to 1994, it was a district of the canton of Bern, one of the seven historical districts of the Bernese Jura. In 1979, three neighbouring French-speaking districts of Bern seceded to form the new canton of Jura. Laufen was left as an exclave of Bern, wedged between Jura, Solothurn, Basel-Country, and France. In 1989, the populace voted to secede from Bern and join Basel-Country. After a transitional period of preparation, this was effected in 1994.

It had a population of 20,524 (as of 30 June 2021).

== Geography ==
Laufen district has an area, as of 2009, of 89.56 square kilometers (34.58 sq mi). Of this area, 32.47 km^{2} (12.54 sq mi) or 36.3% is used for agricultural purposes, while 46.75 km^{2} (18.05 sq mi) or 52.2% is forested. Of the rest of the land, 9.43 km^{2} (3.64 sq mi) or 10.5% is settled (buildings or roads), 0.62 km^{2} (0.24 sq mi) or 0.7% is either rivers or lakes and 0.25 km^{2} (0.097 sq mi) or 0.3% is unproductive land.

Of the built up area, industrial buildings made up 1.2% of the total area while housing and buildings made up 4.9% and transportation infrastructure made up 3.2%. Out of the forested land, 49.8% of the total land area is heavily forested and 2.4% is covered with orchards or small clusters of trees. Of the agricultural land, 17.1% is used for growing crops and 14.9% is pastures, while 1.6% is used for orchards or vine crops and 2.6% is used for alpine pastures. All the water in the municipality is flowing water.

== Municipalities ==
Laufen contains a total of thirteen municipalities:

Municipality	Population (30 June 2021)	Area, km^{2}
Blauen	705	7.13
Brislach	1,722	9.39
Burg im Leimental	281	2.83
Dittingen	738	6.75
Duggingen	1,550	5.86
Grellingen	1,896	3.31
Laufen	5,814	11.37
Liesberg	1,111	12.49
Nenzlingen	457	3.66
Roggenburg	271	6.65
Röschenz	1,887	10.07
Wahlen	1,529	5.42
Zwingen	2,563	4.62
Total	20,524	89.55

== Demographics ==
Laufen district has a population (as of June 2021) of 20,524. As of 2008, 14.9% of the population are resident foreign nationals.

Most of the population (as of 2000) speaks German (15,363 or 89.4%), with Italian language being second most common (513 or 3.0%) and Albanian being third (261 or 1.5%). There are 235 people who speak French and 10 people who speak Romansh.

As of 2008, the gender distribution of the population was 50.4% male and 49.6% female. The population was made up of 15,891 Swiss citizens (83.9% of the population), and 3,044 non-Swiss residents (16.1%) Of the population in the municipality 5,928 or about 34.5% were born in the Laufen district and lived there in 2000. There were 3,214 or 18.7% who were born in the same canton, while 4,923 or 28.7% were born somewhere else in Switzerland, and 2,544 or 14.8% were born outside of Switzerland.

In 2008 there were 142 live births to Swiss citizens and 27 births to non-Swiss citizens, and in same time span there were 127 deaths of Swiss citizens and 6 non-Swiss citizen deaths. Ignoring immigration and emigration, the population of Swiss citizens increased by 15 while the foreign population increased by 21. There were 15 Swiss men and 10 Swiss women who emigrated from Switzerland. At the same time, there were 58 non-Swiss men and 48 non-Swiss women who immigrated from another country to Switzerland. The total Swiss population change in 2008 (from all sources, including moves across municipal borders) was an increase of 67 and the non-Swiss population change was an increase of 77 people. This represents a population growth rate of 0.8%.

The age distribution, as of 2010, in the Laufen district is; 1,227 children or 6.5% of the population are between 0 and 6 years old and 2,882 teenagers or 15.2% are between 7 and 19. Of the adult population, 2,196 people or 11.6% of the population are between 20 and 29 years old. 2,457 people or 13.0% are between 30 and 39, 3,467 people or 18.3% are between 40 and 49, and 3,838 people or 20.3% are between 50 and 64. The senior population distribution is 2,147 people or 11.3% of the population are between 65 and 79 years old and there are 721 people or 3.8% who are over 80.

As of 2000, there were 7,062 people who were single and never married in the municipality. There were 8,472 married individuals, 912 widows or widowers and 736 individuals who are divorced.

There were 1,932 households that consist of only one person and 497 households with five or more people. Out of a total of 7,107 households that answered this question, 27.2% were households made up of just one person and 74 were adults who lived with their parents. Of the rest of the households, there are 2,161 married couples without children, 2,343 married couples with children There were 370 single parents with a child or children. There were 115 households that were made up unrelated people and 112 households that were made some sort of institution or another collective housing.

As of 2000 the average price to rent a two-room apartment was about 829.00 CHF (US$660, £370, €530), a three-room apartment was about 1007.00 CHF (US$810, £450, €640) and a four-room apartment cost an average of 1267.00 CHF (US$1010, £570, €810).

The historical population is given in the following chart:

== Politics ==
In the 2007 federal election the most popular party was the SVP which received 29.42% of the vote. The next three most popular parties were the CVP (22.66%), the FDP (20.09%) and the SP (15.9%). In the federal election, a total of 6,170 votes were cast, and the voter turnout was 48.2%.

== Religion ==
From the 2000 census, 10,857 or 63.2% were Roman Catholic, while 2,629 or 15.3% belonged to the Swiss Reformed Church. Of the rest of the population, there were 140 members of an Orthodox church (or about 0.81% of the population), there were 138 individuals (or about 0.80% of the population) who belonged to the Christian Catholic Church, and there were 308 individuals (or about 1.79% of the population) who belonged to another Christian church. There were 10 individuals (or about 0.06% of the population) who were Jewish, and 660 (or about 3.84% of the population) who were Muslim. There were 32 individuals who were Buddhist, 94 individuals who were Hindu and 16 individuals who belonged to another church. 1,769 (or about 10.30% of the population) belonged to no church, are agnostic or atheist, and 529 individuals (or about 3.08% of the population) did not answer the question.

== Education ==
In the Laufen district about 6,544 or (38.1%) of the population have completed non-mandatory upper secondary education, and 1,705 or (9.9%) have completed additional higher education (either University or a Fachhochschule). Of the 1,705 who completed tertiary schooling, 66.5% were Swiss men, 22.6% were Swiss women, 7.0% were non-Swiss men and 3.9% were non-Swiss women.
