= Zwingen =

- Municipality
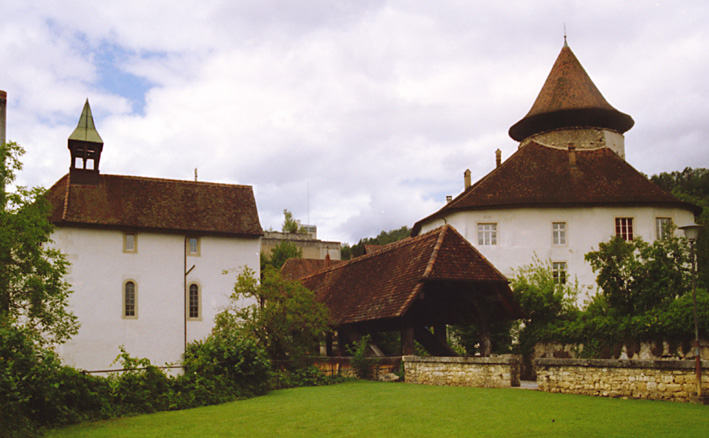

- Coat of arms
- Location of Zwingen
- Location within Switzerland Location within Canton of Basel-Landschaft
- Coordinates: 47°26′N 7°32′E
- Country: Switzerland
- Canton: Basel-Landschaft
- District: Laufen

Area
  - Total: 4.62 km^{2} (1.78 sq mi)
- Elevation: 341 m (1,119 ft)

Population (June 2021)
  - Total: 2,563
  - Density: 555/km^{2} (1,440/sq mi)
- Time zone: UTC+01:00 (CET)
  - Summer (DST): UTC+02:00 (CEST)
- Postal code: 4222
- SFOS number: 2793
- ISO 3166 code: CH-BL
- Surrounded by: Blauen, Brislach, Dittingen, Laufen, Nenzlingen
- Website: zwingen.ch

Zwingen is a municipality in the district of Laufen in the canton of Basel-Country in Switzerland.

== Geography ==
Aerial view from 300 m by Walter Mittelholzer (1922)

Zwingen has an area, as of 2009, of 4.62 square kilometers (1.78 sq mi). Of this area, 1.54 km^{2} (0.59 sq mi) or 33.3% is used for agricultural purposes, while 1.76 km^{2} (0.68 sq mi) or 38.1% is forested. Of the rest of the land, 1.18 km^{2} (0.46 sq mi) or 25.5% is settled (buildings or roads), 0.12 km^{2} (30 acres) or 2.6% is either rivers or lakes and 0.01 km^{2} (2.5 acres) or 0.2% is unproductive land.

Of the built up area, industrial buildings made up 4.8% of the total area while housing and buildings made up 6.9% and transportation infrastructure made up 8.9%. Power and water infrastructure as well as other special developed areas made up 3.0% of the area while parks, green belts and sports fields made up 1.9%. Out of the forested land, 34.6% of the total land area is heavily forested and 3.5% is covered with orchards or small clusters of trees. Of the agricultural land, 19.9% is used for growing crops and 12.8% is pastures. All the water in the municipality is flowing water.

== Coat of arms ==
The blazon of the municipal coat of arms is Sable, two Battons fleury Argent in saltire.

== Demographics ==
Zwingen has a population (as of June 2021) of 2,563. As of 2008, 15.6% of the population are resident foreign nationals. Over the last 10 years (1997–2007) the population has changed at a rate of 9.3%.

Most of the population (as of 2000) speaks German (1,781 or 88.3%), with Italian language being second most common (43 or 2.1%) and Turkish being third (40 or 2.0%). There are 39 people who speak French and 1 person who speaks Romansh.

As of 2008, the gender distribution of the population was 50.6% male and 49.4% female. The population was made up of 1,779 Swiss citizens (83.1% of the population), and 361 non-Swiss residents (16.9%) Of the population in the municipality 595 or about 29.5% were born in Zwingen and lived there in 2000. There were 427 or 21.2% who were born in the same canton, while 590 or 29.3% were born somewhere else in Switzerland, and 331 or 16.4% were born outside of Switzerland.

In 2008 there were 14 live births to Swiss citizens and 2 births to non-Swiss citizens, and in same time span there were 13 deaths of Swiss citizens. Ignoring immigration and emigration, the population of Swiss citizens increased by 1 while the foreign population increased by 2. There were 3 Swiss men who emigrated from Switzerland. At the same time, there were 4 non-Swiss men and 3 non-Swiss women who immigrated from another country to Switzerland. The total Swiss population change in 2008 (from all sources, including moves across municipal borders) was an increase of 15 and the non-Swiss population change was an increase of 1 people. This represents a population growth rate of 0.8%.

The age distribution, as of 2010, in Zwingen is; 129 children or 6.0% of the population are between 0 and 6 years old and 347 teenagers or 16.2% are between 7 and 19. Of the adult population, 277 people or 12.9% of the population are between 20 and 29 years old. 287 people or 13.4% are between 30 and 39, 423 people or 19.8% are between 40 and 49, and 406 people or 19.0% are between 50 and 64. The senior population distribution is 205 people or 9.6% of the population are between 65 and 79 years old and there are 66 people or 3.1% who are over 80.

As of 2000, there were 842 people who were single and never married in the municipality. There were 998 married individuals, 79 widows or widowers and 98 individuals who are divorced.

As of 2000, there were 826 private households in the municipality, and an average of 2.4 persons per household. There were 223 households that consist of only one person and 60 households with five or more people. Out of a total of 840 households that answered this question, 26.5% were households made up of just one person and 10 were adults who lived with their parents. Of the rest of the households, there are 274 married couples without children, 266 married couples with children There were 42 single parents with a child or children. There were 11 households that were made up unrelated people and 14 households that were made some sort of institution or another collective housing.

In 2000 there were 279 single family homes (or 61.7% of the total) out of a total of 452 inhabited buildings. There were 100 multi-family buildings (22.1%), along with 45 multi-purpose buildings that were mostly used for housing (10.0%) and 28 other use buildings (commercial or industrial) that also had some housing (6.2%). Of the single family homes 16 were built before 1919, while 85 were built between 1990 and 2000. The greatest number of single family homes (46) were built between 1991 and 1995.

In 2000 there were 892 apartments in the municipality. The most common apartment size was 4 rooms of which there were 306. There were 18 single room apartments and 237 apartments with five or more rooms. Of these apartments, a total of 809 apartments (90.7% of the total) were permanently occupied, while 49 apartments (5.5%) were seasonally occupied and 34 apartments (3.8%) were empty. As of 2007, the construction rate of new housing units was 0.9 new units per 1000 residents. As of 2000 the average price to rent a two-room apartment was about 992.00 CHF (US$790, £450, €630), a three-room apartment was about 1121.00 CHF (US$900, £500, €720) and a four-room apartment cost an average of 1285.00 CHF (US$1030, £580, €820). The vacancy rate for the municipality, in 2008, was 1.33%.

The historical population is given in the following chart:

== Sights ==
The entire village of Zwingen is designated as part of the Inventory of Swiss Heritage Sites.

== Politics ==
In the 2007 federal election the most popular party was the SVP which received 32.17% of the vote. The next three most popular parties were the SP (20.7%), the CVP (18.19%) and the FDP (15.06%). In the federal election, a total of 561 votes were cast, and the voter turnout was 40.2%.

== Economy ==
As of 2007, Zwingen had an unemployment rate of 2.44%. As of 2005, there were 28 people employed in the primary economic sector and about 8 businesses involved in this sector. 365 people were employed in the secondary sector and there were 37 businesses in this sector. 482 people were employed in the tertiary sector, with 94 businesses in this sector. There were 1,098 residents of the municipality who were employed in some capacity, of which females made up 40.8% of the workforce.

In 2008 the total number of full-time equivalent jobs was 705. The number of jobs in the primary sector was 10, all of which were in agriculture. The number of jobs in the secondary sector was 340, of which 201 or (59.1%) were in manufacturing and 133 (39.1%) were in construction. The number of jobs in the tertiary sector was 355. In the tertiary sector; 198 or 55.8% were in wholesale or retail sales or the repair of motor vehicles, 34 or 9.6% were in the movement and storage of goods, 10 or 2.8% were in a hotel or restaurant, 5 or 1.4% were in the information industry, 5 or 1.4% were the insurance or financial industry, 40 or 11.3% were technical professionals or scientists, 23 or 6.5% were in education and 2 or 0.6% were in health care.

In 2000, there were 766 workers who commuted into the municipality and 838 workers who commuted away. The municipality is a net exporter of workers, with about 1.1 workers leaving the municipality for every one entering. About 12.7% of the workforce coming into Zwingen are coming from outside Switzerland. Of the working population, 18.9% used public transportation to get to work, and 51.7% used a private car.

== Religion ==
From the 2000 census, 1,161 or 57.6% were Roman Catholic, while 301 or 14.9% belonged to the Swiss Reformed Church. Of the rest of the population, there were 28 members of an Orthodox church (or about 1.39% of the population), there were 7 individuals (or about 0.35% of the population) who belonged to the Christian Catholic Church, and there were 46 individuals (or about 2.28% of the population) who belonged to another Christian church. There were 112 (or about 5.55% of the population) who were Islamic. There were 8 individuals who were Buddhist, 10 individuals who were Hindu and 5 individuals who belonged to another church. 264 (or about 13.09% of the population) belonged to no church, are agnostic or atheist, and 75 individuals (or about 3.72% of the population) did not answer the question.

== Transport ==
Zwingen sits on the Basel–Biel/Bienne line and is served by local trains at Zwingen.

== Education ==
In Zwingen about 830 or (41.2%) of the population have completed non-mandatory upper secondary education, and 179 or (8.9%) have completed additional higher education (either university or a Fachhochschule). Of the 179 who completed tertiary schooling, 63.1% were Swiss men, 19.0% were Swiss women, 12.8% were non-Swiss men and 5.0% were non-Swiss women. As of 2000, there were 110 students in Zwingen who came from another municipality, while 70 residents attended schools outside the municipality.
