= Burg Castle (Burg im Leimental) =

Castle in Burg im Leimental, Switzerland

Burg im Leimental Castle
- Burg
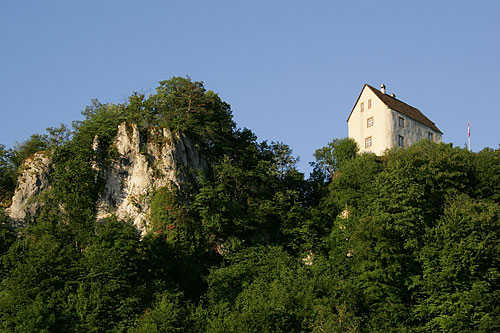
- Burg im Leimental Castle

Site information
- Type: hill castle
- Code: CH-BL
- Condition: preserved

Location
- Coordinates: 47°27′25″N 7°26′26″E

Site history
- Built: about 1250

Burg Castle (German: Schloss Burg) is a castle in the municipality of Burg im Leimental of the Canton of Basel-Country in Switzerland. It is a Swiss heritage site of national significance.

== See also ==
- List of castles in Switzerland
