= Grellingen railway station =

Railway station in Switzerland

Grellingen
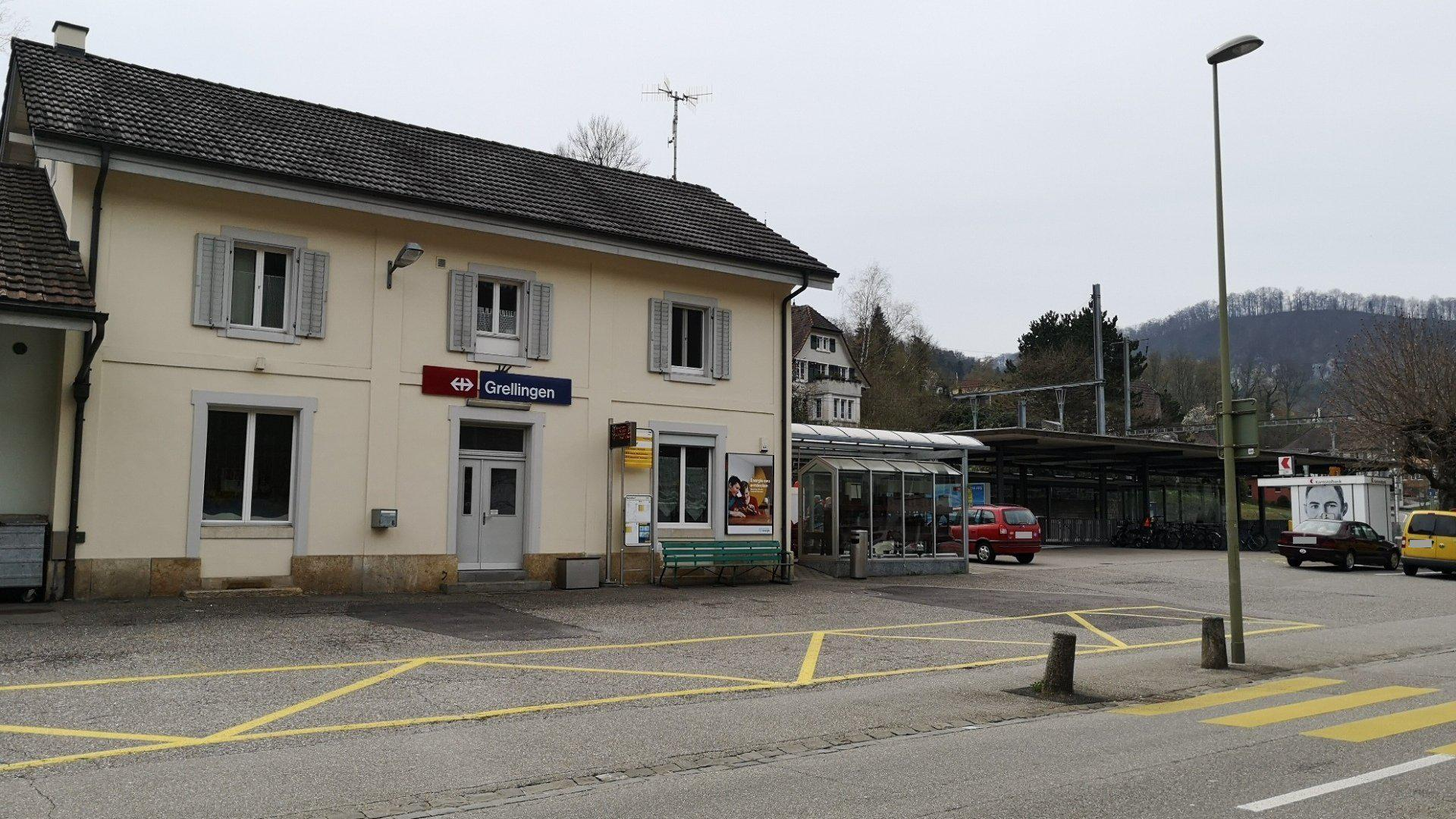
- The station building in 2019

General information
- Location: Grellingen; Switzerland
- Coordinates: 47°26′28.54″N 7°35′32.46″E
- Owner: Swiss Federal Railways
- Line: Basel–Biel/Bienne line
- Train operators: Swiss Federal Railways

Services
| Preceding station | Basel S-Bahn | Following station |
|---|---|---|
| Zwingen towards Delémont | S3 | Duggingen towards Olten |
| Zwingen towards Laufen | S31 | Aesch towards Basel SBB |
Location
- Location within Switzerland

Grellingen railway station (German: Bahnhof Grellingen) is a railway station in the municipality of Grellingen, in the Swiss canton of Basel-Landschaft. It is an intermediate stop on the Basel–Biel/Bienne line and is served by local trains only.

== Services ==
As of the December 2025 timetable change, the following services stop at Grellingen:

- Basel S-Bahn /: half-hourly service between Olten and Laufen with additional peak-hour service to Basel SBB and two trains per day to Delémont.
