= Aesch Castle =

Castle in Aesch, Basel-Country, Switzerland

- Aesch
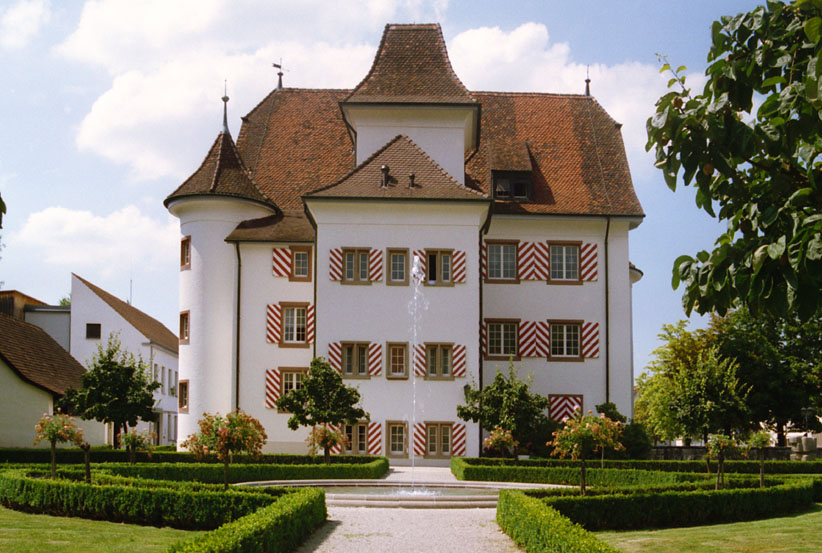
- East side of the castle, with gardens and fountain

Site information
- Code: CH-BL
- Condition: municipal administration building

Location
- Coordinates: 47°27′12″N 07°35′39″E

Site history
- Built: 1606

Aesch Castle or Blarer Castle (German: Schloss Aesch) is a castle in the Swiss municipality of Aesch in the canton of Basel-Country.

== Location ==
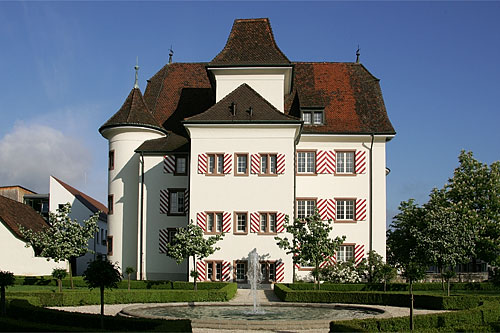
Aesch Castle

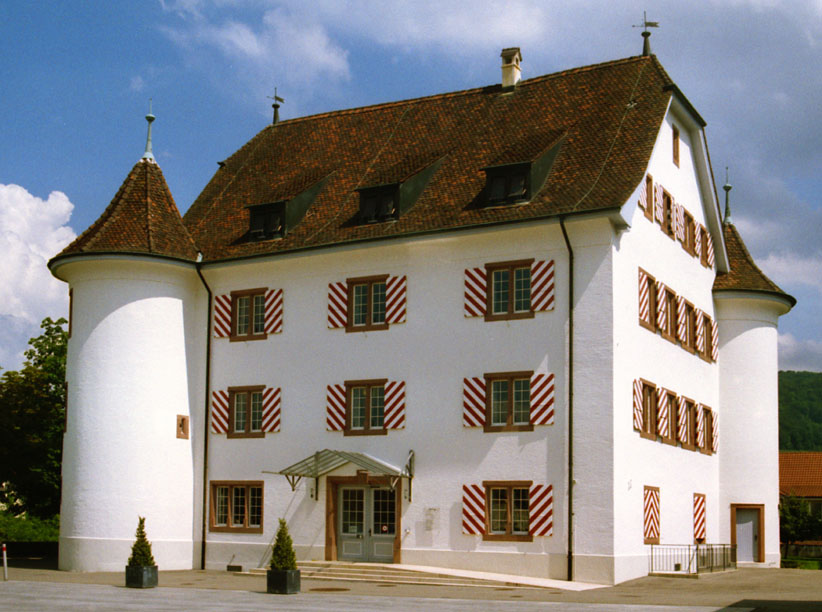
Aesch Castle from the west

Aesch Castle is about 500 meters (1,600 ft) northwest of the gorge and Angenstein Castle and 1,500 meters (4,900 ft) north-northeast of the ruins of Pfeffingen Castle on the edge of the core of Aesch village.

== History ==
The castle was built in 1605/06 by the Blarer of Wartensee family. This family was originally from St. Gallen and had become wealthy from the linen trade. One line of the family settled in Wartensee Castle at Rorschach, hence the name of this line. With the election of Jacob Christoph Blarer of Wartensee in 1575 to the canons of the cathedral of Basel the family gained interests in the Basel region. Jacob Christoph Blarer was also one of the main leaders of the Counter-Reformation in Birseck.

The Blarers began to expand their power in the Basel region when Jacob Christoph Blarer appointed his brother Wolfgang Dietrich Blarer to the upper Vogt of Pfeffingen in 1583. This position gave the family a steady source of income from tithes, taxes and interest. Many other privileges, for example a charter granted by Jacob Christoph Blarer in 1604, led to a steady growth of wealth of the Blarer family. In the years before his death in 1608, he tasked his nephew Wilhelm Blarer, to consolidate the family's position and power by building a castle at Aesch. In 1607, the castle grounds and surrounding property were given to Wilhelm by Jacob Christoph. At the same time, Jacob Christoph as the Bishop of Basel freed Wilhelm from all offerings.

By 1702, the Prince-Bishop allowed the Vogt Johann Konrad Blarer to live in the castle at Aesch rather than in Pfeffingen, but his clerk had to stay in Pfeffingen Castle. As the castle at Pfeffingen lacked the comfort and prestige that the family desired for a family seat, in 1740 the Blarers moved their center of power into Aesch.

During the Thirty Years' War the castle was damaged, but was rebuilt immediately. At the time of the French Revolution a hospital was set up in the castle.

Finally, in 1851 the castle was bought from the family by the municipality of Aesch and rebuilt. Two classrooms and two teachers' houses were added. It was renovated in 1900 by Rudolf Sandreuter, who moved the main entrance to the village side and added gothic revival and an additional half-round tower. Starting in 1909 it was used as a school and community center. Since the renovation of 1958/59, which restored its original condition, the municipal administration has occupied the castle.

== Castle site ==
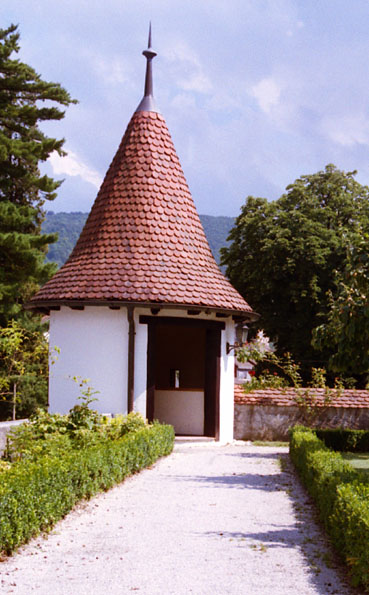
Tower in the castle gardens

Originally, on the site of the castle there was a hostel. The castle was designed from the beginning as a representative, multi-story mansion. Therefore, little value was placed on the defensive capability of the structure. The nearby Pfeffingen Castle provided the family with a defensive fortress, and the power of gunpowder weapons at the time meant that castles were no longer effective as fortresses.

The main building has a basement with a vaulted cellar. On the north and west of the palace buildings there were several support buildings including a wine-press and stables, some of which are still in existence today. The builder is not known with certainty, but it could be, according to surviving receipts, be Michael Brauwn or Braun.

Baroque extensions to the castle took place in 1730 and 1740 and at this time the French garden was added. The wall around the whole complex was decorated with several turrets and bartizans while lattice doors ensured accessibility to the grounds.

Most of the current castle exterior dates back to the state after the great expansion in the 18th century. However, the perimeter wall has been significantly adjusted and some portions have been totally demolished. Due to the many different functions that the castle has served, the interiors have been changed significantly.

The park is easily accessible to the public and the castle can be visited whenever the local government offices are open. The vaulted cellar is now expanded and used for special events and can be rented from the local authority. In the west, a former outbuilding now houses the local museum of Aesch.
