= Aesch railway station =

Railway station in Switzerland

Aesch
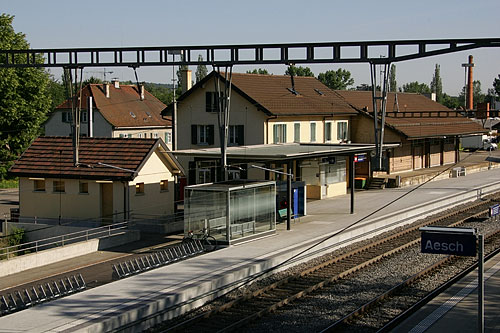
- The station building in 2006

General information
- Location: Bahnhofstrasse; Aesch; Switzerland
- Coordinates: 47°28′3.61″N 7°36′12.24″E
- Owner: Swiss Federal Railways
- Line: Basel–Biel/Bienne line
- Train operators: Swiss Federal Railways

Services
Preceding station	Basel S-Bahn	Following station
Duggingen towards Delémont	S3	Dornach-Arlesheim towards Olten
Grellingen towards Laufen	S31	Dornach-Arlesheim towards Basel SBB
Location
- Location within Switzerland

Aesch railway station (German: Bahnhof Aesch) is a railway station in the municipality of Aesch, in the Swiss canton of Basel-Landschaft. It is an intermediate stop on the Basel–Biel/Bienne line and is served by local trains only. The station is on the east side of the river Birs, opposite the Aesch city center.

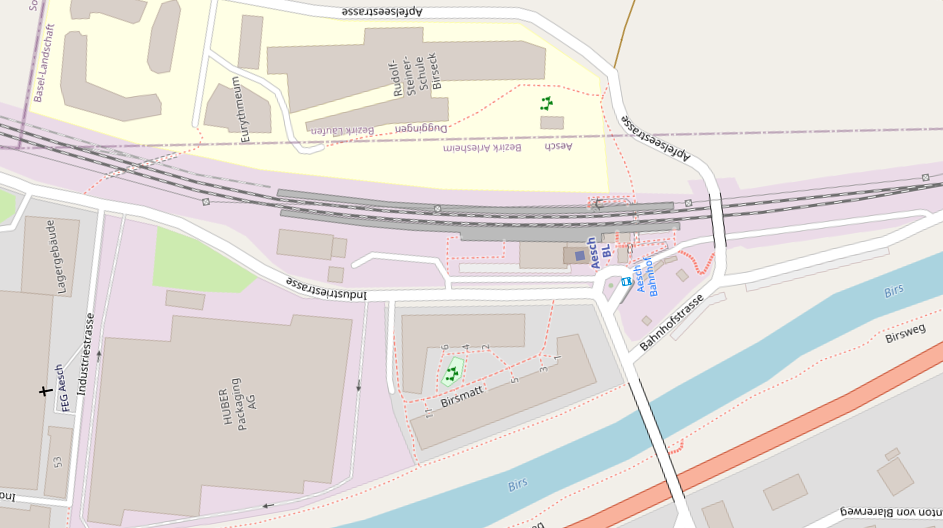
Map of the station

== Services ==
As of the December 2025 timetable change, the following services stop at Aesch:

- Basel S-Bahn /: half-hourly service between Olten and Laufen with additional peak-hour service to Basel SBB and two trains per day to Delémont.

== Gallery ==
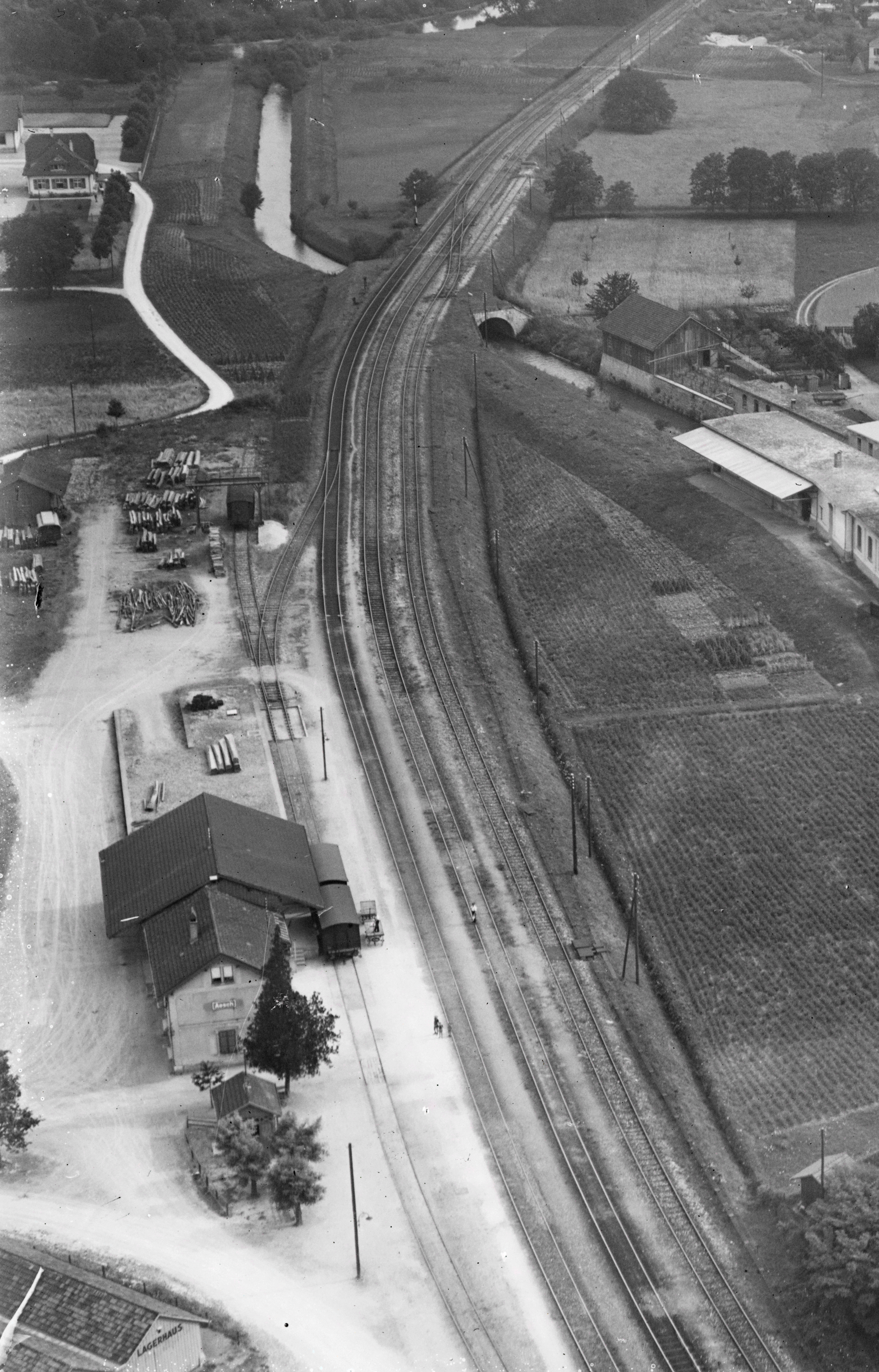
aerial view (between 1918 and 1937)

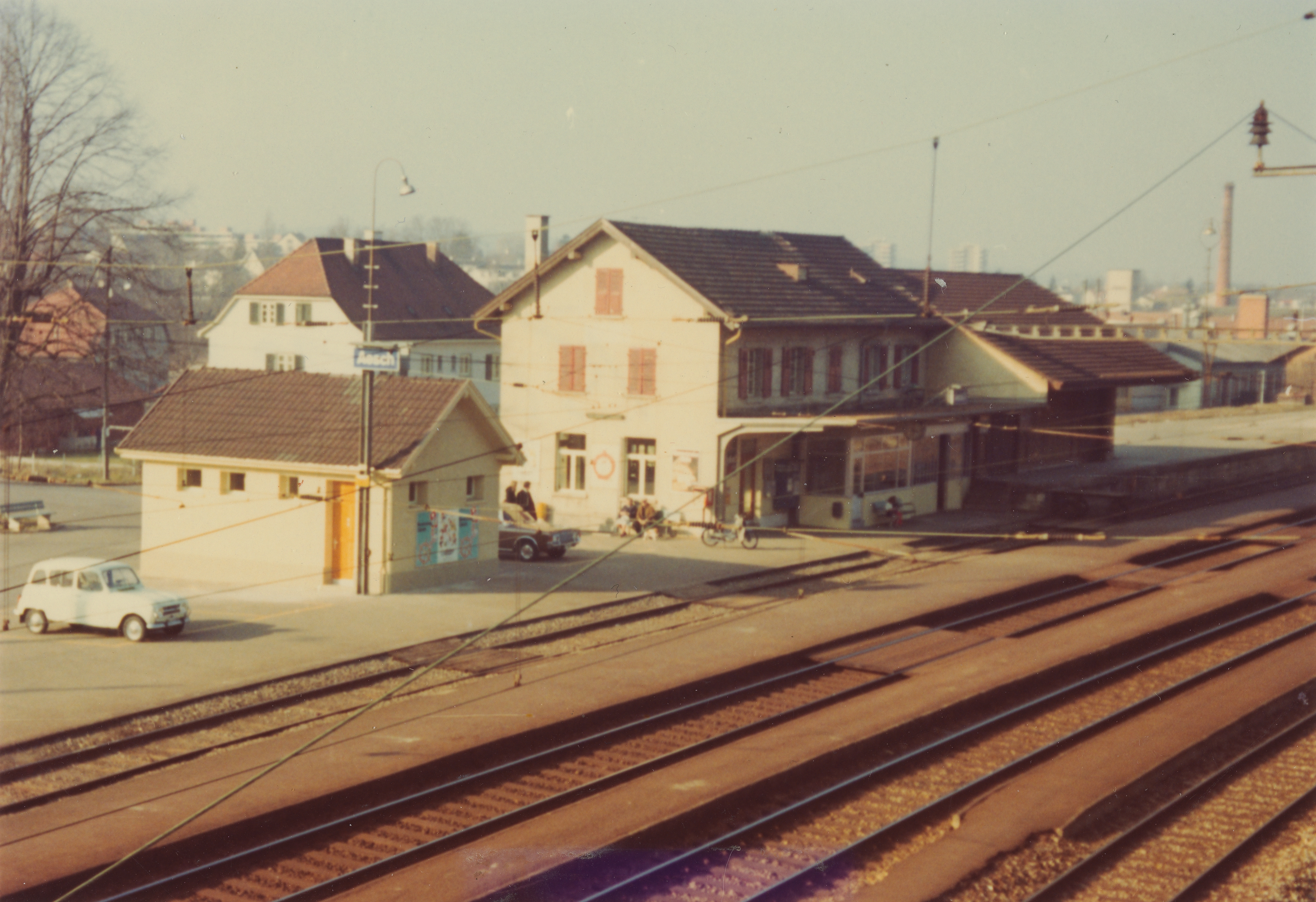
station in 1976 with 4 tracks
