= Duggingen railway station =

Railway station in Switzerland

Duggingen
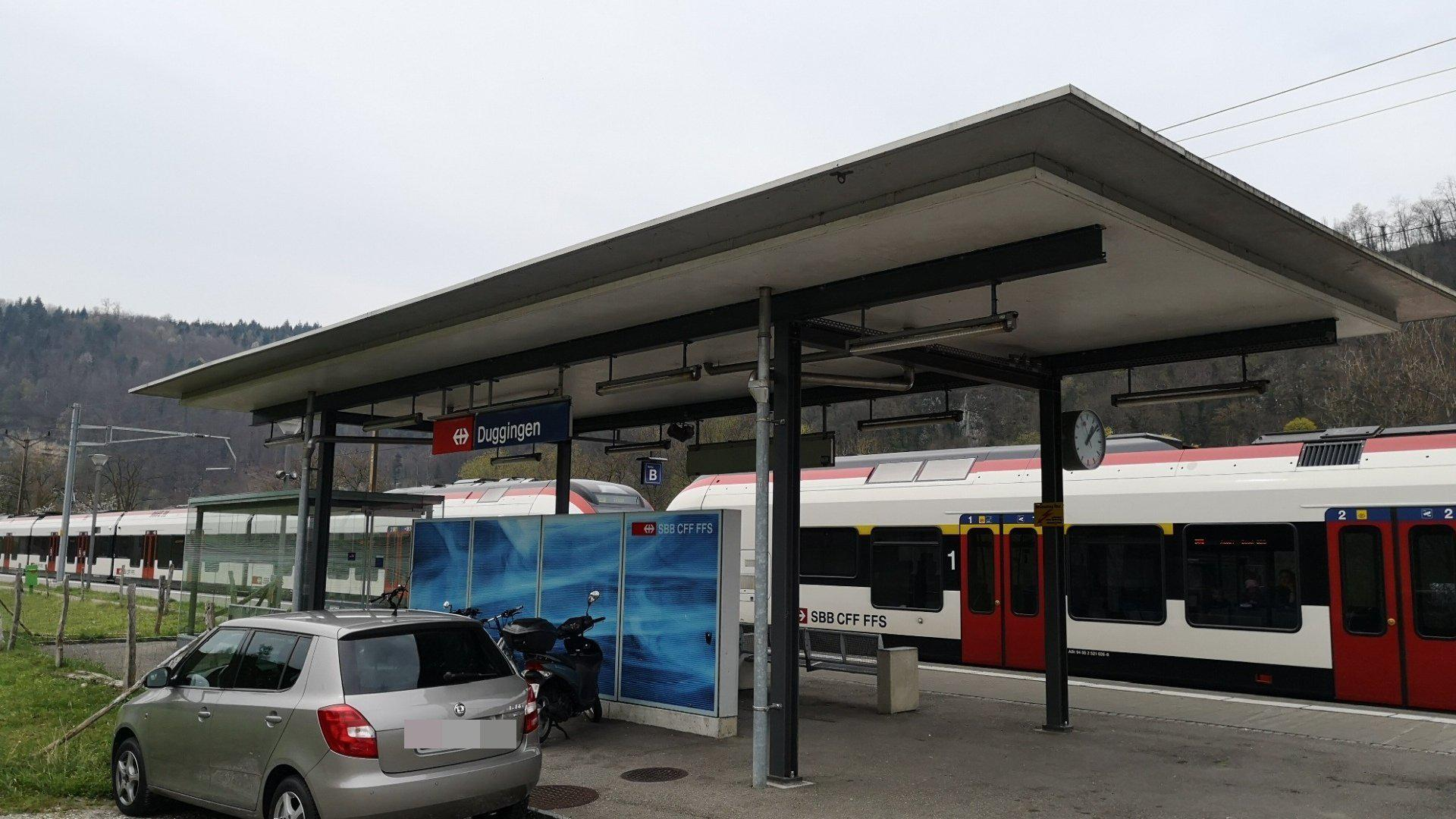
- A Basel S-Bahn train at Duggingen in 2019

General information
- Location: Duggingen; Switzerland
- Coordinates: 47°27′12.35″N 7°36′12.36″E
- Owner: Swiss Federal Railways
- Line: Basel–Biel/Bienne line
- Train operators: Swiss Federal Railways

Services
Preceding station	Basel S-Bahn	Following station
Grellingen towards Delémont	S3	Aesch towards Olten
Location
- Location within Switzerland

Duggingen railway station (German: Bahnhof Duggingen) is a railway station in the municipality of Duggingen, in the Swiss canton of Basel-Landschaft. It is an intermediate stop on the Basel–Biel/Bienne line and is served by local trains only.

== Services ==
As of the December 2025 timetable change, the following services stop at Duggingen:

- Basel S-Bahn: half-hourly service between Olten and Laufen and two trains per day to Delémont.
