= Frohberg Castle =

Castel in Aesch, Basel-Landschaft, Switzerland

- Tschäpperli, Tschöpperli
- Aesch
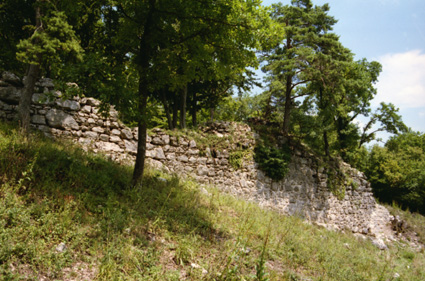
- Ruins of the south wall

Site information
- Type: hill castle
- Code: CH-BL
- Condition: ruin

Location
- Coordinates: 47°28′4.25″N 07°33′43.1″E

Site history
- Built: Second half of the 13th century

Frohberg Castle (German: Ruine Frohberg, Tschäpperli or Tschöpperli) is a medieval castle ruin in the Swiss municipality of Aesch in the canton of canton of Basel-Land.

== Location ==
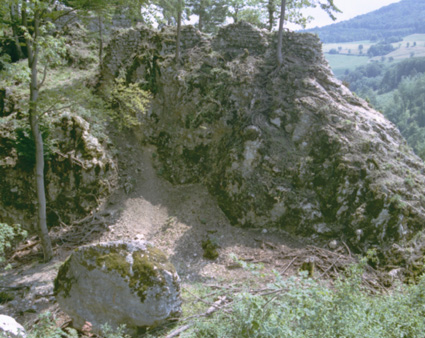
Entrance to Frohberg Castle

The ruin is on a rocky ridge at the upper end of the Klus valley on the way to the old Platten pass road. It lies near the ruins of Schalberg Castle, the ruins of Engenstein Castle and the ruins of Münchberg Castle. It is the rearmost castle in the Aesch controlled Klus valley and is one of the castles built on the ridge above Aesch.

== History ==
The stronghold at Frohberg was first mentioned in 1292 when Conrad I Schaler "de Vroberg" was mentioned. It is likely that the castle was built by the Schaler family in the second half of the 13th century. Although the castle dominated the way across the Platten pass (between Birseck and Laufental), the location of other castles in the immediate vicinity, suggests that the motivation for the castle was not the collection of tolls, but power games between the families of the Schaler and Münch.

Werner Meyer noted that the castle was perhaps never quite finished while Carl Roth believed that the castle was damaged during the Basel earthquake of 1356 and was not repaired. In any case, in the 14th century, the remains were given as a bishop's fief to the counts of Thierstein-Pfeffingen. This fief was not so much about the ruins, which needed costly repairs, but the assets related to the castle including tax collection and court rights. The Thierstein-Pfeffingens integrated the Frohberg lands into the Herrschaft of Pfeffingen, which was managed from the nearby Pfeffingen Castle ruins.

The original name, Vroberg has changed over time in the vernacular into Tschäpperli or Tschöpperli.

== Castle site ==
The ruins are widely scattered and consists of an extended main castle, surrounded by different approach obstacles. So far, the ruins have not yet been investigated archaeologically and so only rough interpretations are possible.

On the west and north side is a deep, natural ditch, on the east side there is an artificial moat, while on the south there are walls and ditches. The latter are heavily disturbed by agricultural plowing on the south and west.

The main castle was formed by a housing tract and a curtain wall. The wall follows the irregularly extending ledge. The massive living area consists of two parts and a smaller west building with irregular floor plan as a residential tower. The thick walls were up to 3 meters (9.8 ft) thick and built from rough cut stone. To the east, adjoining the living area, is an elongated building that served as an administrative and residential building. On the northwest and northeast sides the remains of outlying estates are visible.

The entrance to the castle was on the north-west side of the fortress, either through a ramp over the ditch or over a bridge supported by a natural rocks. It is possible that another entrance might have been on the east side.
