= Petra Sprecher =

Swiss circus artist and stuntwoman

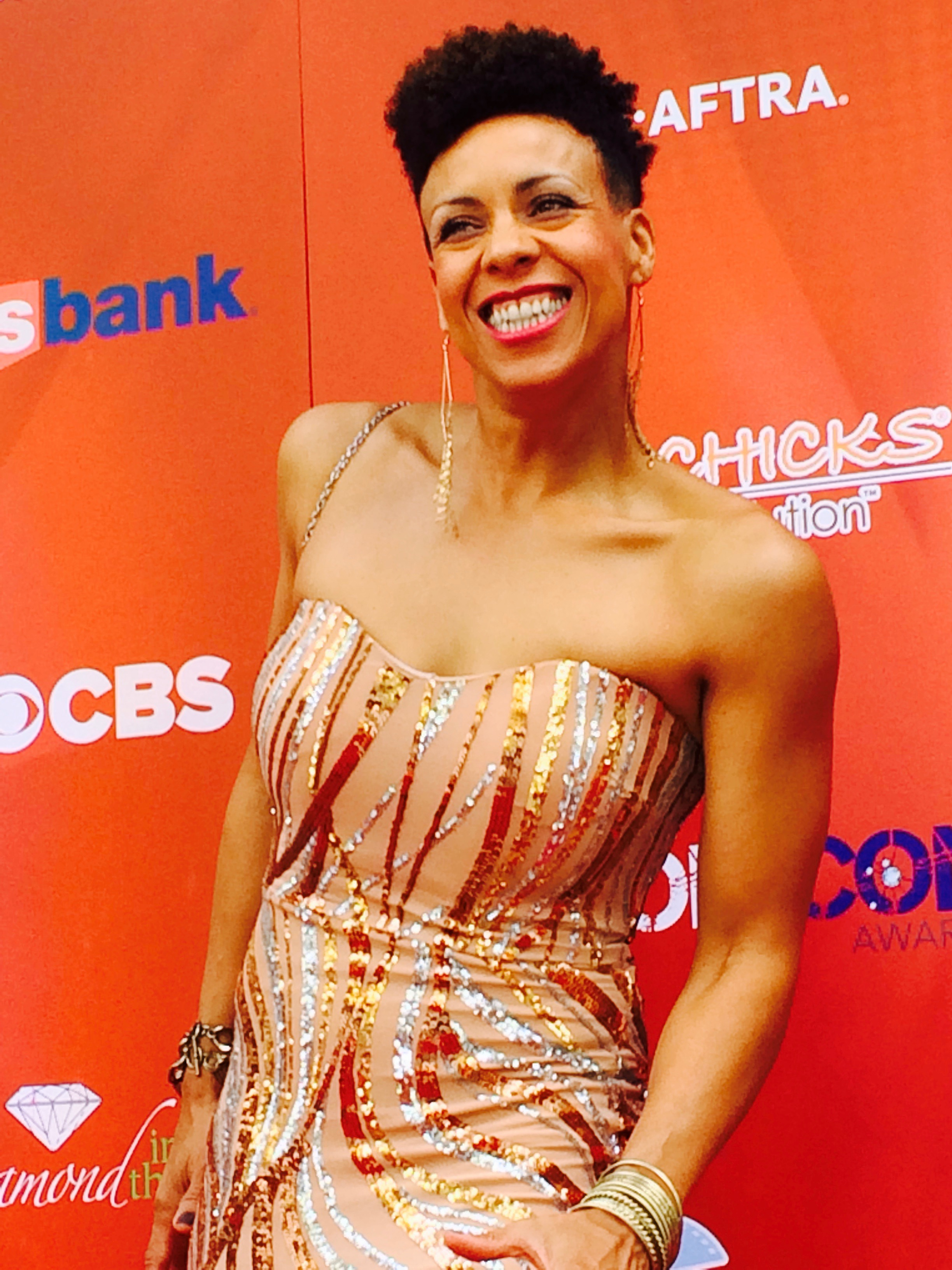
- Sprecher at Action Icon Awards 2015
- Born: Basel, Switzerland
- Occupations: Stuntwoman, actress
- Years active: 2000–present

Petra Sprecher is a Swiss circus artist, stuntwoman and actress residing in Los Angeles. She is best known for being the original cast and the creator of the Cloudswing act in Cirque du Soleil's Quidam.

In the stunt realm she is an established double for African American actresses. Some of her most notable stunt work includes doubling for Mariah Carey in The House, Vivica A. Fox in Independence Day: Resurgence and Rosario Dawson in Eagle Eye, for which she was double-nominated by the Taurus World Stunt Awards for Best High Work and Best Overall Stunt By A Woman. As an actor, she has appeared both on television and in feature films embodying roles, which require special skills.

== Early life ==
Sprecher was born in Basel, Switzerland, to Priska, a Swiss-German schoolteacher, and Peter Osimadu, a Nigerian journalist. She has a step father named Franz Sprecher, a Swiss banker and she has two younger half brothers named Felix, an igloo builder and Benno, an engineer, who are still living in Basel. She grew up in Aesch, Baselland, Switzerland.

At the age of 6, she started performing in the circus for a period of ten years and at the age of seventeen, she began studying physical theater in Zürich. In the German language, said profession is called Bewegungs-Schauspielerin.

== Circus ==
At nineteen years old, Sprecher was one of seven people selected worldwide to be accepted into the prestigious École nationale de cirque of Montréal. She represented the school and its motherland Canada at the Wuqiao International Circus Festival (中国吴桥国际杂技艺术节) in Shijiazhuang, China with her Cloud swing act and won the Bronze Lion, which led to a guest-artist contract for the creation phase and the 3-year North-American tour of Cirque du Soleil’s Quidam.

== Television and film career ==
Due to Sprecher's background in the Circus arts - and especially due to her experience as a trapeze artist with Cirque du Soleil - she moved into the Hollywood stunt business and began her television and film career in the year 2001, when stunt coordinator and Second Unit Director Brian Smrz brought her in to perform comparable stunts— namely high Wire-flying, on Minority Report, starring Tom Cruise. This debut led to many more stunt assignments with some of the top stunt coordinators in the industry, allowing her to incorporate and accumulate a wide array of skill-sets. One of her most dangerous stunt performed to-date, is when she had to let herself get hit by a car on AMC's Feed the Beast, which aired August 2016.

== Filmography ==
Year	Film	Actress	Stunts	Role	Notes
2002	Minority Report	Yes	Yes	Pre-cog, Stunt-double	Main actor: Tom Cruise
2002	The Time Machine	Yes	No	Eloi	Main actor: Guy Pearce
2002	Men In Black II	Yes	No	Subway Character	Main actor: Will Smith
2002	The Shield	Yes	No	Twanya	Main actor: Michael Chiklis
2002	Scrubs	Yes	No	Nurse	Main actor: Zach Braff
2003	Pirates of the Caribbean: The Curse of the Black Pearl	Yes	Yes	Fighting Villager Woman, Stunt-double	Main actor: Johnny Depp
2003	She Spies	Yes	No	Secretary	Main actress: Natasha Henstridge
2003	Alias	No	Yes	Stunt-double	Main actress: Jennifer Garner
2003	Birds Of Prey	Yes	No	Runway Model With Machine Gun	Main actress: Ashley Scott
2004	Charmed	Yes	No	Harpy	Main actress: Alyssa Milano
2004	Taxi	No	Yes	Stunts	Main actress: Queen Latifah
2005	Aeon Flux	No	Yes	Stunt-double	Main actress: Charlize Theron
2006	The Shield	No	Yes	Stunt-double	Main actor: Michael Chiklis
2006	Drake & Josh	No	Yes	Stunt-double	Main actor: Drake Bell
2007	Jekyll	Yes	No	Christy-Monster	Main actor: Matt Keeslar
2008	Hancock	No	Yes	Stunt-double	Main actor: Will Smith
2008	Eagle Eye	No	Yes	Stunt-double	Main actor: Shia LaBeouf
2009	Cold Case	No	Yes	Stunt-double	Main actress: Kathryn Morris
2010	The Forgotten	No	Yes	Stunts	Main actor: Christian Slater
2011	Colombiana	No	Yes	Stunt-double	Main actress: Zoe Saldaña
2012	Flight	No	Yes	Stunt-double	Main actor: Denzel Washington
2013	The Haves And The Have Nots	No	Yes	Stunt-double	Main actress: Tika Sumpter
2014	Mercenaries	No	Yes	Stunt-double	Main actress: Zoë Bell
2015	Criminal Minds	No	Yes	Stunt-double	Main actor: Joe Mantegna
2016	Independence Day: Resurgence	No	Yes	Stunt-double	Main actor: Liam Hemsworth
2016	The Muppets	Yes	No	Aerial Instructor	Main actor: Eric Jacobson
2016	Feed the Beast	No	Yes	Stunt-double	Main actor: David Schwimmer
2016	Fifty Shades of Black	No	Yes	Stunt-double	Main actor: Marlon Wayans
2017	Scandal	No	Yes	Stunt-double	Main actress: Kerry Washington
2017	The House	No	Yes	Stunt-double	Main actor: Will Ferrell

== Award nominations ==
- 2009 Taurus World Stunt Awards, Eagle Eye, Best Overall Stunt by a Stunt Woman and Best High Work, doubling for Rosario Dawson
- 2009 Action Icon Awards, Eagle Eye, Stuntwoman Of The Year, doubling for Rosario Dawson
