= Seewen murder case =

1976 criminal case in Switzerland

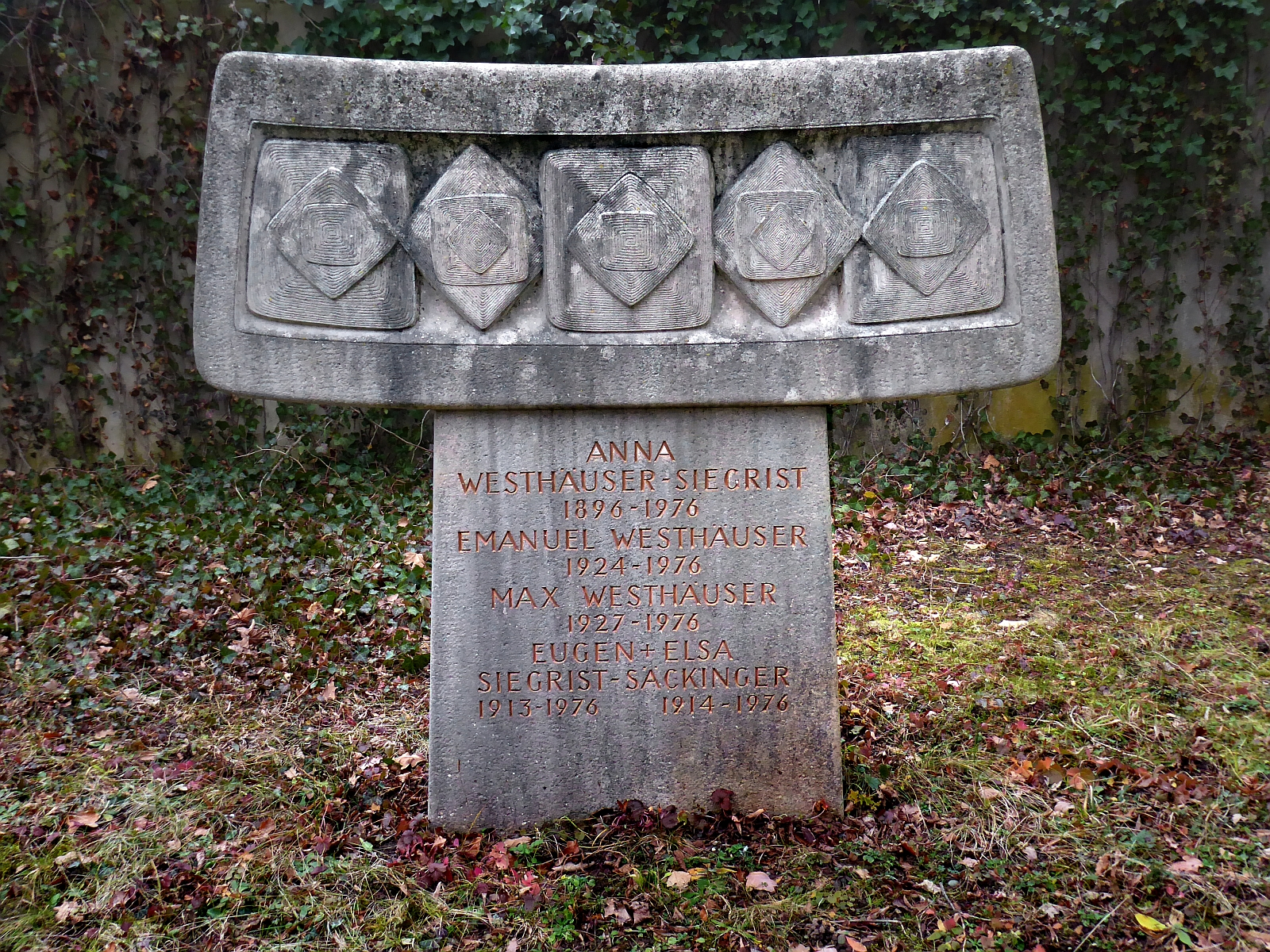
Grave marker for the victims.

The Seewen murder case (1976) was one of the biggest Swiss crime cases and is the biggest Swiss murder case. Five people were killed, and the suspect remained unknown after the 30-year statute of limitations had expired in 2006.

== Course of events ==
The killings took place on 5 June 1976 in a weekend house named "Waldeggli" that stood on a meadow by the forest edge near Seewen, Solothurn, Switzerland. Five people were killed with a Winchester rifle, with a total of 13 rounds being fired. Eleven of the shots hit the head of the victims while the other two shots hit the chest and arm of the victims. Robert Siegrist, the son of two of the victims Eugen and Elsa Siegrist-Säckinger, wrote in his book Der Mordfall Seewen that one of the victims was shot four times in the head, with each shot hitting the victim with precision.

The five victims were:

- Elsa Clara Siegrist-Säckinger (aged 62 at the time of death)
- Eugen Siegrist-Säckinger (63), husband of Elsa Siegrist-Säckinger
- Anna Westhäuser-Siegrist (80), sister of Eugen Siegrist
- Emanuel Westhäuser (52), son of Anna Westhäuser-Siegrist
- Max Westhäuser (49), son of Anna Westhäuser-Siegrist

The crime was discovered on 6 June 1976, by the daughter of two of the victims. When the police arrived, they found four corpses in the house with the fifth wrapped in a carpet on the terrace. It is suspected that only Elsa and Eugen Siegrist-Säckinger were meant to be killed, but the killer was surprised at the presence of the other three people and killed them as well.

== Suspects ==
=== Carl Doser ===
The criminal investigation department followed many leads and systematically searched for owners of Winchester rifles. However, there was little hope of finding the culprit until the autumn of 1996, when a Winchester rifle was found hidden in the walls of a kitchen of a house belonging to a woman named Doser. The gun, which belonged to Carl Doser, was an Italian Winchester imitation with a short barrel. It was identified as the weapon used to kill the victims.

It was discovered that Carl Doser was a loner living in Basel. He had legally bought the rifle in 1973 from Hofmann & Reinhart Waffen AG. He had earlier been interviewed by the police, but he lied, telling them he had sold the gun on the flea market. However, Doser was not charged because a clear motive for killing the victims could not be found, with no recorded meeting between Doser and the victims. However, the majority of the Swiss population still believe Doser was the killer.

=== Adolf "Johnny" Siegrist ===
A man named Hans Blaser felt that his business acquaintance Adolf "Johnny" Siegrist, who was related to the murdered couple, was the main culprit, with Doser assisting in the murder. Blaser, a combat shooter, claimed that Johnny had asked Blaser for a machine pistol.

The ammunition was bought three weeks before the crime, from R. Mayer AG at the Basler Steinenvorstadt, and was likely to have been bought by Johnny. The shop assistant at R. Mayer AG recalled that the man who bought the ammunition had asked for two packages of Kal. 38 Spez ammunition, with each package containing 50 rounds. The customer had asked for ammunition with extra heavy lead bullets and had asked if the rounds would fit in his Italian Winchester rifles. He had mentioned that he was obtaining the ammunition for someone else.

Johnny was described as being occasionally irascible, and styropore heads that had been shot through were discovered in his flat. It is suspected that his motive for killing the victims was related to his relationship with the victims. In addition, Johnny, who was 1.5m tall and had a voice that sounded like a woman's voice, had an inferiority complex which could have played a part in his motive for killing the victims. It was also suspected that he wanted revenge against the Siegrist-Säckinger couple for having nicknamed him "Dölfeli", which is a belittling name for "Adolf", and "Globi", which is the name of a Swiss children's book's protagonist. He was arrested temporarily but died in the mid-1980s.

== See also ==
- List of unsolved murders (1900–1979)
