= Baslerweiher =

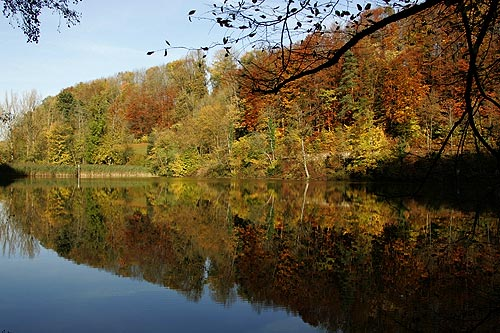

- Location within Canton of Solothurn Location within Switzerland Location within Alps
- Interactive map of Baslerweiher
- Location: Seewen, Canton of Solothurn
- Coordinates: 47°25′37″N 7°39′43″E
- Type: artificial lake
- Basin countries: Switzerland
- Water volume: 0.150 million cubic metres (122 acre⋅ft)
- Surface elevation: 550 m (1,800 ft)

Baslerweiher (literally "Pond of Basel") is an artificial pond in Seewen, Canton of Solothurn, Switzerland. Its dam was built in 1870 to supply water to Basel.
