= Pfeffingen Castle =

Castle ruins in Pfeffingen, Switzerland

- Pfeffingen
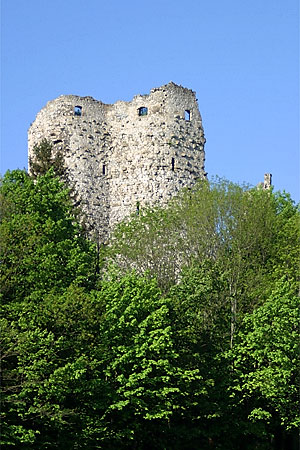
- Ruined tower of Pfeffingen Castle

Site information
- Type: hill castle
- Code: CH-BL
- Condition: ruin

Location
- Coordinates: 47°27′12″N 7°35′29″E

Site history
- Built: about 1135

Aerial views of Pfeffingen Castle.

Pfeffingen Castle (German: Ruine Pfeffingen) is a castle in the municipality of Pfeffingen of the canton of Basel-Land in Switzerland. It is a Swiss heritage site of national significance.

Pfeffingen Castle is one of the largest castle ruins in the Basel-Land canton. The area around Aesch and Pfeffingen was originally home to a Franconian royal court. However, no remains have persisted since this time. In 1135 Notker von Pfeffingen was mentioned for the first time, which was probably a reference to Count von Saugers.

At the end of the 12th century, the Pfeffingen castle fell to the Count of Thierstein. In 1212 a family of Schaffner von Pfeffingen, who lived in the castle, was mentioned for the first time. In the mid-13th century the castle was comprehensively rebuilt. At this time, the curtain wall and the large residential tower were built. In 1335, the Bishop of Basel besieged the castle without success.

In 1356, the Basel Earthquake damaged Pfeffingen castle. When the Counts of Thierstein-Pfeffingen tried to expand their rule, it led into conflict with the city of Basel, whereupon the Basel army successfully besieged the castle in 1376 and burned it down. The castle was restored after this.

In the 15th century Pfeffingen was conquered several times in wars between Austrian Habsburgs and Swiss armies (during the Old Zürich War). In 1520, the Mayor of Basel Jakob Meyer zum Hasen raided the castle with about two hundred men. The castle, heavily damaged by the numerous wars, could not be maintained. In 1571, a new residential building was built as a replacement for the old residential tower, and a tower-defended gate and a bridge were built in the eastern part of the complex.

During the Thirty Years′ War in 1637 the castle was occupied by Swedish troops under Bernhard of Saxe-Weimar and, eleven years later, was left (in very poor condition) to the bishop. Around 1750 the castle was finally abandoned by the Blarer family of Wartensee, who moved to Aesch Castle. Afterwards, a hermit lived temporarily in the castle. In 1761, the castle was auctioned for demolition and then fell rapidly.

After preparatory work in 2011 and 2012, construction work began in May 2013, overseen by ZPF Ingenieure. As the lime mortar that is used there can only be worked with when there is no frost, i.e. in the warmer half of the year, the work was projected to take around six years. As the largest and most seriously damaged part of the ruins, the residential tower was to be reconstructed first, with a particular focus on sealing the coping and structurally securing unstable sections. The goal of the work was to repair the existing damage and to preserve the historical structure.

== See also ==
- List of castles in Switzerland
