= Lake Seewen =

Lake in Solothurn, Switzerland

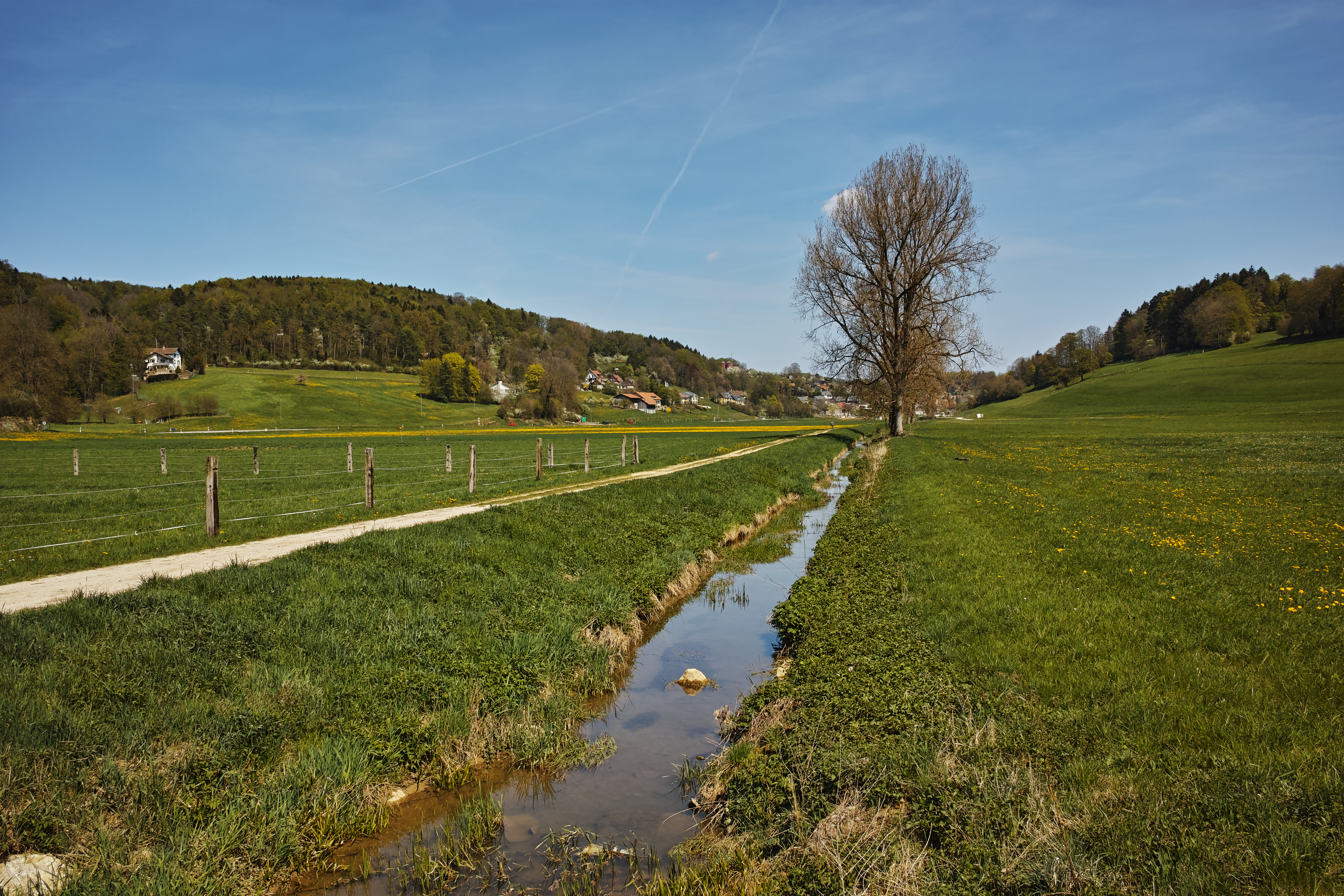
- Stream Seebach in the area of the former lake, view towards Seewen village.

- Location within Canton of Solothurn Location within Switzerland Location within Alps
- Interactive map of Lake Seewen
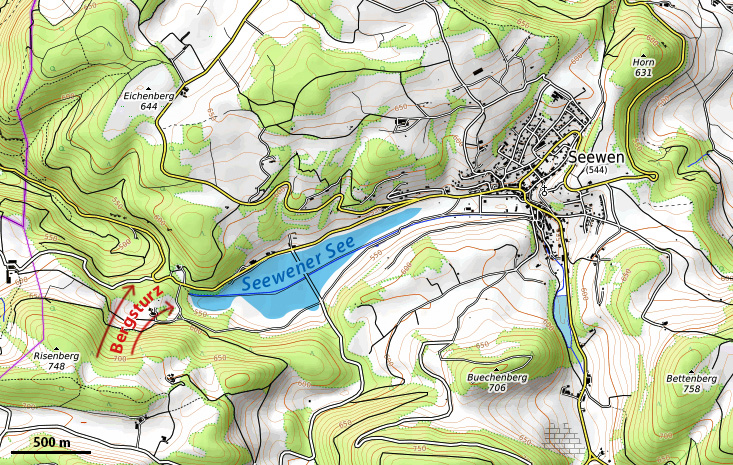
- Approximate area of former Lake Seewen.
- Location: Seewen, Canton of Solothurn
- Coordinates: 47°26′05.66″N 7°39′30.22″E
- Basin countries: Switzerland

Lake Seewen (German: Seewener See) is a former lake in Seewen, Canton of Solothurn, in Switzerland. It was drained in the late 16th century.

== History ==
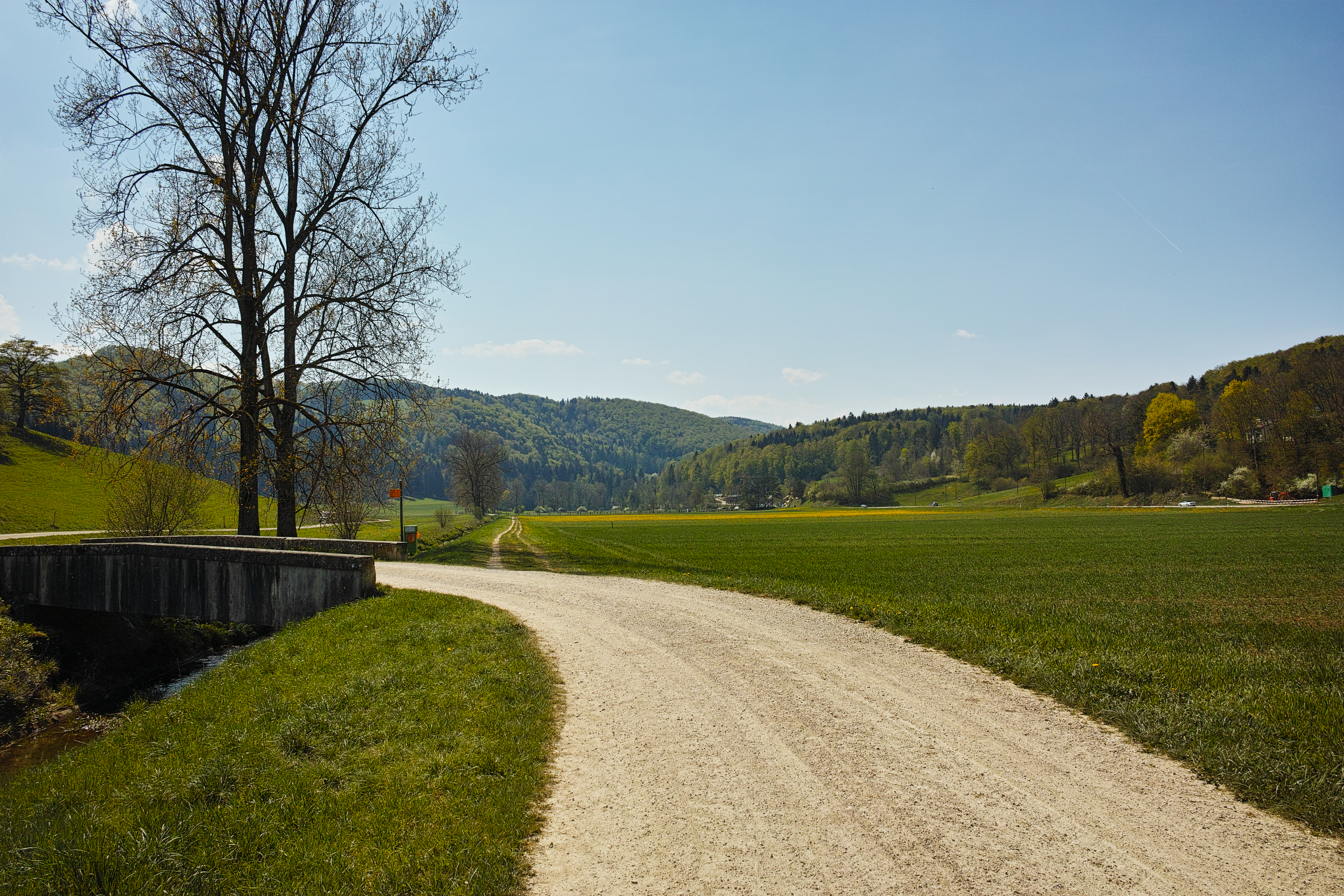
The drained area.

The lake was formed 8000 years ago following a rockslide that ponded the village's brook behind it. It had a length of about 2 km when full. The name of the village, "Seewen" (Old High German for "at the lakes"), comes from its location near the lake. In the 15th century inhabitants attempted to drain the lake to prevent annoying plagues of mosquitos. In 1588, a 200-metre tunnel was constructed through the rockslide mass which had caused the lake to silt up. The area subsequently became a wetland until being completely drained in 1923.

In 2003, two-thirds of the inhabitants voted to rebuild the lake following a feasibility study by the University of Basel. In 2012, a revitalization project was started by the regional tourism society to develop the area for tourism. The project is supported by the Basel rowing club and the village's mayor, Philippe Weber.
