= Duggingen =

- Municipality
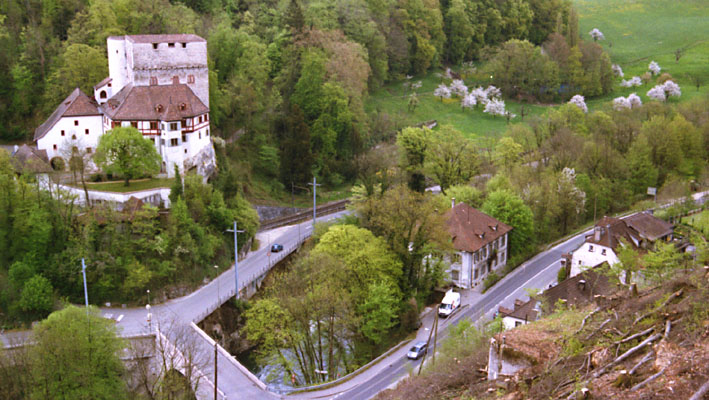

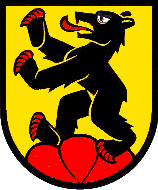
- Coat of arms
- Location of Duggingen
- Location within Switzerland Location within Canton of Basel-Landschaft
- Coordinates: 47°27′N 7°36′E
- Country: Switzerland
- Canton: Basel-Landschaft
- District: Laufen

Area
  - Total: 5.87 km^{2} (2.27 sq mi)
- Elevation: 339 m (1,112 ft)

Population (June 2021)
  - Total: 1,550
  - Density: 264/km^{2} (684/sq mi)
- Time zone: UTC+01:00 (CET)
  - Summer (DST): UTC+02:00 (CEST)
- Postal code: 4202
- SFOS number: 2785
- ISO 3166 code: CH-BL
- Surrounded by: Aesch, Dornach (SO), Grellingen, Himmelried (SO), Hochwald (SO), Pfeffingen, Seewen (SO)
- Website: duggingen.ch

Duggingen is a municipality in the district of Laufen in the canton of Basel-Country in Switzerland.

== History ==
Duggingen is first mentioned around 1330 as Tuggingen. However, archaeological findings prove that the area was already settled during the Roman era. Duggingen belonged to the lordship of Pfeffingen and thus to the Diocese of Basel. The fief was held from 1330 by the knights Jakob and Johannes von Hofstetten; additionally, several liege lords were appointed by the bishop: the lords of Bärenfels, Angenstein, and Thierstein, as well as temporarily Heinrich von Ostheim, a servant of Count Heinrich von Thierstein. In 1815, following a decision by the Congress of Vienna, the municipality was assigned to the Canton of Bern. Regarding the question of the Laufen Valley's (Laufental) change of canton, the municipality rejected joining the Canton of Basel-Landschaft during the first referendum in 1983, but approved it six years later. The official transition took place in 1994.

== Geography ==
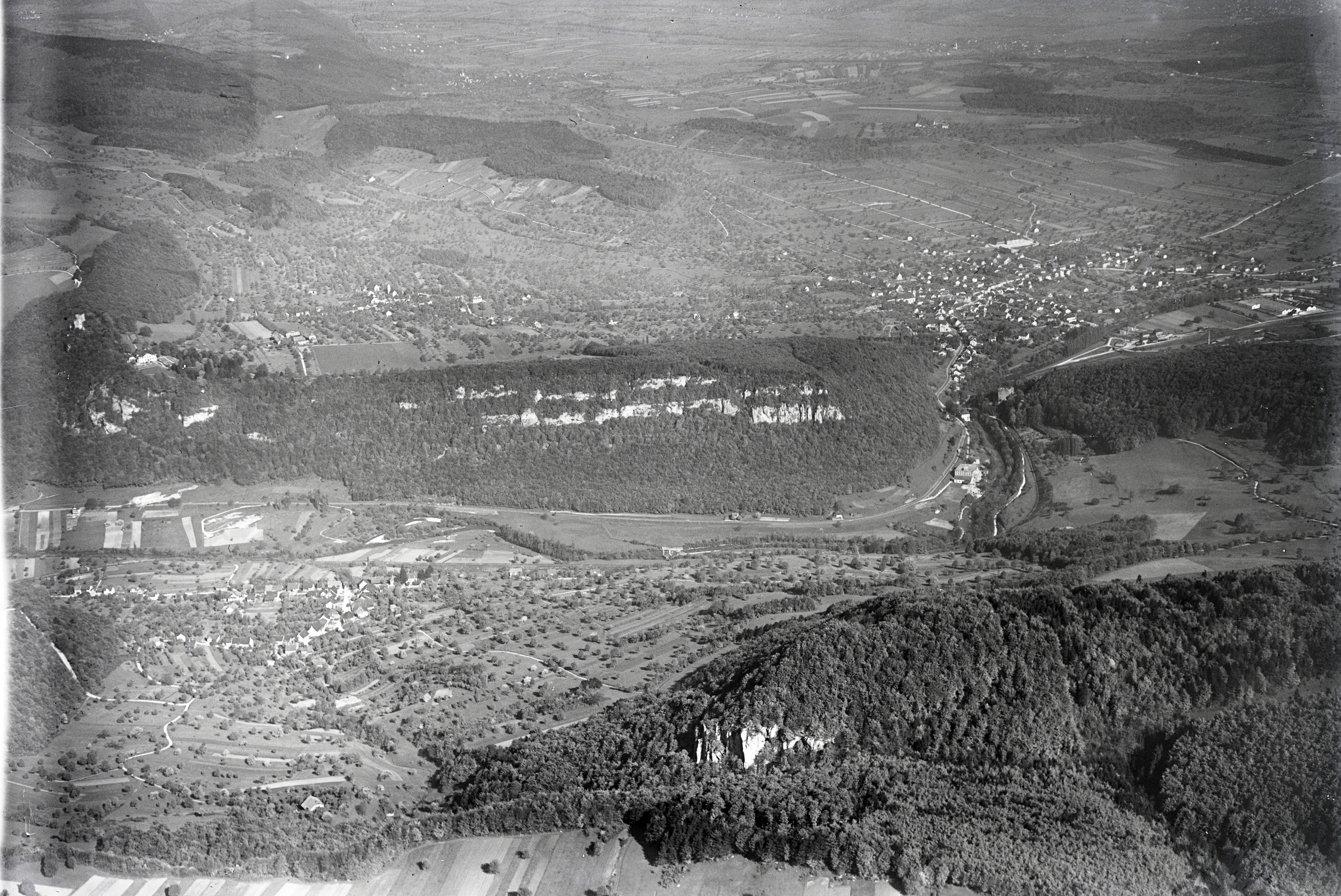
Aerial view from 900 m by Walter Mittelholzer (1930)

Duggingen has an area, as of 2009, of 5.87 square kilometers (2.27 sq mi). Of this area, 1.7 km^{2} (0.66 sq mi) or 29.0% is used for agricultural purposes, while 3.37 km^{2} (1.30 sq mi) or 57.4% is forested. Of the rest of the land, 0.75 km^{2} (0.29 sq mi) or 12.8% is settled (buildings or roads), 0.08 km^{2} (20 acres) or 1.4% is either rivers or lakes.

Of the built up area, housing and buildings made up 5.6% and transportation infrastructure made up 4.8%. Out of the forested land, 51.3% of the total land area is heavily forested and 6.1% is covered with orchards or small clusters of trees. Of the agricultural land, 8.7% is used for growing crops and 17.2% is pastures, while 3.1% is used for orchards or vine crops. All the water in the municipality is flowing water.

The municipality is located in the Laufen district, on a terrace above the last ravine of the Birs valley. It consists of the linear village of Duggingen.

== Coat of arms ==
The blazon of the municipal coat of arms is Or, a Bear salient Sable, armed, langued, and in his virility Gules, on Coupeaux of the third.

== Demographics ==
Duggingen has a population (as of June 2021) of 1,550. As of 2008, 14.6% of the population are resident foreign nationals. Over the last 10 years (1997–2007) the population has changed at a rate of 29.6%.

Most of the population (as of 2000) speaks German (1,085 or 93.4%), with French being second most common (24 or 2.1%) and Italian language being third (9 or 0.8%). There is 1 person who speaks Romansh.

As of 2008, the gender distribution of the population was 50.1% male and 49.9% female. The population was made up of 1,194 Swiss citizens (83.5% of the population), and 236 non-Swiss residents (16.5%). Of the population in the municipality, 292 or about 25.1% were born in Duggingen and lived there in 2000. There were 277 or 23.8% who were born in the same canton, while 399 or 34.3% were born somewhere else in Switzerland, and 144 or 12.4% were born outside of Switzerland.

In 2008 there were 13 live births to Swiss citizens and 1 birth to non-Swiss citizens, and in same time span there were 12 deaths of Swiss citizens and 1 non-Swiss citizen death. Ignoring immigration and emigration, the population of Swiss citizens increased by 1 while the foreign population remained the same. There was 1 Swiss man who immigrated back to Switzerland and 2 Swiss women who emigrated from Switzerland. At the same time, there were 11 non-Swiss men and 6 non-Swiss women who immigrated from another country to Switzerland. The total Swiss population change in 2008 (from all sources, including moves across municipal borders) was an increase of 18 and the non-Swiss population change was an increase of 13 people. This represents a population growth rate of 2.3%.

The age distribution, as of 2010, in Duggingen is; 106 children or 7.4% of the population are between 0 and 6 years old and 226 teenagers or 15.8% are between 7 and 19. Of the adult population, 136 people or 9.5% of the population are between 20 and 29 years old. 178 people or 12.4% are between 30 and 39, 292 people or 20.4% are between 40 and 49, and 307 people or 21.5% are between 50 and 64. The senior population distribution is 146 people or 10.2% of the population are between 65 and 79 years old and there are 39 people or 2.7% who are over 80.

As of 2000, there were 468 people who were single and never married in the municipality. There were 587 married individuals, 49 widows or widowers and 58 individuals who are divorced.

As of 2000, there were 473 private households in the municipality, and an average of 2.4 persons per household. There were 124 households that consist of only one person and 32 households with five or more people. Out of a total of 488 households that answered this question, 25.4% were households made up of just one person and 4 were adults who lived with their parents. Of the rest of the households, there are 162 married couples without children, 160 married couples with children. There were 15 single parents with a child or children. There were 8 households that were made up unrelated people and 15 households that were made some sort of institution or another collective housing.

In 2000 there were 249 single-family homes (or 71.6% of the total) out of a total of 348 inhabited buildings. There were 47 multi-family buildings (13.5%), along with 32 multi-purpose buildings that were mostly used for housing (9.2%) and 20 other use buildings (commercial or industrial) that also had some housing (5.7%). Of the single-family homes 22 were built before 1919, while 43 were built between 1990 and 2000. The greatest number of single-family homes (63) were built between 1981 and 1990.

In 2000 there were 499 apartments in the municipality. The most common apartment size was 4 rooms of which there were 158. There were 16 single room apartments and 187 apartments with five or more rooms. Of these apartments, a total of 462 apartments (92.6% of the total) were permanently occupied, while 26 apartments (5.2%) were seasonally occupied, and 11 apartments (2.2%) were empty. As of 2007, the construction rate of new housing units was 13.3 new units per 1000 residents. As of 2000 the average price to rent a two-room apartment was about 1067.00 CHF (US$850, £480, €680), a three-room apartment was about 1092.00 CHF (US$870, £490, €700) and a four-room apartment cost an average of 1556.00 CHF (US$1240, £700, €1000). The vacancy rate for the municipality, in 2008, was 0%.

The historical population is given in the following chart:

== Heritage sites of national significance ==
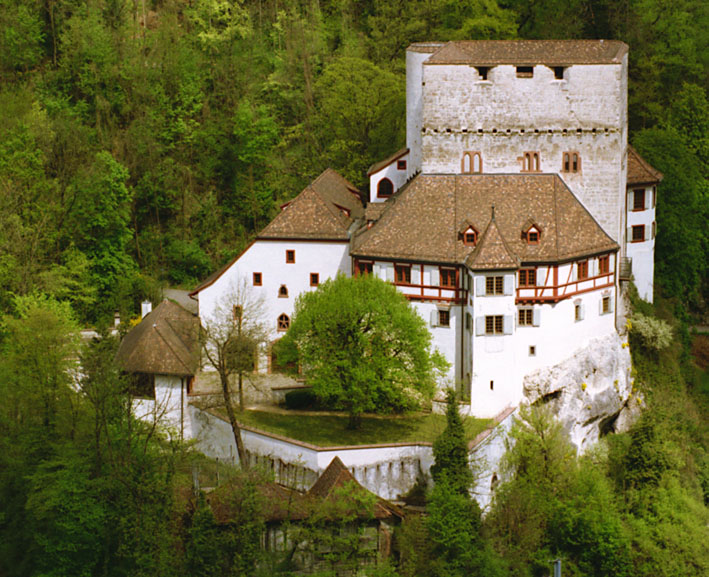
Angenstein Castle

Angenstein Castle is listed as a Swiss heritage site of national significance. The entire Angenstein site is part of the Inventory of Swiss Heritage Sites.

== Politics ==
In the 2007 federal election the most popular party was the SVP which received 31.58% of the vote. The next three most popular parties were the SP (25.31%), the Green Party (15.42%) and the FDP (14.27%). In the federal election, a total of 378 votes were cast, and the voter turnout was 40.7%.

== Economy ==
As of 2007, Duggingen had an unemployment rate of 2.17%. As of 2005, there were 22 people employed in the primary economic sector and about 10 businesses involved in this sector. 249 people were employed in the secondary sector and there were 17 businesses in this sector. 135 people were employed in the tertiary sector, with 39 businesses in this sector. There were 580 residents of the municipality who were employed in some capacity, of which females made up 43.6% of the workforce.

In 2008 the total number of full-time equivalent jobs was 475. The number of jobs in the primary sector was 12, all of which were in agriculture. The number of jobs in the secondary sector was 302, of which 260 or (86.1%) were in manufacturing and 43 (14.2%) were in construction. The number of jobs in the tertiary sector was 161. In the tertiary sector, 53 or 32.9% were in wholesale or retail sales or the repair of motor vehicles, 15 or 9.3% were in the movement and storage of goods, 10 or 6.2% were in a hotel or restaurant, 6 or 3.7% were technical professionals or scientists, 58 or 36.0% were in education. In 2000, there were 338 workers who commuted into the municipality and 475 workers who commuted away. The municipality is a net exporter of workers, with about 1.4 workers leaving the municipality for each one entering. About 10.4% of the workforce coming into Duggingen are coming from outside Switzerland. Of the working population, 21.4% used public transportation to get to work, and 52.4% used a private car.

== Religion ==
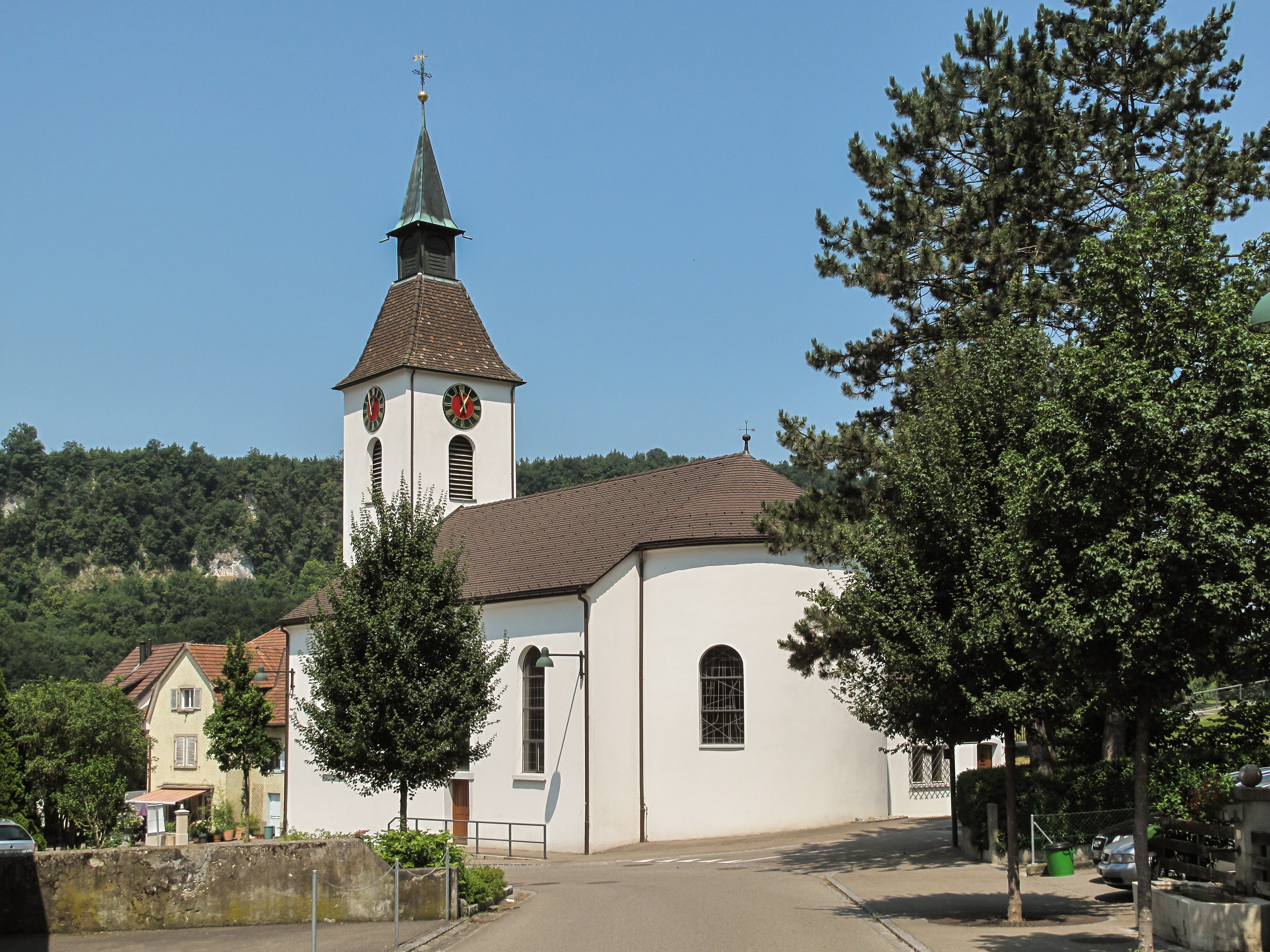
Roman Catholic church of Duggingen

From the 2000 census, 502 or 43.2% were Roman Catholic, while 315 or 27.1% belonged to the Swiss Reformed Church. Of the rest of the population, there was 1 member of an Orthodox church who belonged, there were 4 individuals (or about 0.34% of the population) who belonged to the Christian Catholic Church, and there were 47 individuals (or about 4.04% of the population) who belonged to another Christian church. There were 4 individuals (or about 0.34% of the population) who were Jewish, and 9 (or about 0.77% of the population) who were Islamic. There were 2 individuals who were Buddhist. 228 (or about 19.62% of the population) belonged to no church, are agnostic or atheist, and 50 individuals (or about 4.30% of the population) did not answer the question.

== Transport ==
Duggingen sits on the Basel–Biel/Bienne line and is served by local trains at Duggingen.

== Education ==
In Duggingen about 498 or (42.9%) of the population have completed non-mandatory upper secondary education, and 159 or (13.7%) have completed additional higher education (either university or a Fachhochschule). Of the 159 who completed tertiary schooling, 59.1% were Swiss men, 24.5% were Swiss women, 8.2% were non-Swiss men and 8.2% were non-Swiss women. As of 2000, there were 349 students in Duggingen who came from another municipality, while 99 residents attended schools outside the municipality.
