= Zwingen railway station =

Railway station in Switzerland

Zwingen
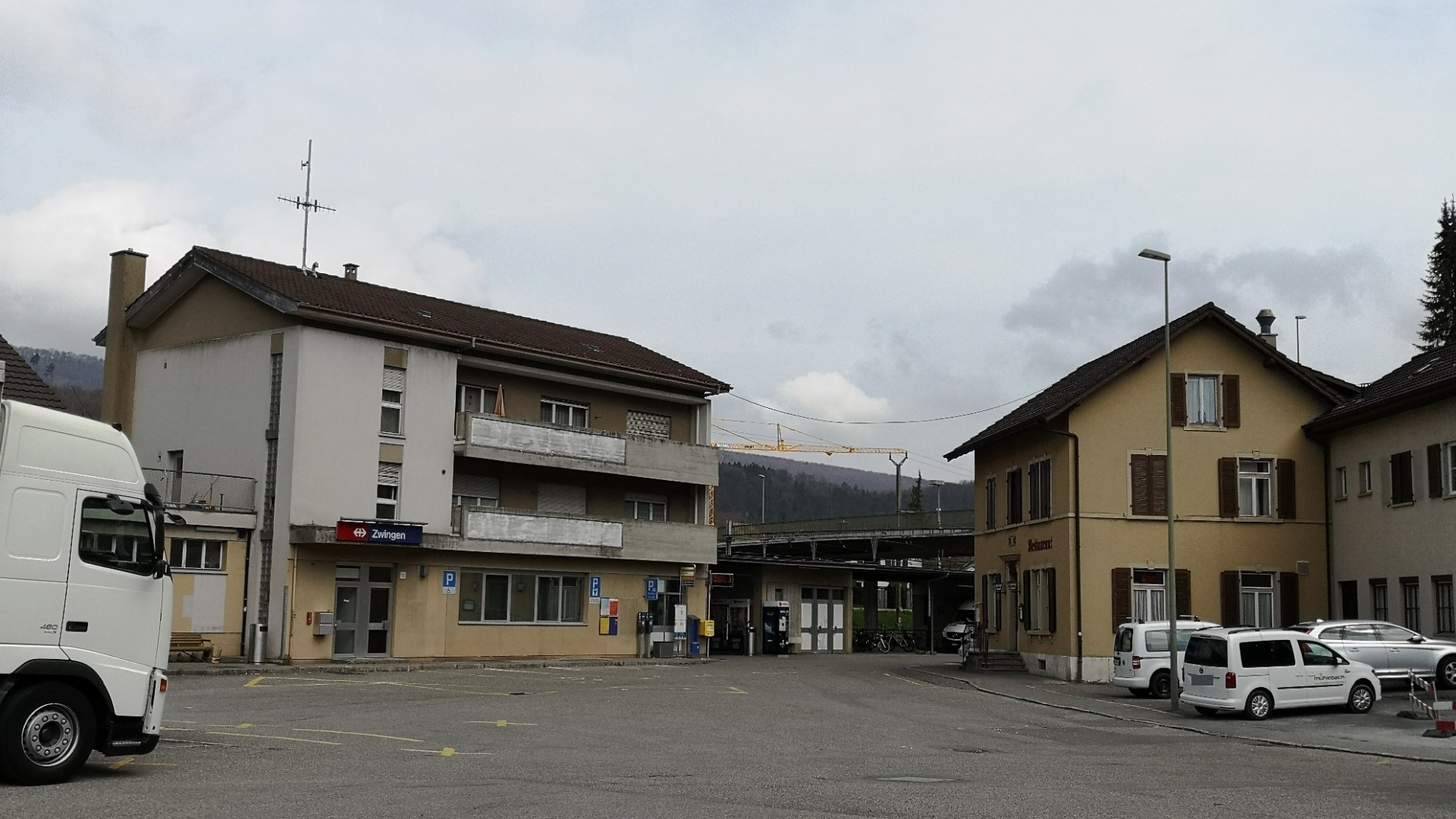
- The station building in 2019

General information
- Location: Zwingen; Switzerland
- Coordinates: 47°26′1.54″N 7°31′48.72″E
- Owner: Swiss Federal Railways
- Line: Basel–Biel/Bienne line
- Train operators: Swiss Federal Railways

Services
Preceding station	Basel S-Bahn	Following station
Laufen towards Delémont	S3	Grellingen towards Olten
Laufen Terminus	S31	Grellingen towards Basel SBB
Location
- Location within Switzerland

Zwingen railway station (German: Bahnhof Zwingen) is a railway station in the municipality of Zwingen, in the Swiss canton of Basel-Landschaft. It is an intermediate stop on the Basel–Biel/Bienne line and is served by local trains only.

== Services ==
As of the December 2025 timetable change, the following services stop at Zwingen:

- Basel S-Bahn /: half-hourly service between Olten and Laufen with additional peak-hour service to Basel SBB and two trains per day to Delémont.
