= Alfred Vogel =

Swiss herbalist and naturopath

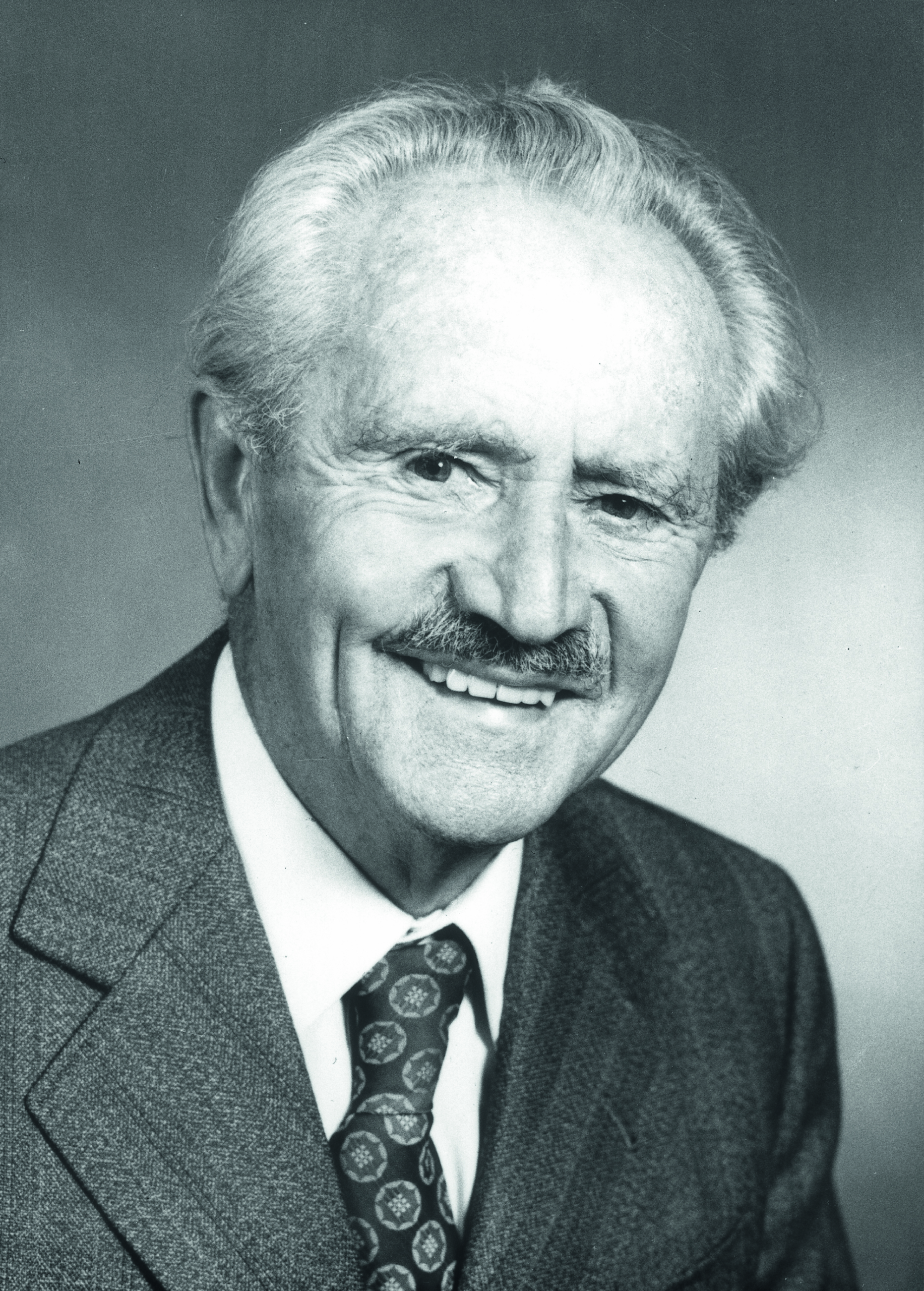
- Born: October 26, 1902; Aesch
- Died: October 1, 1996 (aged 93); Feusisberg
- Occupations: Herbalist, naturopath
- Honours: Doctor honoris causa for botanical studies (University of California, Los Angeles, 1952) (Note: disputed)

Alfred Max Vogel (October 26, 1902 – October 1, 1996) was a Swiss herbalist, naturopath and writer.

== Life ==
Alfred Max Vogel was born in 1902 in Aesch, Basel, Switzerland. At the age of 21, he moved to Basel to manage a health store. In 1927, he married Sophie Sommer; together they had two daughters. In 1929, he started publishing a monthly magazine, Das Neue Leben ("The New Life"). From 1941, this became A. Vogel Gesundheits-Nachrichten ("A. Vogel Health News").

From 1935, he operated a spa/guesthouse in Trogen where he produced extracts. Vogel then relocated to Teufen in Appenzell to open a clinic and he went on to found health stores in Zürich, Solothurn, and Bern. In 1963, he founded Bioforce AG (Roggwil, Thurgau) to scale production, where he continued adjusting recipes to evolving pharmaceutical standards into the early 1990s. Vogel was an avid traveller and enjoyed visiting new countries and meeting new cultures. He was especially interested in meeting indigenous peoples in a close relationship with nature. From the 1950s onward, he travelled extensively through Africa, North America, Oceania, and South America.

On one of his travels he met and stayed with the Sioux in the United States. The story goes that he befriended Ben Black Elk, son of medicine man Nicholas Black Elk, who Vogel says, taught him about the Native American herbal tradition. However, Ben Black Elk was known to be merely earning his bread as an actor by having taken pictures of him with tourists near Mount Rushmore for money, also starring in the 1962 film How the West Was Won. Upon Vogel's departure, Ben Black Elk allegedly gave him a farewell present: a handful of seeds of Echinacea purpurea (purple coneflower). Back in Switzerland, Vogel began cultivating and researching the plant, eventually creating Echinaforce, which would become his flagship product. Histories of Swiss complementary medicine credit him with helping to popularize Echinacea and advance fresh-plant industrial phytotherapy.

Being a member of Jehovah's Witnesses, Vogel preached that God prohibited blood transfusions.

He died in 1996 in Feusisberg at the age of 93. The New Zealand-based bakery and cereal company Vogel's is named after him.

== Criticism ==
For years, Alfred Vogel was falsely known as Doctor Vogel or Dr. Vogel. According to some sources, however, Vogel received an honorary doctorate in botanical studies in 1952 from the University of California, Los Angeles (UCLA), allowing the styling "Alfred Vogel, doctor H.C." and the honorary title "Doctor Vogel". Jan Willem Nienhuys claimed that he obtained his honorary degree from California University of Liberal Physicians (CULP) situated in Los Angeles, an institute that was dissolved long ago and whose legitimacy of its diplomas is disputed. Because he was not a physician, but did sell 'natural medicines', the title Doctor or Dr. Vogel implied an invalid association. After a complaint in 1981 at the Dutch Advertising Standards Authority (Dutch: Reclame Code Commissie), he and his products were gradually no longer called Doctor.

On October 14, 1982, Dutch teacher, presenter and comedian Ivo de Wijs published an article in the science section of NRC Handelsblad on this matter, in which he branded Vogel a quack.

Vogel was criticized for justifying his opposition to blood transfusions by claiming that they could lead to a change in character in older editions of Der kleine Doktor (published in English as "The Nature Doctor").

During a November 2014 episode of the satirical television show Zondag met Lubach, Vogel's "invention" of Echinaforce was criticised and mocked.

== Institutions, awards, and legacy ==
- Alfred-Vogel-Stiftung (Foundation) established 1984; Alfred-Vogel-Museum opened 1991 in Teufen; exhibitions in Aesch document his life
- Recognitions reported by Swiss biographical references include the Priessnitz Medal (1982) and honorary membership of SAGEM (1984)

== Selected publications ==
- Kleiner Wegweiser für die Lebensreform ("How to Reform Your Life") (1926)
- Die Nahrung als Heilfaktor ("Nature as a Healing Factor") (1935)
- Erblehre und Rassenkunde in bildlicher Darstellung ("Heredity and Racial Science in Images") (1938)
- Der kleine Doktor ("The Nature Doctor") (1952)
- Die Leber als Regulator der Gesundheit ("The Liver as a Regulator of Health") (1960)
- Gesundheitsführer durch südliche Länder ("Health Guide to Southern Countries") (1972)
- Krebs – Schicksal oder Zivilisationskrankheit? ("Cancer – Fate or the Disease of Civilisation") (1982)
