= Aesch =

Aesch may refer to:

- Aesch, Basel-Landschaft, a municipality in the Swiss canton of Basel-Landschaft
- Aesch, Lucerne, a municipality in the Swiss canton of Lucerne
- Aesch, Zürich, a municipality in the Swiss canton of Zürich
- Aesch bei Neftenbach, a hamlet in the municipality of Neftenbach in the Swiss canton of Zürich
