= Seewen, Solothurn =

Seewen
- Municipality
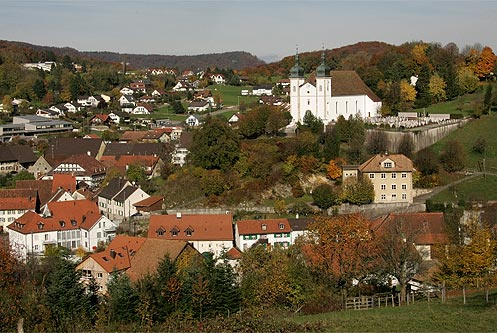

- Flag Coat of arms
- Location of Seewen
- Location within Switzerland Location within Canton of Solothurn
- Coordinates: 47°26′N 7°40′E
- Country: Switzerland
- Canton: Solothurn
- District: Dorneck

Area
  - Total: 16.3 km^{2} (6.3 sq mi)
- Elevation: 544 m (1,785 ft)

Population (December 2020)
  - Total: 1,022
  - Density: 62.7/km^{2} (162/sq mi)
- Time zone: UTC+01:00 (CET)
  - Summer (DST): UTC+02:00 (CEST)
- Postal code: 4206
- SFOS number: 2480
- ISO 3166 code: CH-SO
- Surrounded by: Bretzwil (BL), Büren, Duggingen (BL), Himmelried, Hochwald, Lupsingen (BL), Nunningen, Reigoldswil (BL), Ziefen (BL)
- Website: www.seewen.ch

Seewen (German pronunciation: [ˈzeːˌvn̩]; Swiss German: Seebe) is a municipality in the district of Dorneck in the canton of Solothurn in Switzerland. Baslerweiher is a pond above the village.

== History ==
Aerial view (1953)

Seewen is first mentioned in 1147 as Sewin. The village's name means "at the lakes" in Old High German, a reference to the former Lake Seewen that was drained in the late 16th century.

== Seewen murder case ==
During Pentecost 1976 one of the most important Swiss murder cases happened: near the weekend house "Waldeggli", five were killed brutally. The Seewen murder case counts as one of the biggest unsolved crimes in Swiss criminal history.

== Geography ==
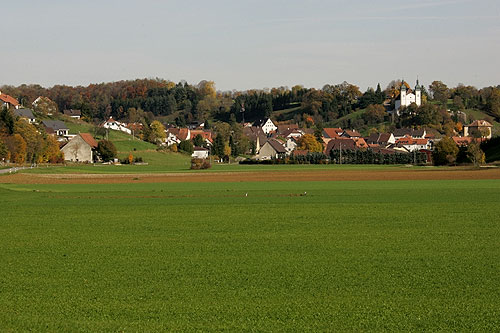
Seewen village and surroundings

Seewen has an area, as of 2009, of 16.3 square kilometers (6.3 sq mi). Of this area, 6.57 km^{2} (2.54 sq mi) or 40.3% is used for agricultural purposes, while 8.81 km^{2} (3.40 sq mi) or 54.0% is forested. Of the rest of the land, 0.95 km^{2} (0.37 sq mi) or 5.8% is settled (buildings or roads), 0.06 km^{2} (15 acres) or 0.4% is either rivers or lakes.

Of the built up area, housing and buildings made up 3.1% and transportation infrastructure made up 1.7%. Out of the forested land, 50.2% of the total land area is heavily forested and 3.9% is covered with orchards or small clusters of trees. Of the agricultural land, 9.9% is used for growing crops and 24.2% is pastures, while 4.1% is used for orchards or vine crops and 2.1% is used for alpine pastures. Of the water in the municipality, 0.2% is in lakes and 0.2% is in rivers and streams.

The municipality is located in the Dorneck district. It consists of the village of Seewen and the settlements of Steinegg, Moos, Unterackert and Rechtenberg.

== Coat of arms ==
The blazon of the municipal coat of arms is Per fess wavy Gules a Mullet Argent between four, two and two, Reed Panicles proper and of the second a Fish Azure naiant.

== Demographics ==
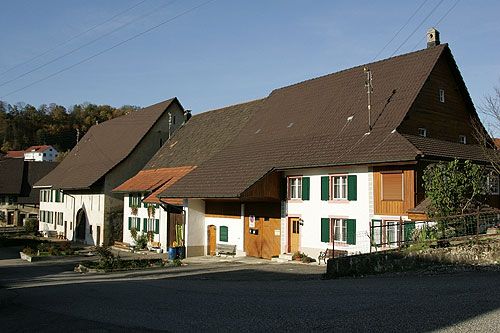
Houses in Seewen

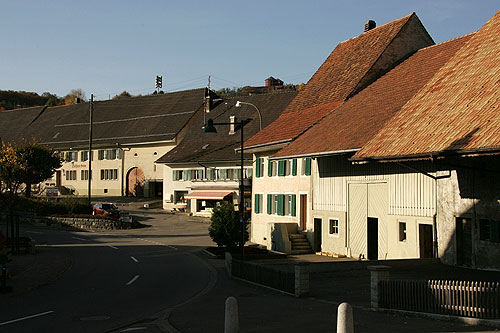
Houses in Seewen

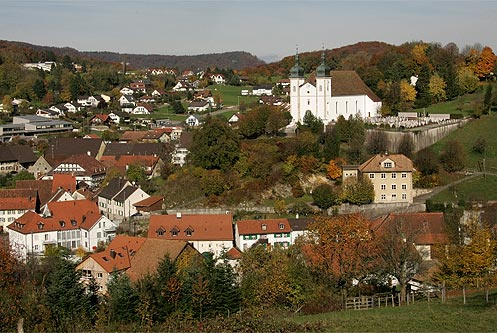
Church of St.German and the village of Seewen

Seewen has a population (as of December 2020) of 1,022. As of 2008, 7.4% of the population are resident foreign nationals. Over the last 10 years (1999–2009 ) the population has changed at a rate of 5.2%.

Most of the population (as of 2000) speaks German (911 or 95.1%), with Italian being second most common (8 or 0.8%) and French being third (7 or 0.7%). There are 3 fluent English speakers. There is 1 person who speaks Romansh.

As of 2008, the gender distribution of the population was 49.2% male and 50.8% female. The population was made up of 463 Swiss men (44.7% of the population) and 46 (4.4%) non-Swiss men. There were 480 Swiss women (46.4%) and 46 (4.4%) non-Swiss women. Of the population in the municipality 408 or about 42.6% were born in Seewen and lived there in 2000. There were 100 or 10.4% who were born in the same canton, while 324 or 33.8% were born somewhere else in Switzerland, and 90 or 9.4% were born outside of Switzerland.

In 2008 there were 8 live births to Swiss citizens and 1 birth to non-Swiss citizens, and in same time span there were 3 deaths of Swiss citizens. Ignoring immigration and emigration, the population of Swiss citizens increased by 5 while the foreign population increased by 1. There was 1 Swiss woman who immigrated back to Switzerland. At the same time, there were 5 non-Swiss men and 2 non-Swiss women who immigrated from another country to Switzerland. The total Swiss population change in 2008 (from all sources, including moves across municipal borders) was an increase of 9 and the non-Swiss population increased by 7 people. This represents a population growth rate of 1.6%.

The age distribution, as of 2000, in Seewen is; 88 children or 9.2% of the population are between 0 and 6 years old and 155 teenagers or 16.2% are between 7 and 19. Of the adult population, 35 people or 3.7% of the population are between 20 and 24 years old. 315 people or 32.9% are between 25 and 44, and 222 people or 23.2% are between 45 and 64. The senior population distribution is 110 people or 11.5% of the population are between 65 and 79 years old and there are 33 people or 3.4% who are over 80.

As of 2000, there were 390 people who were single and never married in the municipality. There were 484 married individuals, 44 widows or widowers and 41 individuals who are divorced.

As of 2000, there were 383 private households in the municipality, and an average of 2.5 persons per household. There were 106 households that consist of only one person and 30 households with five or more people. Out of a total of 390 households that answered this question, 27.2% were households made up of just one person and there were 2 adults who lived with their parents. Of the rest of the households, there are 125 married couples without children, 137 married couples with children There were 10 single parents with a child or children. There were 3 households that were made up of unrelated people and 7 households that were made up of some sort of institution or another collective housing.

In 2000 there were 210 single family homes (or 59.0% of the total) out of a total of 356 inhabited buildings. There were 46 multi-family buildings (12.9%), along with 79 multi-purpose buildings that were mostly used for housing (22.2%) and 21 other use buildings (commercial or industrial) that also had some housing (5.9%). Of the single family homes 31 were built before 1919, while 57 were built between 1990 and 2000. The greatest number of single family homes (45) were built between 1981 and 1990.

In 2000 there were 469 apartments in the municipality. The most common apartment size was 4 rooms of which there were 121. There were 12 single room apartments and 157 apartments with five or more rooms. Of these apartments, a total of 373 apartments (79.5% of the total) were permanently occupied, while 53 apartments (11.3%) were seasonally occupied and 43 apartments (9.2%) were empty. As of 2009, the construction rate of new housing units was 2 new units per 1000 residents. The vacancy rate for the municipality, in 2010, was 2.51%.

The historical population is given in the following chart:

== Heritage sites of national significance ==
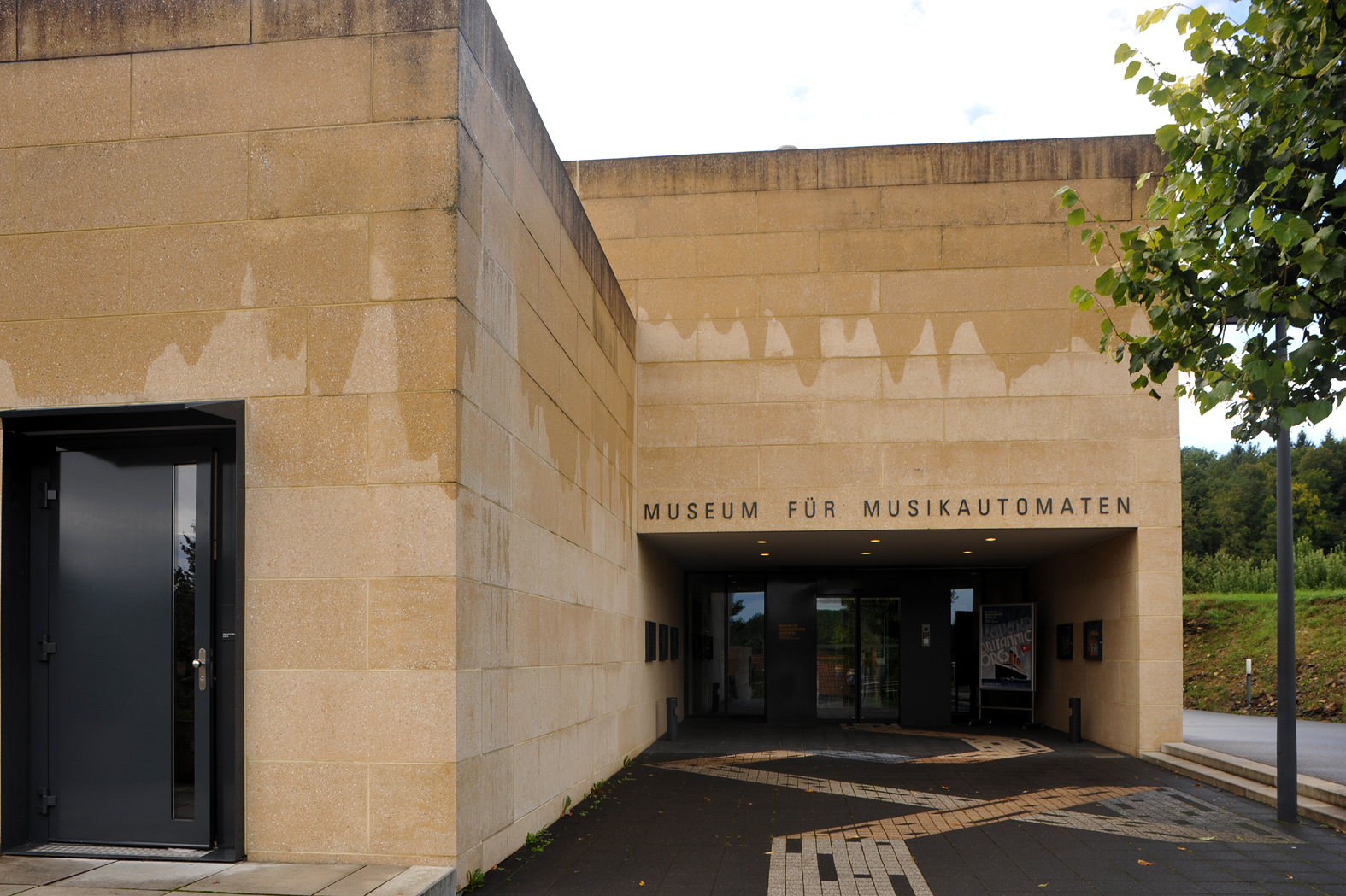
Museum für Musikautomaten

The Museum für Musikautomaten, a museum of music automatons such as player pianos, mechanical organs and other self-playing music instruments, is listed as a Swiss heritage site of national significance. It is a Swiss federal museum and has one of the world's largest collections of its kind. Among its exhibits is a Welte Philharmonic Organ built for the HMHS Britannic but not installed on the ship due to the outbreak of the First World War.

The entire village of Seewen is part of the Inventory of Swiss Heritage Sites.

== Politics ==
In the 2007 federal election the most popular party was the SVP which received 30.45% of the vote. The next three most popular parties were the FDP (26.21%), the CVP (22.89%) and the SP (13.32%). In the federal election, a total of 420 votes were cast, and the voter turnout was 54.8%.

== Economy ==
As of 2010, Seewen had an unemployment rate of 3.3%. As of 2008, there were 73 people employed in the primary economic sector and about 31 businesses involved in this sector. 53 people were employed in the secondary sector and there were 14 businesses in this sector. 67 people were employed in the tertiary sector, with 20 businesses in this sector. There were 501 residents of the municipality who were employed in some capacity, of which females made up 41.5% of the workforce.

In 2008 the total number of full-time equivalent jobs was 131. The number of jobs in the primary sector was 43, of which 38 were in agriculture and 5 were in forestry or lumber production. The number of jobs in the secondary sector was 48 of which 24 or (50.0%) were in manufacturing and 24 (50.0%) were in construction. The number of jobs in the tertiary sector was 40. In the tertiary sector; 7 or 17.5% were in wholesale or retail sales or the repair of motor vehicles, 5 or 12.5% were in the movement and storage of goods, 5 or 12.5% were in a hotel or restaurant, 4 or 10.0% were technical professionals or scientists, 5 or 12.5% were in education.

In 2000, there were 75 workers who commuted into the municipality and 355 workers who commuted away. The municipality is a net exporter of workers, with about 4.7 workers leaving the municipality for every one entering. About 6.7% of the workforce coming into Seewen are coming from outside Switzerland. Of the working population, 14.6% used public transportation to get to work, and 61.3% used a private car.

== Religion ==
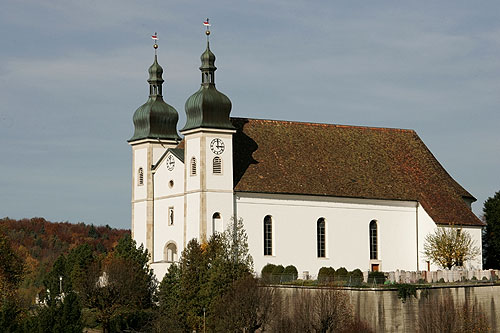
Church in Seewen

From the 2000 census, 564 or 58.9% were Roman Catholic, while 195 or 20.4% belonged to the Swiss Reformed Church. Of the rest of the population, there were 9 members of an Orthodox church (or about 0.94% of the population), there were 4 individuals (or about 0.42% of the population) who belonged to the Christian Catholic Church, and there were 12 individuals (or about 1.25% of the population) who belonged to another Christian church. From 2013 There are 4 individuals who are Mormon. There was 1 individual who was Jewish, and 9 (or about 0.94% of the population) who were Islamic. There were 2 individuals who were Buddhist. 122 (or about 12.73% of the population) belonged to no church, are agnostic or atheist, and 40 individuals (or about 4.18% of the population) did not answer the question.

== Education ==
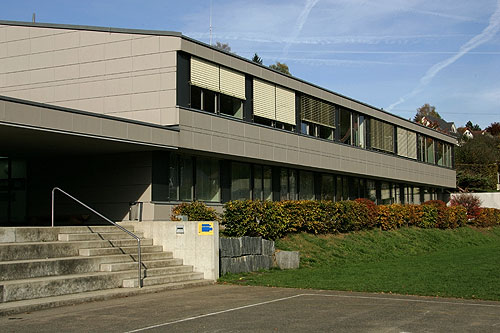
School building in Seewen

In Seewen about 384 or (40.1%) of the population have completed non-mandatory upper secondary education, and 89 or (9.2%) have completed additional higher education (either university or a Fachhochschule). Of the 88 who completed tertiary schooling, 67.0% were Swiss men, 20.5% were Swiss women, 10.2% were non-Swiss men.

During the 2010–2011 school year there were a total of 84 students in the Seewen school system. The education system in the Canton of Solothurn allows young children to attend two years of non-obligatory Kindergarten. During that school year, there were 16 children in kindergarten. The canton's school system requires students to attend six years of primary school, with some of the children attending smaller, specialized classes. In the municipality there were 68 students in primary school. The secondary school program consists of three lower, obligatory years of schooling, followed by three to five years of optional, advanced schools. All the lower secondary students from Seewen attend their school in a neighboring municipality.

As of 2000, there were two students in Seewen who came from another municipality, while 65 residents attended schools outside the municipality.

Seewen is home to the Schul- und Gemeindebibliothek Seewen (municipal library of Seewen).
