= Angenstein Castle =

Castle in Duggingen, Switzerland

- Duggingen
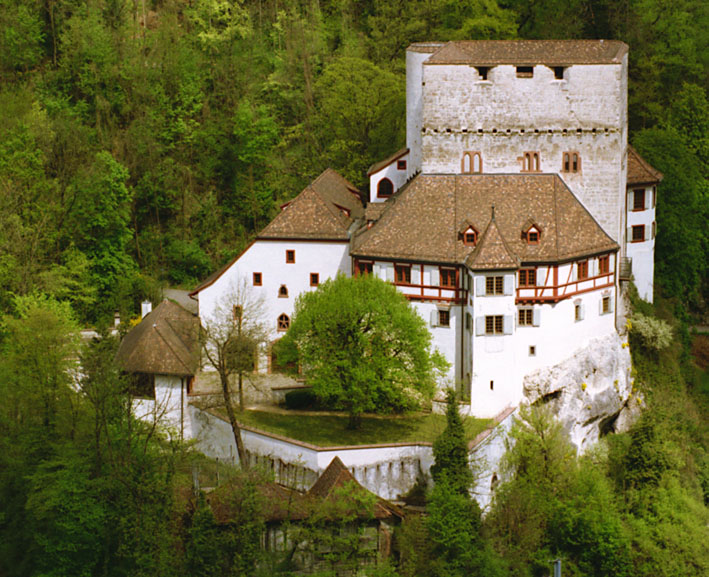
- Angenstein Castle from the south-west

Site information
- Code: CH-BL
- Condition: Partially habitable

Location
- Coordinates: 47°27′47.89″N 7°36′17.3″E
- Height: 315 m

Site history
- Built: Mid 13th century

Angenstein Castle (German: Schloss Angenstein or simply Angenstein) is a castle in the municipality of Duggingen in the canton of Basel-Land in Switzerland. It is a Swiss heritage site of national significance. The Jura Railway passes through a tunnel under Angenstein Castle on its route between Basel and Delémont. A Scoutsgroup and few other organisations and companies are named after the castle.

== See also ==
- List of castles in Switzerland
