= Aesch, Basel-Landschaft =

Aesch
- Municipality
- Coat of arms
- Location of Aesch
- Location within Switzerland Location within Canton of Basel-Landschaft
- Coordinates: 47°28′N 7°35′E
- Country: Switzerland
- Canton: Basel-Landschaft
- District: Arlesheim

Government
  - Executive: Gemeinderat with 7 members
  - Mayor: Eveline Sprecher SPS/PSS
  - Parliament: none (Gemeindeversammlung)

Area
  - Total: 7.39 km^{2} (2.85 sq mi)
- Elevation (Haupt-/ Ettingerstrasse): 315 m (1,033 ft)

Population (June 2021)
  - Total: 10,368
  - Density: 1,400/km^{2} (3,630/sq mi)
- Demonym: German: Aescher(in)
- Time zone: UTC+01:00 (CET)
  - Summer (DST): UTC+02:00 (CEST)
- Postal code: 4147
- SFOS number: 2761
- ISO 3166 code: CH-BL
- Surrounded by: Dornach (SO), Duggingen, Ettingen, Pfeffingen, Reinach, Therwil
- Website: www.aesch.bl.ch

Aesch (sometimes written as Aesch BL in order to distinguish it from other "Aesches"; Swiss German: Ääsch) is a town and a municipality in the canton of Basel-Landschaft, Switzerland. Almost all of its area is located on the left, western bank of the Birs and is a suburb of Basel.

The Neolithic gravesite in the Gmeiniwald is listed as a heritage site of national significance.

== History ==
Aesch is first mentioned in 1252 as Esch.

=== Prehistoric Aesch ===
The area around Aesch was inhabited as far back as the Upper Paleolithic, as the graves at Gmeiniwald show. The Dolmen graves of the A-Schwörstadt type date from about the 3rd millennium BC. Gmeiniwald was discovered in 1907, and excavated in 1907 and again in 1909. A central, rectangular grave chamber of 2.4 by 4.1 meters (7.9 ft × 13.5 ft) was found under a shallow mound of about 9 m (30 ft) in diameter. The grave contained the skeletal remains of 47 individuals, including 14 children, as well as evidence of cremation burials. The grave also contained arrows, spears and flint knives, animal tooth pendants, a mallet made of red sandstone and quartzite, and pottery fragments.

In 1977, along the Fluhstrasse, the remains of a middle Bronze Age settlement were discovered. The settlement dates from 1500 to 1300 BC and includes a fireplace and stone settings, the foundation of a 2.7 by 3.1 meters (8.9 ft × 10.2 ft) house, and pot shards. In Känelacker in 1923, a shop used for casting bronze from about 1300 BC was discovered. The site included copper cake and bronze fragments, including two medium-sized winged axes and various partially decorated plates and sickles. Late Bronze Age artifacts and pottery from 1300 to 800 BC were found at the old tram depot on the main road and along the road to Lerch.

=== Roman era and middle ages ===
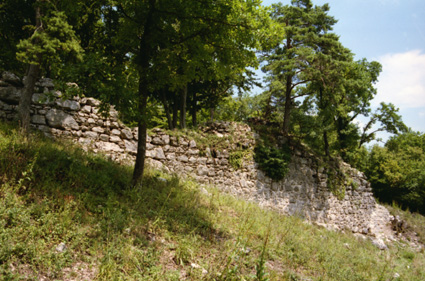
Ruins of Frohberg Castle

During the Roman era there were three Roman estates from the 1st-4th Century, and traces of their viticulture have been found near the modern town of Aesch. During the Early Middle Ages, cemeteries were located in Steinacker (7th Century) and in Saalbünten (now part of the church, probably from the 8th-10th Centuries). These finds cast doubt on the traditional idea that Aesch grew out of the 12th Century church farm that belonged to the church of Pfeffingen. Frohberg Castle was first mentioned in 1292, but by 1356 was in decline.

=== Early modern era ===
This area was part of the bishop's bailiwick of Pfeffingen from the 13th Century until 1519, when it was inherited by the Count of Thierstein. It was owned by that family until 1792. During that time, it was administered by the landvogt of Pfeffingen. Between 1583 and 1792, the landvogt's office was held by the Blarer family. In 1566, the bishop built a brick barn and in 1611 the bishop had a new wine-press built.

In 1702, Aesch became the bailiwick seat, and the bailiff moved into Blarer Castle, which had been built in 1604–07. After the construction of the Angensteiner bridge, Aesch became a customs station. The Customs House at the "Mugge" was built in 1715.

The inhabitants of this area were part of the parish of Pfeffingen. In 1672 the Blarer family donated a chapel (dedicated to St. Joseph) to the village. In the Late Middle Ages there was a nunnery along the Klus, however there are scant written records or archeological evidence of the building. The residents of Aesch, like the rest of the bailiwick of Pfeffingen, did not hold citizens' rights in the city of Basel. However, in 1529 they converted to the Protestant Reformation along with Basel. Between 1582 and 1588, the village stood in the center of the last successful Counter-Reformation efforts of the Bishop of Basel, Jacob Christoph Blarer of Wartensee. Due to its border location, Aesch suffered repeated looting and pillaging, during the Thirty Years War (1618–48) and other religious conflicts of this era. Due to the repeated attacks, very few buildings from before the 17th Century survived.

The farming village was dominated by vineyards, due to fertile soils, mild climate and sunny slopes. In 1745 there were six coopers (barrel makers) living in the village and the village farmers and rural poor were hired by the village farmers.

After the short-lived Rauracian Republic (1792–93), the village was under French rule from 1793 to 1815. Between 1793 and 1800 it was part of the Département of Mont-Terrible and then in 1800-1815 it was part of the Département of Haut-Rhin. As part of Haut-Rhin, it became a separate parish in 1803. The parish church of St. Joseph was built in 1819-20 and rebuilt in 1938–39. In 1815, the entire Birseck region, including Aesch, was awarded to the Canton of Basel. During the revolutions of 1830, revolutionary political leaders, including Anton von Blarer, rose to prominence in Aesch. In late 1830, a liberty pole with the slogan "Freedom or death" was erected in Aesch.

=== Modern Aesch ===
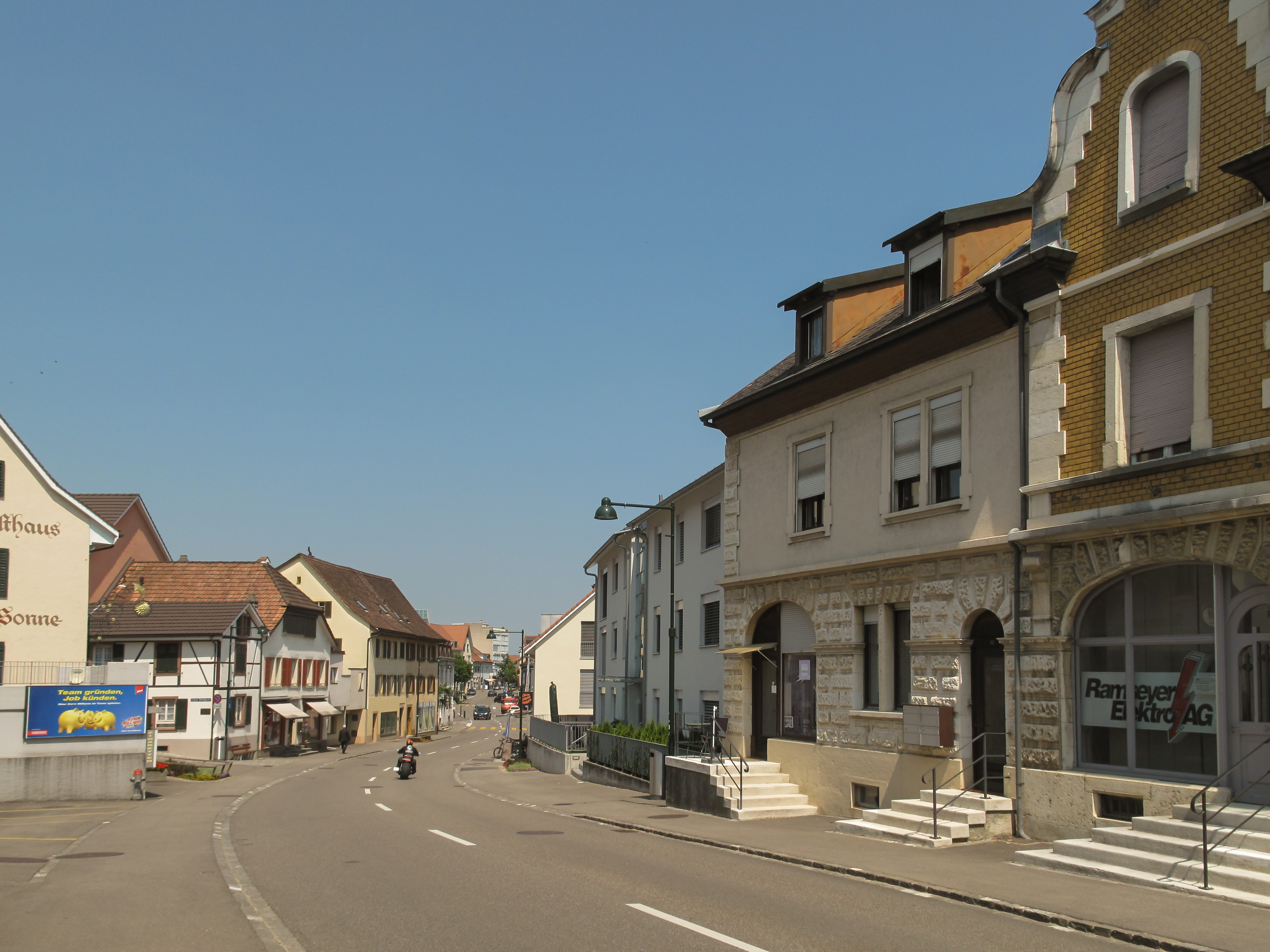
Aesch, view to a street

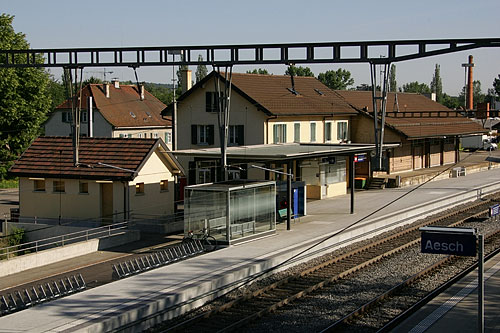
Aesch train station

Until the 20th Century Aesch retained its predominantly agricultural character even though some companies moved in. These companies included the Stoecklin rope factory (1865) and the Vogel fabricated metal products factory (1876). The number of acres under cultivation as vineyards dropped sharply during the late 19th Century. In 1846 there were 34 hectares (84 acres), while in 1906 it had dropped to 16 hectares (40 acres). The local farmers fought back with phylloxera eradication and a wine cooperative, so that Aesch now has the largest proportion of vineyards in Basel-Country. In 1985 there were 23 hectares (57 acres) of vineyards under cultivation.

Despite the accessibility of the Jura Bahn railway from Basel to Delémont (built in 1875) and the tram line Basel-Aesch (in 1907), very few industrial and commercial companies moved into Aesch until after World War II. In the post-war years, companies in the metal processing, mechanical engineering and pharmaceutical industry settled in the new industrial zones. The correction of the river Birs in 1970 opened up further industrial land. The number of farms decreased from 88 (1929) to 21 (1980) to 16 (1999). Strong population growth has led to brisk construction activity, including the entirely new settlement of Neu-Aesch which was built in 1987. In 1990, 54% of the jobs were in the services sector, and 74% of workers were commuters. In 1851, Blarer Castle was bought by the municipality and converted into a school house. It was auctioned off and renovated in 1959 into a modern office building.

== Geography ==
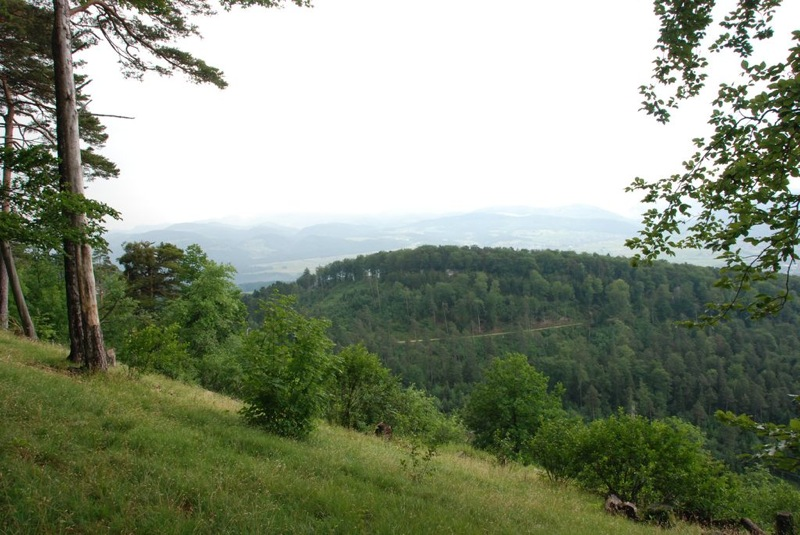
Hills around Aesch

Aerial view from 500 m by Walter Mittelholzer (1922)

Aesch has an area, as of 2009, of 7.39 square kilometers (2.85 sq mi). Of this area, 3.47 km^{2} (1.34 sq mi) or 47.0% is used for agricultural purposes, while 1.21 km^{2} (0.47 sq mi) or 16.4% is forested. Of the remainder, 2.66 km^{2} (1.03 sq mi) or 36.0% is settled (buildings or roads), 0.05 km^{2} (12 acres) or 0.7% is either rivers or lakes and 0.01 km^{2} (2.5 acres) or 0.1% is unproductive land.

Of the built-up area, industrial buildings made up 5.4% of the total area while housing and buildings made up 18.3% and transportation infrastructure made up 8.4%. Power and water infrastructure as well as other special developed areas made up 1.1% of the area while parks, green belts and sports fields made up 2.8%. Of the forested land, 14.7% of the total land area is heavily forested and 1.6% is covered with orchards or small clusters of trees. Of the agricultural land, 31.4% is used for growing crops and 8.7% is pastures, while 6.9% is used for orchards or vine crops. All the water in the municipality is flowing water.

The municipality is located in the Arlesheim district, almost exclusively on the left bank of the Birs. Today, it is part of the agglomeration of Basel. It consists of the linear village of Aesch along the road between Birseck and the Laufen valley.

== Coat of arms ==
The blazon of the municipal coat of arms is Argent, a Spear-point Sable bendwise, in chef sinister a Mullet (of Six) Gules.

== Demographics ==
Aesch has a population (as of June 2021) of 10,368. As of 2008, 22.0% of the population are resident foreign nationals. Over the last 10 years (1997–2007) the population has changed at a rate of 0.8%.

Most of the population (as of 2000) speaks German (8,258 or 84.8%), with Italian language second (540 or 5.5%), and French third (139 or 1.4%). There are 9 people who speak Romansh.

As of 2008, the gender distribution of the population was 49.4% male and 50.6% female. The population was composed of 7,863 Swiss citizens (76.8% of the population), and 2,372 non-Swiss residents (23.2%). Of the population in the municipality 2,303 or about 23.7% were born in Aesch and lived there in 2000. There were 1,615 or 16.6% who were born in the same canton, while 3,522 or 36.2% were born somewhere else in Switzerland, and 2,036 or 20.9% were born outside of Switzerland.

In 2008 there were 55 live births to Swiss citizens and 23 births to non-Swiss citizens, and in the same time span there were 80 deaths of Swiss citizens and 10 non-Swiss citizen deaths. Ignoring immigration and emigration, the population of Swiss citizens decreased by 25 while the foreign population increased by 13. There were 4 Swiss men who immigrated back to Switzerland and 3 Swiss women who emigrated from Switzerland. At the same time, there were 43 non-Swiss men and 33 non-Swiss women who immigrated from another country to Switzerland. The total Swiss population change in 2008 (from all sources, including moves across municipal borders) was an increase of 27 and the non-Swiss population change was an increase of 62 people. This represents a population growth rate of 0.9%.

The age distribution, as of 2010, in Aesch is; 668 or 6.5% of the population are between 0 and 6 years old (children), and 1,428 or 14.0% are between 7 and 19 (teenagers). Of the adult population, 1,207 people or 11.8% of the population are between 20 and 29 years old. 1,320 people or 12.9% are between 30 and 39, 1,722 people or 16.8% are between 40 and 49, and 2,144 people or 20.9% are between 50 and 64. The senior population distribution is 1,319 people or 12.9% of the population are between 65 and 79 years old and there are 427 people or 4.2% who are over 80.

As of 2000, there were 3,831 people who were single and never married in the municipality. There were 4,953 married individuals, 441 widows or widowers and 510 individuals who are divorced.

As of 2000, there were 4,079 private households in the municipality, and an average of 2.3 persons per household. There were 1,188 households that consist of only one person and 198 households with five or more people. Out of a total of 4,148 households that answered this question, 28.6% were households made up of just one person and 25 were adults who lived with their parents. Of the rest of the households, there are 1,245 married couples without children, 1,296 married couples with children. There were 266 single parents with a child or children. There were 59 households that were made up unrelated people and 69 households that were made some sort of institution or another collective housing.

In 2000 there were 1,291 single-family homes (or 68.3% of the total) out of a total of 1,891 inhabited buildings. There were 360 multi-family buildings (19.0%), along with 155 multi-purpose buildings that were mostly used for housing (8.2%) and 85 other-use buildings (commercial or industrial) that also had some housing (4.5%). Of the single-family homes, 71 were built before 1919, while 87 were built between 1990 and 2000. The greatest number of single-family homes (313) were built between 1961 and 1970.

In 2000 there were 4,317 apartments in the municipality. The most common apartment size was 4 rooms of which there were 1,500. There were 154 single-room apartments and 1,185 apartments with five or more rooms. Of these apartments, a total of 4,001 apartments (92.7% of the total) were permanently occupied, while 226 apartments (5.2%) were seasonally occupied and 90 apartments (2.1%) were empty.As of 2007, the construction rate of new housing units was 2.6 new units per 1000 residents. As of 2000 the average price to rent a two-room apartment was about 898.00 CHF (US$720, £400, €570), a three-room apartment was about 1098.00 CHF (US$880, £490, €700) and a four-room apartment cost an average of 1407.00 CHF (US$1130, £630, €900). The vacancy rate for the municipality, in 2008, was 0.24%.

The historical population is given in the following chart:

== Heritage sites of national significance ==
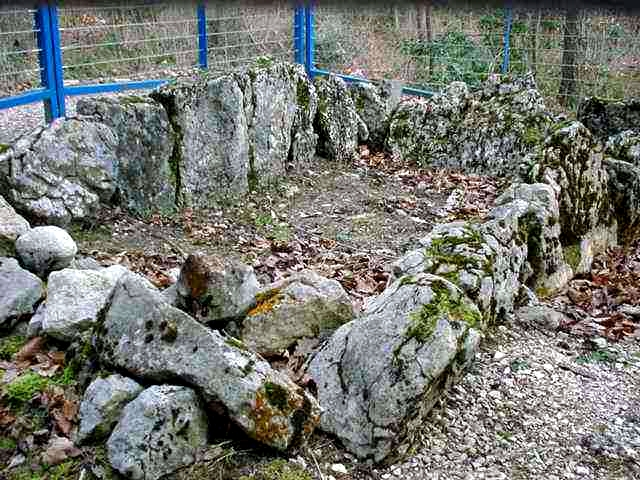
A dolmen grave at Gmeiniwald

The Gmeiniwald, a Neolithic dolmen grave, and the School Complex of Neumatt are listed as Swiss heritage sites of national significance.

== Politics ==
In the 2007 federal election, the most popular party was the SVP which received 26.92% of the vote. The next three most popular parties were the SP (26.76%), the CVP (17.24%) and the FDP (14.54%). In the federal election, a total of 2,884 votes were cast, and the voter turnout was 44.2%.

== Economy ==
As of 2007, Aesch had an unemployment rate of 2.48%. As of 2005, there were 98 people employed in the primary economic sector and about 21 businesses involved in this sector. 2,127 people were employed in the secondary sector and there were 97 businesses in this sector. 1,872 people were employed in the tertiary sector, with 289 businesses in this sector. There were 5,182 residents of the municipality who were employed in some capacity, of which females made up 44.3% of the workforce.

In 2008 the total number of full-time equivalent jobs was 3,941. The number of jobs in the primary sector was 52, of which 39 were in agriculture and 13 were in forestry or lumber production. The number of jobs in the secondary sector was 2,429, of which 1,964 or (80.9%) were in manufacturing and 465 (19.1%) were in construction. The number of jobs in the tertiary sector was 1,460. In the tertiary sector; 411 or 28.2% were in wholesale or retail sales or the repair of motor vehicles, 118 or 8.1% were in the movement and storage of goods, 84 or 5.8% were in a hotel or restaurant, 67 or 4.6% were in the information industry, 130 or 8.9% were the insurance or financial industry, 134 or 9.2% were technical professionals or scientists, 100 or 6.8% were in education and 171 or 11.7% were in health care.

In 2000, there were 4,206 workers who commuted into the municipality and 3,953 workers who commuted away. The municipality is a net importer of workers, with about 1.1 workers entering the municipality for every one leaving. About 19.6% of the workforce coming into Aesch are coming from outside Switzerland, while 0.2% of the locals commute out of Switzerland for work. Of the working population, 28.2% used public transportation to get to work, and 42.8% used a private car.

== Religion ==
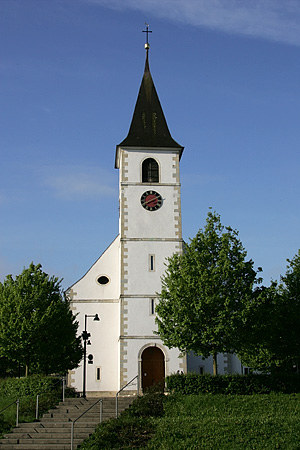
Church in Aesch

From the 2000 census, 4,294 or 44.1% were Roman Catholic, while 2,723 or 28.0% belonged to the Swiss Reformed Church. Of the rest of the population, there were 187 members of an Orthodox church (or about 1.92% of the population), there were 20 individuals (or about 0.21% of the population) who belonged to the Christian Catholic Church, and there were 216 individuals (or about 2.22% of the population) who belonged to another Christian church. There were 3 individuals (or about 0.03% of the population) who were Jewish, and 496 (or about 5.10% of the population) who were Islamic. There were 28 individuals who were Buddhist, 59 individuals who were Hindu and 5 individuals who belonged to another church. 1,458 (or about 14.98% of the population) belonged to no church, are agnostic or atheist, and 246 individuals (or about 2.53% of the population) did not answer the question.

== Transport ==
Aesch sits on the Basel–Biel/Bienne line and is served by local trains at Aesch. It is also served by Line 11 of the Basel tramway network.

== Education ==
In Aesch about 4,031 or (41.4%) of the population have completed non-mandatory upper secondary education, and 1,369 or (14.1%) have completed additional higher education (either university or a Fachhochschule). Of the 1,369 who completed tertiary schooling, 62.2% were Swiss men, 21.7% were Swiss women, 10.4% were non-Swiss men and 5.7% were non-Swiss women. As of 2000, there were 158 students in Aesch who came from another municipality, while 370 residents attended schools outside the municipality.

The International School Basel maintains its Aesch Campus here.

== Notable people ==
- Alfred Vogel (1902 in Aesch BL – 1996) a Swiss phytotherapist, nutritionist and writer.
- Petra Sprecher (born 1973) a Swiss circus artist, stuntwoman and actress residing in Los Angeles, brought up in Aesch
