= Laufen railway station =

Railway station in Switzerland

Laufen
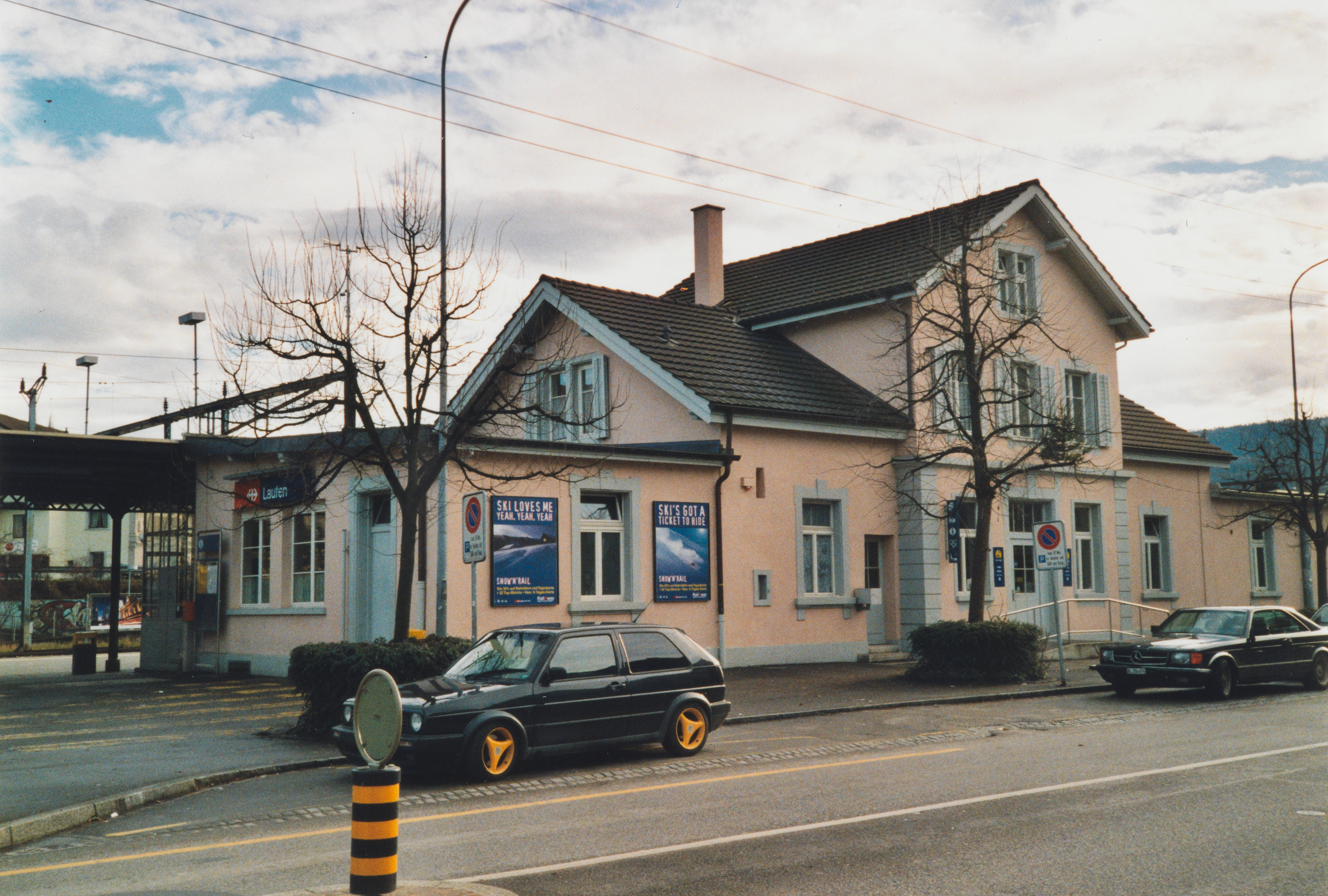
- The station building in 2001

General information
- Location: Laufen; Switzerland
- Coordinates: 47°25′08″N 7°30′11″E
- Owner: Swiss Federal Railways
- Line: Basel–Biel/Bienne line
- Train operators: BLS AG; Swiss Federal Railways

Services
Preceding station	SBB CFF FFS	Following station
Delémont towards Lausanne	IC 51	Basel SBB Terminus
Preceding station	BLS	Following station
Delémont towards Biel/Bienne	IR 56	Basel SBB Terminus
Preceding station	Basel S-Bahn	Following station
Delémont Terminus	S3 Limited service	Zwingen towards Olten
Terminus	S3	Zwingen towards Olten
Terminus	S31	Zwingen towards Basel SBB
Location
- Location within Switzerland

Laufen railway station (French: Gare de Laufon) is a railway station in the municipality of Laufen, in the Swiss canton of Basel-Landschaft. It is an intermediate stop on the Basel–Biel/Bienne line and is served by local and long-distance trains.

== Services ==
As of the December 2025 timetable change, the following services stop at Laufen:

- InterCity / InterRegio: half-hourly service between Biel/Bienne and Basel SBB and hourly service to Lausanne.
- Basel S-Bahn /: half-hourly service to Olten with additional peak-hour service to Basel SBB and two trains per day to Delémont.
