= Val Terbi =

- Municipality
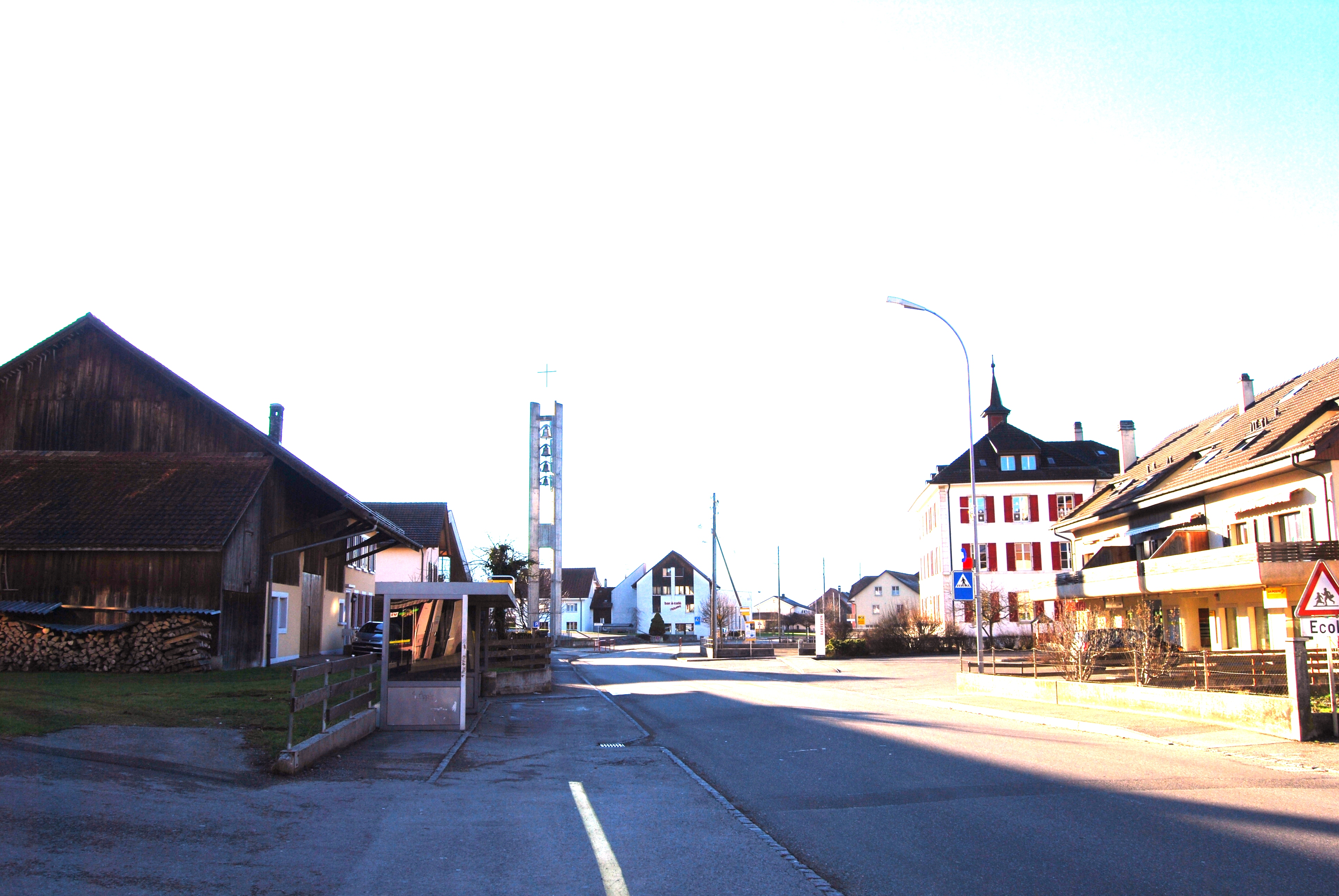
- Vicques village
- Location of Val Terbi
- Location within Switzerland Location within Canton of Jura
- Coordinates: 47°21′N 07°25′E
- Country: Switzerland
- Canton: Jura
- District: Delémont

Government
  - Executive: Conseil communal with 7 members
  - Mayor: Maire; Claude-Alain Chapatte (as of 2026)
  - Parliament: Conseil général with 23 members

Area
  - Total: 38.86 km^{2} (15.00 sq mi)

Population (Dec 2011)
  - Total: 2,592
  - Density: 66.70/km^{2} (172.8/sq mi)
- Time zone: UTC+01:00 (CET)
  - Summer (DST): UTC+02:00 (CEST)
- Postal code: 2824/2828/2829
- SFOS number: 6730
- ISO 3166 code: CH-JU
- Localities: Recolaine
- Surrounded by: Courchapoix, Rebeuvelier, Courroux, Bärschwil(SO), Mervelier, Corban, Grindel(SO), Erschwil(SO), Beinwil(SO), Courchapoix, Schelten(BE), Elay(BE), Corcelles(BE), Crémines(BE)
- Website: www.val-terbi.ch/

Val Terbi (French pronunciation: [val tɛʁbi]) is a municipality in the district of Delémont in the canton of Jura in Switzerland. The municipalities of Montsevelier, Vermes and Vicques merged on 1 January 2013 into the new municipality of Val Terbi. On 1 January 2018 the former municipality of Corban merged into the municipality of Val Terbi.

== History ==
Montsevelier is first mentioned in 1136 as Muzivilir. The municipality was formerly known by its German name Mutzwil, however, that name is no longer used Vermes is first mentioned in 866 as Vertima. In 1308 it was mentioned as Vermunt. Vicques is first mentioned in 866 as Vicum.

== Geography ==
Val Terbi has an area, (as of the 2004/09 survey) of 38.84 km^{2} (15.00 sq mi). Of this area, about 43.5% is used for agricultural purposes, while 51.1% is forested. Of the rest of the land, 4.9% is settled (buildings or roads) and 0.6% is unproductive land. In the 2013/18 survey a total of 131 ha (320 acres) or about 3.4% of the total area was covered with buildings, an increase of 50 ha (120 acres) over the 1982 amount. Of the agricultural land, 25 ha (62 acres) is used for orchards and vineyards, 1,229 ha (3,040 acres) is fields and grasslands and 515 ha (1,270 acres) consists of alpine grazing areas. Since 1982 the amount of agricultural land has decreased by 44 ha (110 acres). Over the same time period the amount of forested land has decreased by 19 ha (47 acres). Rivers and lakes cover 33 ha (82 acres) in the municipality.

The municipality of Corban chose to merge into Val Terbi on 1 January 2018.

== Demographics ==
Val Terbi has a population (as of December 2020) of 8,651. As of 2015, 7.3% of the population are resident foreign nationals. Over the last 5 years (2010-2015) the population has changed at a rate of 2.62%. The birth rate in the municipality, in 2015, was 7.2, while the death rate was 8.0 per thousand residents.

As of 2015, children and teenagers (0–19 years old) make up 23.9% of the population, while adults (20–64 years old) are 58.3% of the population and seniors (over 64 years old) make up 17.7%. In 2015 there were 1,115 single residents, 1,186 people who were married or in a civil partnership, 148 widows or widowers and 177 divorced residents.

In 2015 there were 1,029 private households in Val Terbi with an average household size of 2.53 persons. In 2015 about 68.4% of all buildings in the municipality were single family homes, which is about the same as the percentage in the canton (66.9%) and greater than the percentage nationally (57.4%). In 2014 the rate of construction of new housing units per 1000 residents was 2.65. The vacancy rate for the municipality, in 2016, was 0.72%.

== Historic Population ==
The historical population is given in the following chart:

== Sights ==
The entire village of Corban is designated as part of the Inventory of Swiss Heritage Sites.

== Economy ==
Val Terbi is classed as a mixed agro-industrial community, a municipality where agriculture and manufacturing play a significant role in the economy. The municipality is part of the agglomeration of Delémont.

As of 2014, there were a total of 883 people employed in the municipality. Of these, a total of 140 people worked in 49 businesses in the primary economic sector. The secondary sector employed 297 workers in 45 separate businesses of which there were 4 small businesses with a total of 85 employees and one mid sized business also with 85 employees. Finally, the tertiary sector provided 446 jobs in 106 businesses.

In 2015 a total of 2.7% of the population received social assistance.

In 2015 the average cantonal, municipal and church tax rate in the municipality for a couple with two children making SFr 80,000 was 6.4% while the rate for a single person making SFr 150,000 was 21.2%. The canton has a slightly higher than average tax rate for those making SFr 80,000 and a slightly higher than average rate for those making SFr 150,000. In 2013 the average income in the municipality per tax payer was SFr 66,064 and the per person average was SFr 25,115, which is less than the cantonal average of SFr 66,925 and SFr 26,992 respectively It is also less than the national per tax payer average of SFr 82,682 and the per person average of SFr 35,825.

== Politics ==
In the 2015 federal election the most popular party was the SP with 24.7% of the vote. The next three most popular parties were the CVP (23.6%), the CSP (17.1%) and the SVP (17.1%). In the federal election, a total of 936 votes were cast, and the voter turnout was 47.5%.

== Crime ==
In 2014 the crime rate, of the over 200 crimes listed in the Swiss Criminal Code (running from murder, robbery and assault to accepting bribes and election fraud), in Val Terbi was 31.3 per thousand residents. This rate is only 62.4% of the cantonal rate and 48.5% of the average rate in the entire country. During the same period no crimes or violations of immigration, visa or work permit laws have been perpetrated.
