= Athletics at the 1960 Summer Olympics – Men's 20 kilometres walk =

Men's 20 kilometre walk at the Games of the XVII Olympiad
- Venue: Olympic Stadium
- Dates: September 2, 1960
- Competitors: 36 from 18 nations
- Winning time: 1:34:07.2

Medalists
1st place, gold medalist(s)		Vladimir Golubnichy; Soviet Union
2nd place, silver medalist(s)		Noel Freeman; Australia
3rd place, bronze medalist(s)		Stan Vickers; Great Britain

The men's 20 kilometres walk race walk event at the 1960 Olympic Games took place on September 2. The event was held in a final only format.

== Results ==
Rank	Athlete	Nation	Time	Time behind	Notes
1st place, gold medalist(s)	Volodymyr Holubnychy	Soviet Union	1:34:07.2		
2nd place, silver medalist(s)	Noel Freeman	Australia	1:34:16.4		
3rd place, bronze medalist(s)	Stan Vickers	Great Britain	1:34:56.4		
4	Dieter Lindner	United Team of Germany	1:35:33.8		
5	Norman Read	New Zealand	1:36:59.0		
6	Lennart Back	Sweden	1:37:17.0		
7	John Ljunggren	Sweden	1:37:59.0		
8	Ladislav Moc	Czechoslovakia	1:38:32.4		
9	Alex Oakley	Canada	1:38:46.0		
10	Eric Hall	Great Britain	1:38:54.0		
11	Ronald Crawford	Australia	1:39:16.2		
12	Henri Delerue	France	1:39:37.6		
13	George Hazle	South Africa	1:40:16.2		
14	Lennart Carlsson	Sweden	1:40:25.0		
15	Tommy Kristensen	Denmark	1:41:07.6		
16	Hannes Koch	United Team of Germany	1:41:53.4		
17	Louis Marquis	Switzerland	1:41:59.6		
18	Charles Sowa	Luxembourg	1:42:43.8		
19	Ron Zinn	United States	1:42:47.0		
20	Zora Singh	India	1:43:19.8		
21	Stefano Serchinich	Italy	1:43:58.6		
22	Luigi De Rosso	Italy	1:45:04.2		
23	Bob Mimm	United States	1:45:09.0		
24	Rudy Haluza	United States	1:45:11.0		
25	Leo Rosschou	Denmark	1:46:35.8		
26	Gianni Corsaro	Italy	1:46:47.2		
27	Khalifa Bahrouni	Tunisia	1:47:09.6		
28	Naoui Zlassi	Tunisia	1:55:21.0		
—	Ajit Singh	India	DSQ		
—	Anatoly Vedyakov	Soviet Union	DSQ		
—	Mohamed Ben Lazhar	Tunisia	DSQ		
—	Gabriel Reymond	Switzerland	DSQ		
—	Gennady Solodov	Soviet Union	DSQ		
—	Siegfried Lefanczik	United Team of Germany	DSQ		
—	Tibor Balajcza	Hungary	DSQ		
—	Ken Matthews	Great Britain	DNF		
—	Eugen Filipescu	Romania	DNS		

Key: DQ = disqualified; DNF = did not finish
