= 1958 European Athletics Championships – Men's 20 kilometres walk =

Men's 20 kilometres walk at the European Athletics Championships

The men's 20 kilometres race walk at the 1958 European Athletics Championships was held in Stockholm, Sweden, on 19 August 1958.

== Medalists ==
Gold	Stanley Vickers; Great Britain
Silver	Leonid Spirin; Soviet Union
Bronze	Lennart Back; Sweden

== Results ==
=== Final ===
19 August

Rank	Name	Nationality	Time	Notes
1st place, gold medalist(s)	Stanley Vickers	Great Britain	1:33:09.0	CR
2nd place, silver medalist(s)	Leonid Spirin	Soviet Union	1:35:04.2	
3rd place, bronze medalist(s)	Lennart Back	Sweden	1:35:22.2	
4	Lennart Carlsson	Sweden	1:35:38.4	
5	Louis Marquis	Switzerland	1:35:59.4	
6	Giuseppe Dordoni	Italy	1:36:16.2	
7	Siegfried Lefanczik	East Germany	1:39:18.6	
8	Gabriel Reymond	Switzerland	1:39:18.6	
9	Franciszek Szyszka	Poland	1:39:44.0	
10	Georges Attane	France	1:40:34.6	
11	Albert Johnson	Great Britain	1:41:54.4	
12	Jerzy Hausleber	Poland	1:43:53.2	
	Dieter Lindner	East Germany	DQ	
	Bruno Junk	Soviet Union	DQ	

== Participation ==
According to an unofficial count, 14 athletes from 8 countries participated in the event.

- East Germany (2)
- France (1)
- Italy (1)
- Poland (2)
- Soviet Union (2)
- Sweden (2)
- Switzerland (2)
- Great Britain (2)
