= Corban, Switzerland =

Corban
- Former municipality
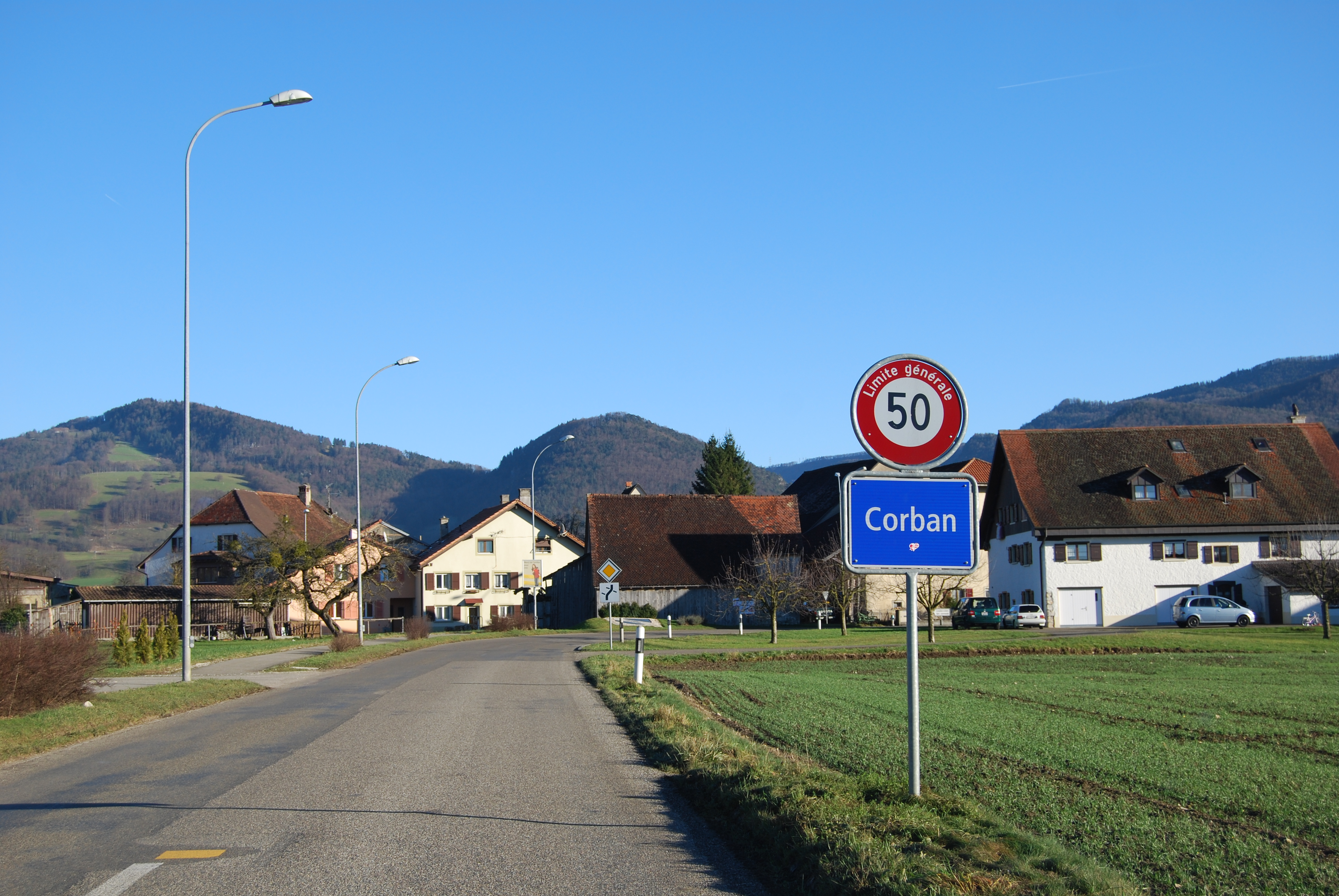
- Corban village

- Coat of arms
- Location of Corban
- Location within Switzerland Location within Canton of Jura
- Coordinates: 47°21′N 07°28′E
- Country: Switzerland
- Canton: Jura
- District: Delémont

Government
  - Mayor: Maire

Area
  - Total: 7.87 km^{2} (3.04 sq mi)
- Elevation: 525 m (1,722 ft)

Population (December 2005)
  - Total: 467
  - Density: 59.3/km^{2} (154/sq mi)
- Time zone: UTC+01:00 (CET)
  - Summer (DST): UTC+02:00 (CEST)
- Postal code: 2826
- SFOS number: 6705
- ISO 3166 code: CH-JU
- Surrounded by: Courchapoix, Vermes, Mervelier, Montsevelier, Bärschwil(SO)
- Website: SFSO statistics

Corban (French pronunciation: [kɔʁbɑ̃]) is a former municipality in the district of Delémont in the canton of Jura in Switzerland. On 1 January 2018 the former municipality of Corban merged into the municipality of Val Terbi.

== History ==
Corban is first mentioned in 1184 as Bathendorf. In 1240 it was mentioned as Corpaon.

== Geography ==
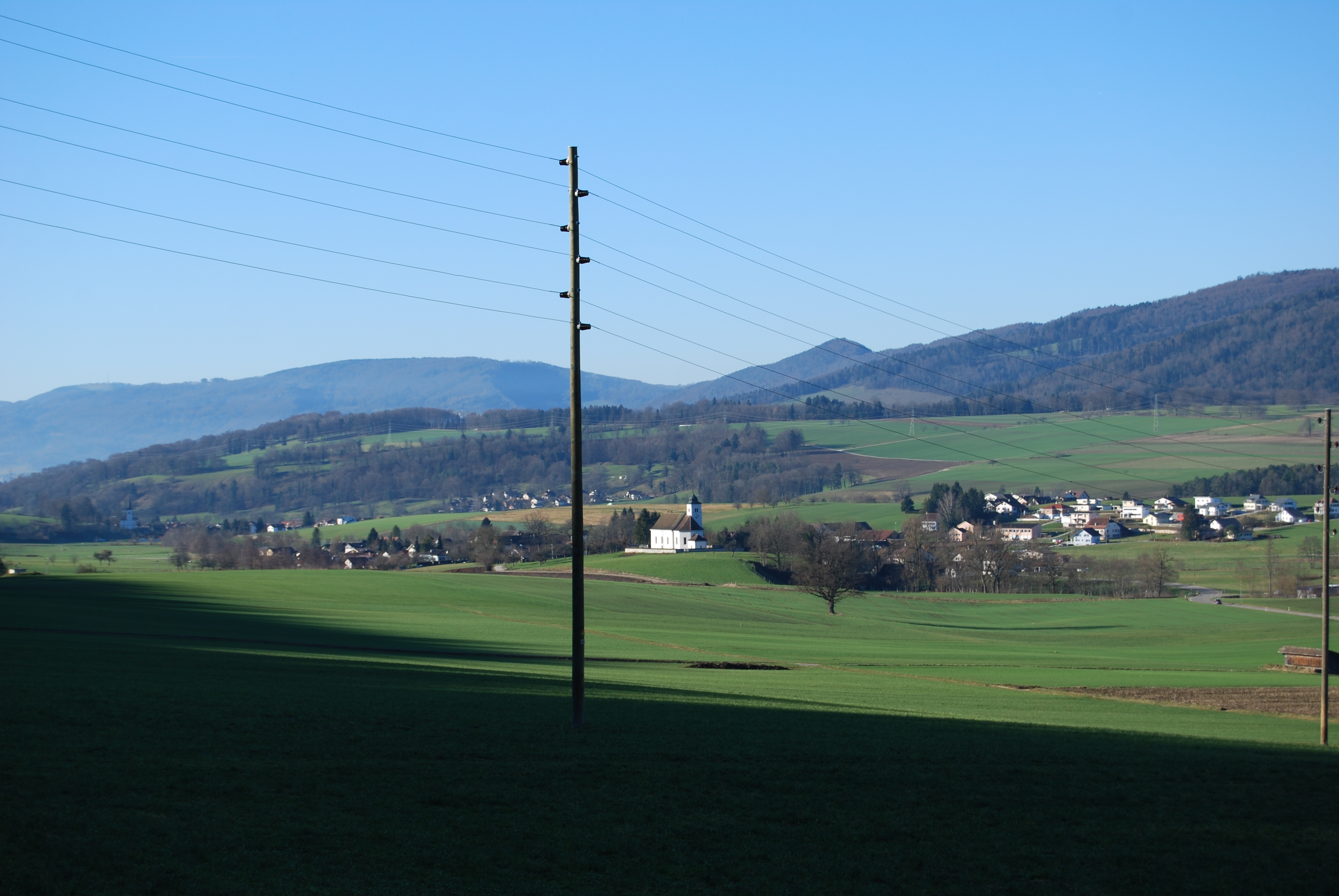
Corban

Aerial view (1950)

Corban has an area of 7.85 km^{2} (3.03 sq mi). Of this area, 4.91 km^{2} (1.90 mi^{2}) or 62.5% is used for agricultural purposes, while 2.6 km^{2} (1.0 mi^{2}) or 33.1% is forested. Of the rest of the land, 0.35 km^{2} (0.14 mi^{2}) or 4.5% is settled (buildings or roads), 0.01 km^{2} (2.5 acres) or 0.1% is either rivers or lakes and 0.02 km^{2} (4.9 acres) or 0.3% is unproductive land.

Of the built up area, housing and buildings made up 2.7% and transportation infrastructure made up 1.4%. Out of the forested land, 31.8% of the total land area is heavily forested and 1.3% is covered with orchards or small clusters of trees. Of the agricultural land, 40.0% is used for growing crops and 21.5% is pastures. All the water in the municipality is flowing water.

The municipality is located in the Delemont district, in the eastern part of the Val Terbi.

The municipalities of Corban, Courchapoix, Courroux, Mervelier, Montsevelier, Vermes and Vicques are considering a merger on at a date in the future into the new municipality of Val Terbi.

== Coat of arms ==
The blazon of the municipal coat of arms is Azure, a Bend Argent. In 2004, 2 caterpillars were re-added to the coat of arms.

== Demographics ==
Corban has a population (as of December 2020) of 465. As of 2008, 3.6% of the population are resident foreign nationals. Over the last 10 years (2000–2010) the population has changed at a rate of 1.5%. Migration accounted for 1.7%, while births and deaths accounted for 2.7%.

Most of the population (as of 2000) speaks French (424 or 93.8%) as their first language, German is the second most common (23 or 5.1%) and Italian is the third (2 or 0.4%).

As of 2008, the population was 50.6% male and 49.4% female. The population was made up of 238 Swiss men (49.2% of the population) and 7 (1.4%) non-Swiss men. There were 226 Swiss women (46.7%) and 13 (2.7%) non-Swiss women. Of the population in the municipality, 223 or about 49.3% were born in Corban and lived there in 2000. There were 153 or 33.8% who were born in the same canton, while 48 or 10.6% were born somewhere else in Switzerland, and 20 or 4.4% were born outside of Switzerland.

As of 2000, children and teenagers (0–19 years old) make up 29.2% of the population, while adults (20–64 years old) make up 56.6% and seniors (over 64 years old) make up 14.2%.

As of 2000, there were 192 people who were single and never married in the municipality. There were 232 married individuals, 22 widows or widowers and 6 individuals who are divorced.

As of 2000, there were 168 private households in the municipality, and an average of 2.6 persons per household. There were 38 households that consist of only one person and 17 households with five or more people. In 2000, a total of 158 apartments (91.3% of the total) were permanently occupied, while 8 apartments (4.6%) were seasonally occupied and 7 apartments (4.0%) were empty. As of 2009, the construction rate of new housing units was 2.1 new units per 1000 residents. The vacancy rate for the municipality, in 2010, was 2.67%.

The historical population is given in the following chart:

== Sights ==
The entire village of Corban is designated as part of the Inventory of Swiss Heritage Sites.

== Politics ==
In the 2007 federal election the most popular party was the SPS which received 39.02% of the vote. The next three most popular parties were the CVP (32.75%), the SVP (17.77%) and the FDP (5.92%). In the federal election, a total of 145 votes were cast, and the voter turnout was 40.1%.

== Economy ==
As of 2010, Corban had an unemployment rate of 3.3%. As of 2008, there were 29 people employed in the primary economic sector and about 12 businesses involved in this sector. 14 people were employed in the secondary sector and there were 5 businesses in this sector. 17 people were employed in the tertiary sector, with 4 businesses in this sector. There were 219 residents of the municipality who were employed in some capacity, of which females made up 37.4% of the workforce.

In 2008 the total number of full-time equivalent jobs was 50. The number of jobs in the primary sector was 25, all of which were in agriculture. The number of jobs in the secondary sector was 13 of which 1 was in manufacturing and 12 (92.3%) were in construction. The number of jobs in the tertiary sector was 12. In the tertiary sector; 1 was in the sale or repair of motor vehicles, 3 or 25.0% were in a hotel or restaurant, and 6 or 50.0% were in education.

In 2000, there were 10 workers who commuted into the municipality and 175 workers who commuted away. The municipality is a net exporter of workers, with about 17.5 workers leaving the municipality for every one entering. Of the working population, 14.6% used public transportation to get to work, and 67.6% used a private car.

== Religion ==
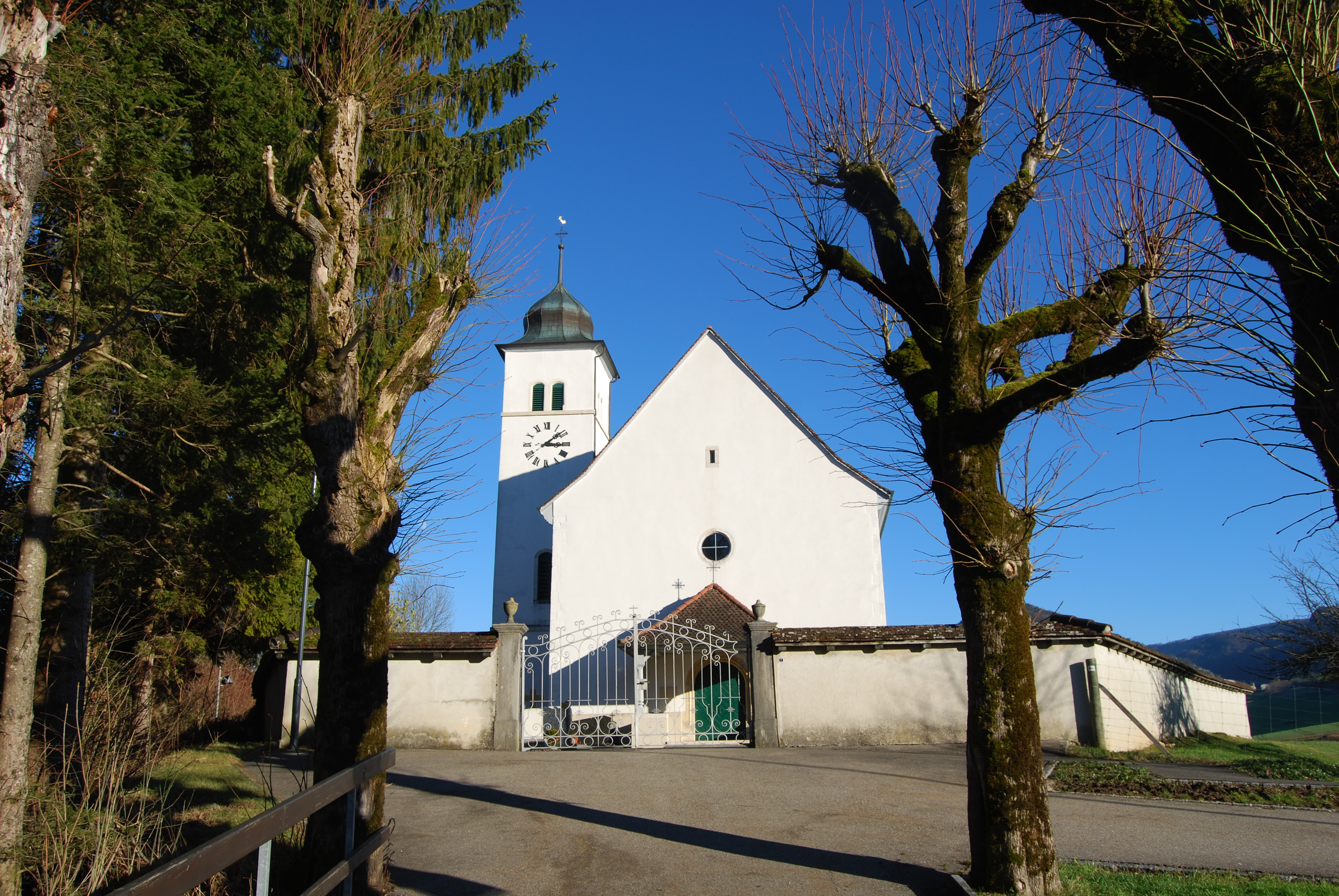
Corban church

From the 2000 census, 381 or 84.3% were Roman Catholic, while 39 or 8.6% belonged to the Swiss Reformed Church. Of the rest of the population, there was 1 individual who belongs to another Christian church. There were 5 (or about 1.11% of the population) who were Islamic. There was 1 person who was Buddhist. 18 (or about 3.98% of the population) belonged to no church, are agnostic or atheist, and 7 individuals (or about 1.55% of the population) did not answer the question.

== Education ==
In Corban about 157 or (34.7%) of the population have completed non-mandatory upper secondary education, and 26 or (5.8%) have completed additional higher education (either university or a Fachhochschule). Of the 26 who completed tertiary schooling, 73.1% were Swiss men, 26.9% were Swiss women.

The Canton of Jura school system provides two year of non-obligatory Kindergarten, followed by six years of Primary school. This is followed by three years of obligatory lower Secondary school where the students are separated according to ability and aptitude. Following the lower Secondary students may attend a three or four year optional upper Secondary school followed by some form of Tertiary school or they may enter an apprenticeship.

During the 2009-10 school year, there were a total of 45 students attending 4 classes in Corban. There was one kindergarten class with a total of 15 students in the municipality. The municipality had 2.5 primary classes and 30 students. There are only nine Secondary schools in the canton, so all the students from Corban attend their secondary school in another municipality.

As of 2000, there were 41 students from Corban who attended schools outside the municipality.
