= Lennart Carlsson =

Lennart Carlsson may refer to:

- Lennart Carlsson (racewalker)
- Lennart Carlsson (speed skater)
