= Haluza =

Haluza may refer to:

- Elusa (Haluza), an ancient city in southwest Asia
- Rudy Haluza (1931–2021), American racewalker
