= Leo Rosschou =

Danish racewalker

Personal information
- Nationality: Danish
- Born: 24 December 1928 Frederiksberg, Denmark
- Died: 13 December 2022 (aged 93)

Sport
- Sport: Athletics
- Event: Racewalking

Leo Rosschou (24 December 1928 – 13 December 2022) was a Danish racewalker. He competed in the men's 20 kilometres walk at the 1960 Summer Olympics.
