= Leonid Spirin =

Soviet Olympic gold medalist (1932–1982)

Medal record

Men's athletics

Representing the Soviet Union

Olympic Games
Gold medal – first place	1956 Melbourne	20 km Walk

European Championships
Silver medal – second place	1958 Stockholm	20 km walk

Leonid Vasilevich Spirin (Russian: Леонид Васильевич Спирин, 21 June 1932 – 23 February 1982) was a Russian athlete who competed for the Soviet Union. He was born in Zhavoronki.

He competed for the USSR in the 1956 Summer Olympics held in Melbourne, Australia in the 20 kilometer walk where he won the gold medal.

Spirin was awarded the Order of the Badge of Honor (1957).

Records
Preceded by Vladimir Guk	Men's 20km Walk World Record Holder; 7 July 1959 – 15 July 1959	Succeeded by Volodymyr Holubnychy
