= Louis Marquis =

Swiss racewalker (1929–2024)

Personal information
- Nationality: SUI
- Born: 14 September 1929 Mervelier, Switzerland
- Died: 26 September 2024 (aged 95)
- Height: 5 ft 7 in (170 cm)
- Weight: 60 kg (130 lb)

Sport
- Sport: Athletics
- Event: Racewalking
- Club: Rapid Club Genève

Achievements and titles
- Personal bests: 20 km walk: 1-33:23 (1956); 50 km walk: 4-29:43 (1956)

Louis Marquis (14 September 1929 – 26 September 2024) was a Swiss racewalker. He competed in the 20 km walk and the 50 km walk events at the 1960 Summer Olympics. Marquis died on 26 September 2024, at the age of 95.
