= Delémont District =

Coordinates: 47°21′N 7°20′E

Delémont District District de Delémont
- District
- Flag Coat of arms
- Country: Switzerland
- Canton: Jura
- Capital: Delémont

Area
  - Total: 303.23 km^{2} (117.08 sq mi)

Population (2020)
  - Total: 38,954
  - Density: 128.46/km^{2} (332.72/sq mi)
- Time zone: UTC+1 (CET)
  - Summer (DST): UTC+2 (CEST)
- Municipalities: 19

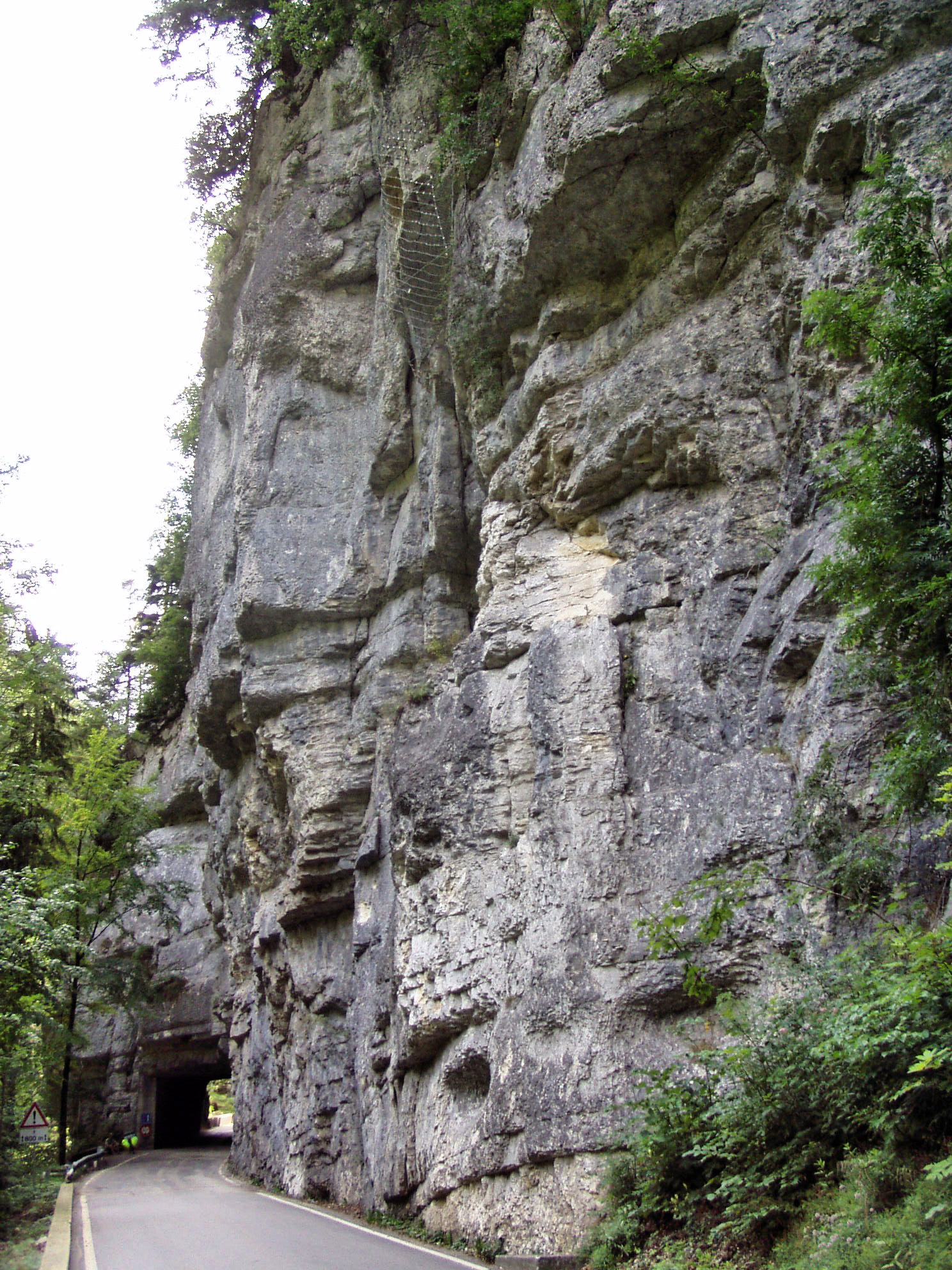
Gorges du Pichoux

Delémont District (German: Delsberg) is one of the four districts of the canton of Jura, Switzerland. Its capital, and that of the canton, is the city of Delémont. The district is almost entirely French-speaking and has a population of 38,954 (as of 31 December 2020).

== Municipalities ==
Delémont is divided into a total of 19 municipalities:

| Coat of Arms | Municipality | Population (31 December 2020) | Area km^{2} |
|---|---|---|---|
| | Boécourt | 923 | 12.35 |
| | Bourrignon | 270 | 13.55 |
| | Châtillon | 485 | 5.31 |
| | Courchapoix | 446 | 6.39 |
| | Courrendlin | 3,631 | 11.09 |
| | Courroux | 3,313 | 19.74 |
| | Courtételle | 2,644 | 13.56 |
| | Delémont | 12,618 | 21.97 |
| | Develier | 1,371 | 12.47 |
| | Ederswiler | 118 | 3.31 |
| | Haute-Sorne | 7,167 | 71.04 |
| | Mervelier | 528 | 9.74 |
| | Mettembert | 108 | 2.34 |
| | Movelier | 415 | 8.08 |
| | Pleigne | 349 | 17.84 |
| | Rossemaison | 687 | 1.89 |
| | Saulcy | 255 | 7.86 |
| | Soyhières | 436 | 7.51 |
| | Val Terbi | 8,651 | 38.84 |
| | Total | 38,954 | 303.23 |

== Coat of arms ==
The blazon of the district coat of arms is Gules, a Crosier and Coupeaux of Six all Argent.

== Demographics ==
Delémont has a population (as of December 2020) of 38,954.

Most of the population (as of 2000) speaks French (30,393 or 88.1%) as their first language, German is the second most common (1,569 or 4.5%) and Italian is the third (832 or 2.4%). There are 15 people who speak Romansh.

As of 2008, the population was 49.2% male and 50.8% female. The population was made up of 14,794 Swiss men (41.1% of the population) and 2,907 (8.1%) non-Swiss men. There were 15,754 Swiss women (43.8%) and 2,501 (7.0%) non-Swiss women. Of the population in the district, 12,883 or about 37.4% were born in Delémont and lived there in 2000. There were 10,201 or 29.6% who were born in the same canton, while 5,008 or 14.5% were born somewhere else in Switzerland, and 5,458 or 15.8% were born outside of Switzerland.

As of 2000, there were 13,982 people who were single and never married in the district. There were 16,924 married individuals, 2,131 widows or widowers and 1,447 individuals who are divorced.

There were 4,165 households that consist of only one person and 1,147 households with five or more people.

The historical population is given in the following chart:

== Changes ==
In 1978 with the separation of the three Jura Canton districts from the Canton of Bern, Delémont District gained land in the Birse Valley and the Scheulte Valley from its southern neighbor, Moutier District.

On 1 January 1984 the municipality of Mettemberg changed its name to Mettembert.

The municipalities of Montsevelier, Vermes and Vicques merged on 1 January 2013 into the new municipality of Val Terbi and Bassecourt, Courfaivre, Glovelier, Soulce and Undervelier merged to form Haute-Sorne.

On 1 January 2018 the former municipality of Corban merged into the municipality of Val Terbi.

On 1 January 2019 the former municipalities of Rebeuvelier and Vellerat merged into the municipality of Courrendlin.

== Politics ==
In the 2007 federal election the most popular party was the SPS which received 42% of the vote. The next three most popular parties were the CVP (19.53%), the SVP (15.02%) and the CSP (12.37%). In the federal election, a total of 10,129 votes were cast, and the voter turnout was 41.9%.

== Religion ==
From the 2000 census, 25,551 or 74.1% were Roman Catholic, while 3,741 or 10.8% belonged to the Swiss Reformed Church. Of the rest of the population, there were 166 members of an Orthodox church (or about 0.48% of the population), there were 36 individuals (or about 0.10% of the population) who belonged to the Christian Catholic Church, and there were 1,350 individuals (or about 3.91% of the population) who belonged to another Christian church. There were 14 individuals (or about 0.04% of the population) who were Jewish, and 937 (or about 2.72% of the population) who were Islamic. There were 38 individuals who were Buddhist, 42 individuals who were Hindu and 31 individuals who belonged to another church. 2,178 (or about 6.32% of the population) belonged to no church, are agnostic or atheist, and 1,068 individuals (or about 3.10% of the population) did not answer the question.

== Education ==
In Delémont about 11,963 or (34.7%) of the population have completed non-mandatory upper secondary education, and 3,049 or (8.8%) have completed additional higher education (either university or a Fachhochschule). Of the 3,049 who completed tertiary schooling, 60.1% were Swiss men, 26.0% were Swiss women, 8.5% were non-Swiss men and 5.4% were non-Swiss women.

The Canton of Jura school system provides two year of non-obligatory Kindergarten, followed by six years of Primary school. This is followed by three years of obligatory lower Secondary school where the students are separated according to ability and aptitude. Following the lower Secondary students may attend a three or four year optional upper Secondary school followed by some form of Tertiary school or they may enter an apprenticeship.

During the 2009–10 school year, there were a total of 3,381 students attending 191 classes in Delémont District. There were 45 kindergarten classes with a total of 795 students in the district. The district had 146 primary classes and 2,586 students.
