= Stan Vickers =

British racewalker

Personal information
- Nationality: British (English)
- Born: 18 June 1932 Lewisham, England
- Died: 17 April 2013 (aged 80) Seaford, England
- Height: 185 cm (6 ft 1 in)
- Weight: 60 kg (132 lb)

Sport
- Sport: Athletics
- Event: racewalking
- Club: Belgrave Harriers
Medal record
Men's athletics
Representing Great Britain
Olympic Games
Bronze medal – third place	1960 Rome	20 km Walk
European Championships
Gold medal – first place	1958 Stockholm	20 km walk

Stanley Frank Vickers (18 June 1932 – 17 April 2013) was British athlete who competed at the 1956 Summer Olympics and the 1960 Summer Olympics.

== Biography ==
Vickers was born in Lewisham and was a member of the Belgrave Harriers.

Vickers finished second behind George Coleman in the 7 miles walk event at the 1956 AAA Championships. The following year he became the British 10,000 metres walk champion and the British 2 miles walk champion after winning both AAA Championships titles at the 1957 AAA Championships.

He repeated the feat at the 1958 AAA Championships, cementing his reputation as the leading racewalker in Britain at the time. One month later he won the gold medal at the 1958 European Athletics Championships in Stockholm, in the 20km walk event.

Vickers won a final AAA title over 2 miles at the 1960 AAA Championships. Shortly afterwards at the 1960 Olympic Games in Rome, he represented Great Britain in the 20 kilometre walk held in Rome, Italy, where he won the bronze medal. After the race, he sat down to rest and was carried off by an ambulance crew that thought he was sick. The crew did not speak English. Several hours passed before officials discovered what had happened.

Vickers worked at the London Stock Exchange. He died on 19 April 2013 at the age of 80.
