= Vermes, Switzerland =

Vermes
- Former municipality
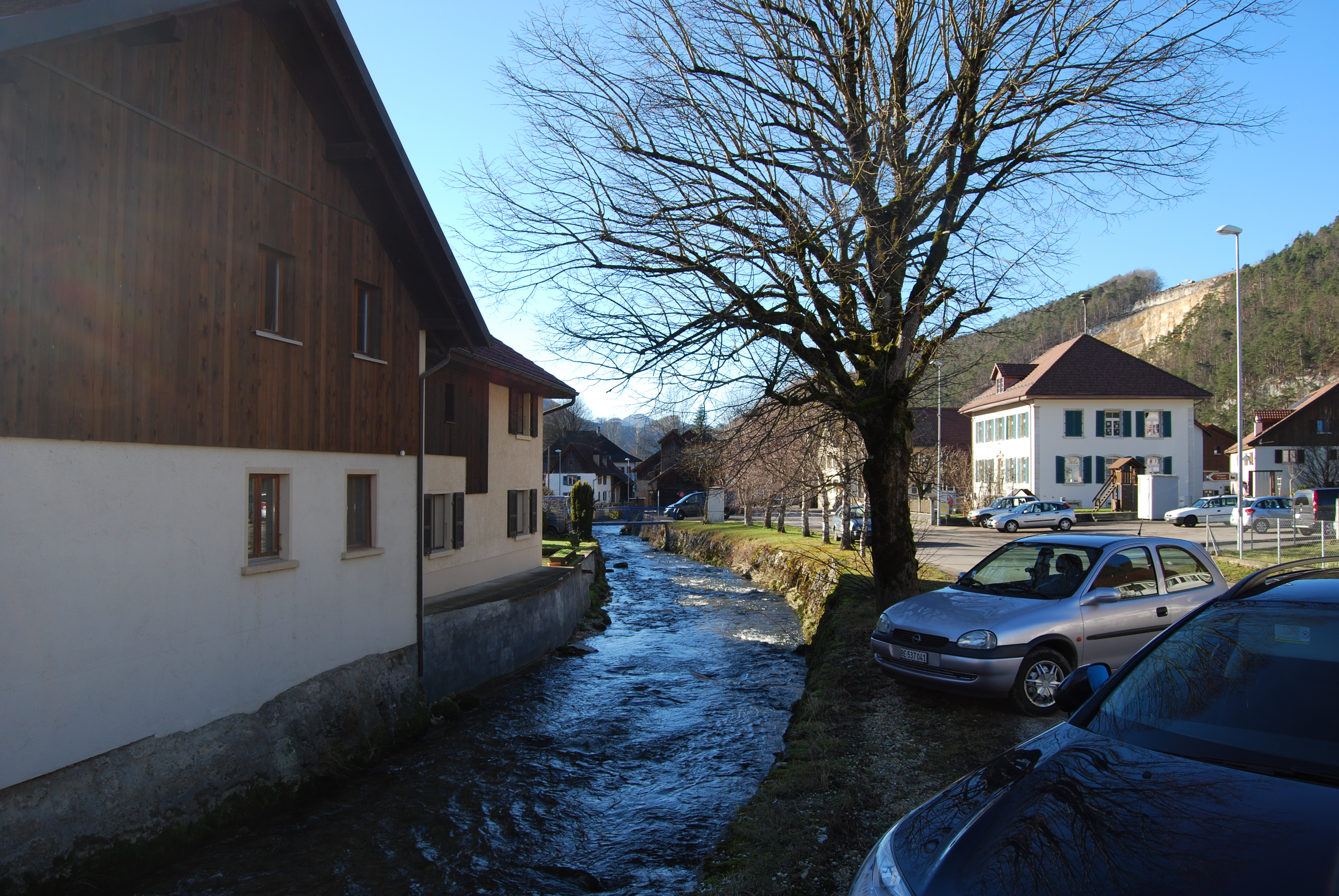
- Vermes village

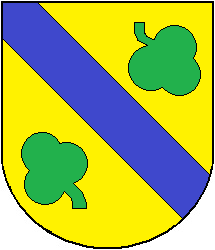
- Coat of arms
- Location of Vermes
- Location within Switzerland Location within Canton of Jura
- Coordinates: 47°20′N 07°29′E
- Country: Switzerland
- Canton: Jura
- District: Delémont

Area
  - Total: 18.32 km^{2} (7.07 sq mi)
- Elevation: 566 m (1,857 ft)

Population (2011)
  - Total: 321
  - Density: 17.5/km^{2} (45.4/sq mi)
- Time zone: UTC+01:00 (CET)
  - Summer (DST): UTC+02:00 (CEST)
- Postal code: 2829
- SFOS number: 482
- ISO 3166 code: CH-JU
- Surrounded by: Rebeuvelier, Vicques, Courchapoix, Corban, Mervelier, Schelten(BE), Elay(BE), Corcelles(BE), Crémines(BE)
- Website: www.vermes.ch

Vermes (French pronunciation: [vɛʁm]) is a former municipality in the district of Delémont in the canton of Jura in Switzerland. The municipalities of Montsevelier, Vermes and Vicques merged on 1 January 2013 into the new municipality of Val Terbi.

== History ==
Very little is known about the early centuries of Vermes. The village is first mentioned in 769 by the name of Verteme, supposedly derived from the Gaulish word vertima, meaning mountain top. It is again mentioned in 866 as Vertima and in 1308 as Vermunt.

The village of Vermes has its origins in the Saint Paul monastery, which was built in the 7th century by monks of the order of Saint Columban of Luxeuil. The abbot of Luxeuil Saint Waldebert has appointed Saint Germanus of Granfelden abbot of Moutier; at the same time he was assigned the smaller monasteries of Vermes and Saint-Ursanne. Saint Germanus governed the monasteries for 35 years, leading into an era of expansion and prosperity. In the 9th century the Columban Rule was abandoned and Saint Paul transformed into a Benedictine monastery. After nearly three centuries of existence, the Saint Paul monastery of Vermes was most likely dissolved around the year 962 by the sons of Liutfried VI, Count of Upper Alsace. The remains of the monastery are still clearly visible upon Sur les Clos in Vermes.

== Geography ==
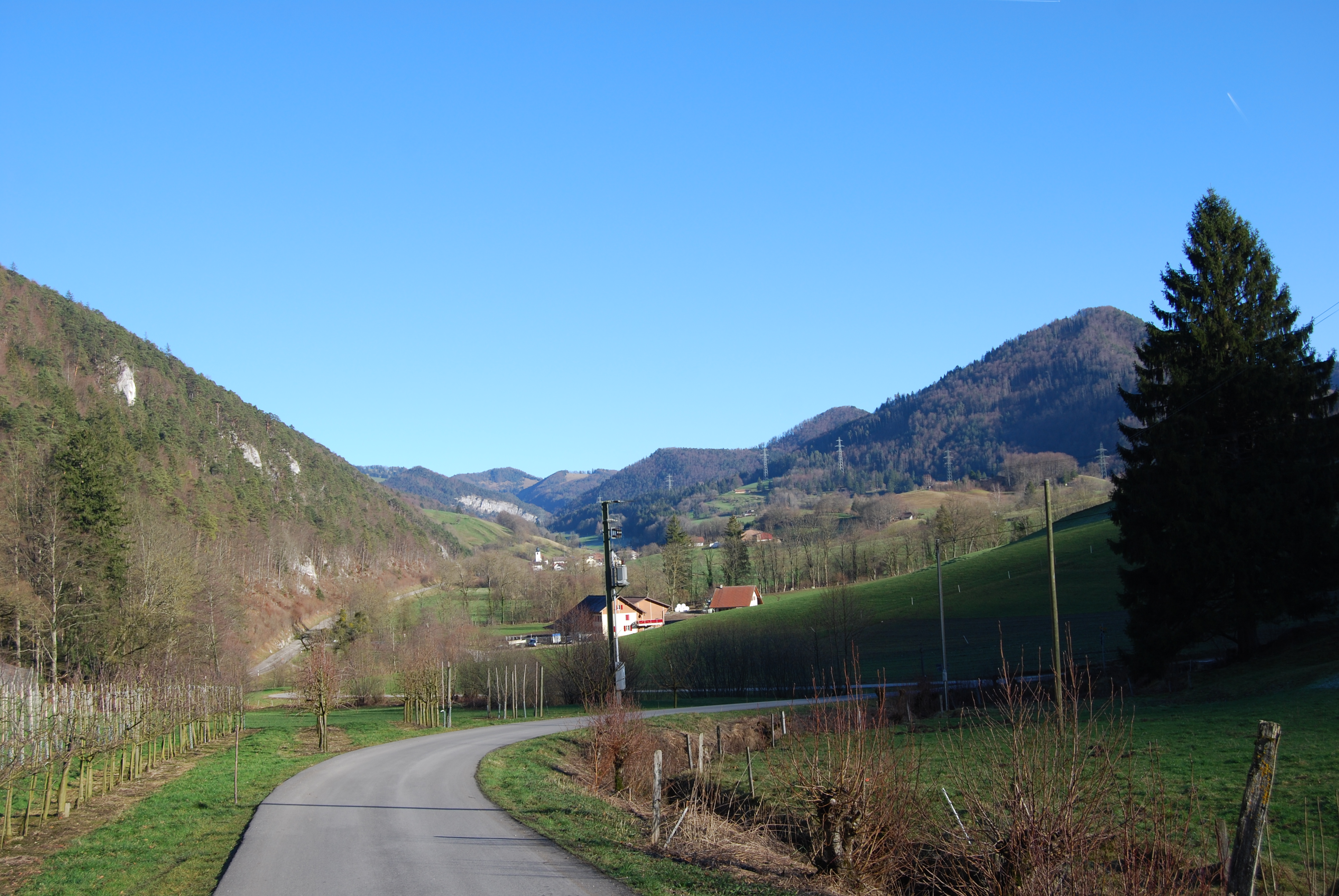
Walking path in Vermes village

Vermes had an area of 18.3 km^{2} (7.07 sq mi). Of this area, 7.08 km^{2} (2.73 mi^{2}) or 38.7% is used for agricultural purposes, while 10.42 km^{2} (4.02 mi^{2}) or 56.9% is forested. Of the rest of the land, 0.65 km^{2} (0.25 mi^{2}) or 3.6% is settled (buildings or roads), 0.04 km^{2} (9.9 acres) or 0.2% is either rivers or lakes and 0.06 km^{2} (15 acres) or 0.3% is unproductive land.

Of the built up area, housing and buildings made up 1.6% and transportation infrastructure made up 1.5%. Out of the forested land, 53.8% of the total land area is heavily forested and 3.1% is covered with orchards or small clusters of trees. Of the agricultural land, 4.0% is used for growing crops and 20.1% is pastures and 14.4% is used for alpine pastures. All the water in the municipality is flowing water.

The former municipality is located in the Delemont district, in the val Terbi. It consists of the village of Vermes, the hamlet of Envelier and Raymontpierre Castle.

== Coat of arms ==
The blazon of the municipal coat of arms is Or, a Bend Azure between two Trefoils Vert in bend counterposed.

== Demographics ==
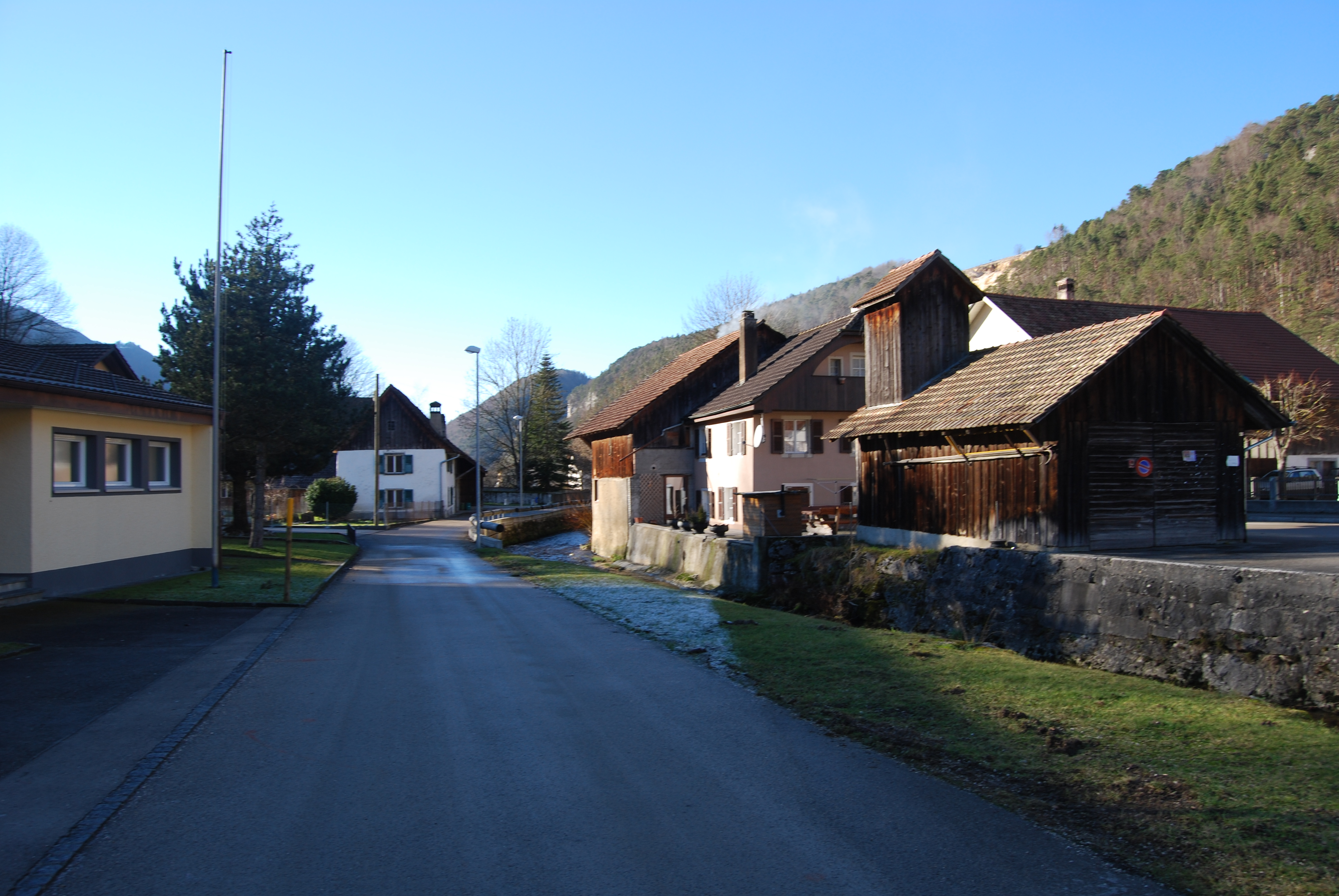
Gabiare stream and houses in Vermes

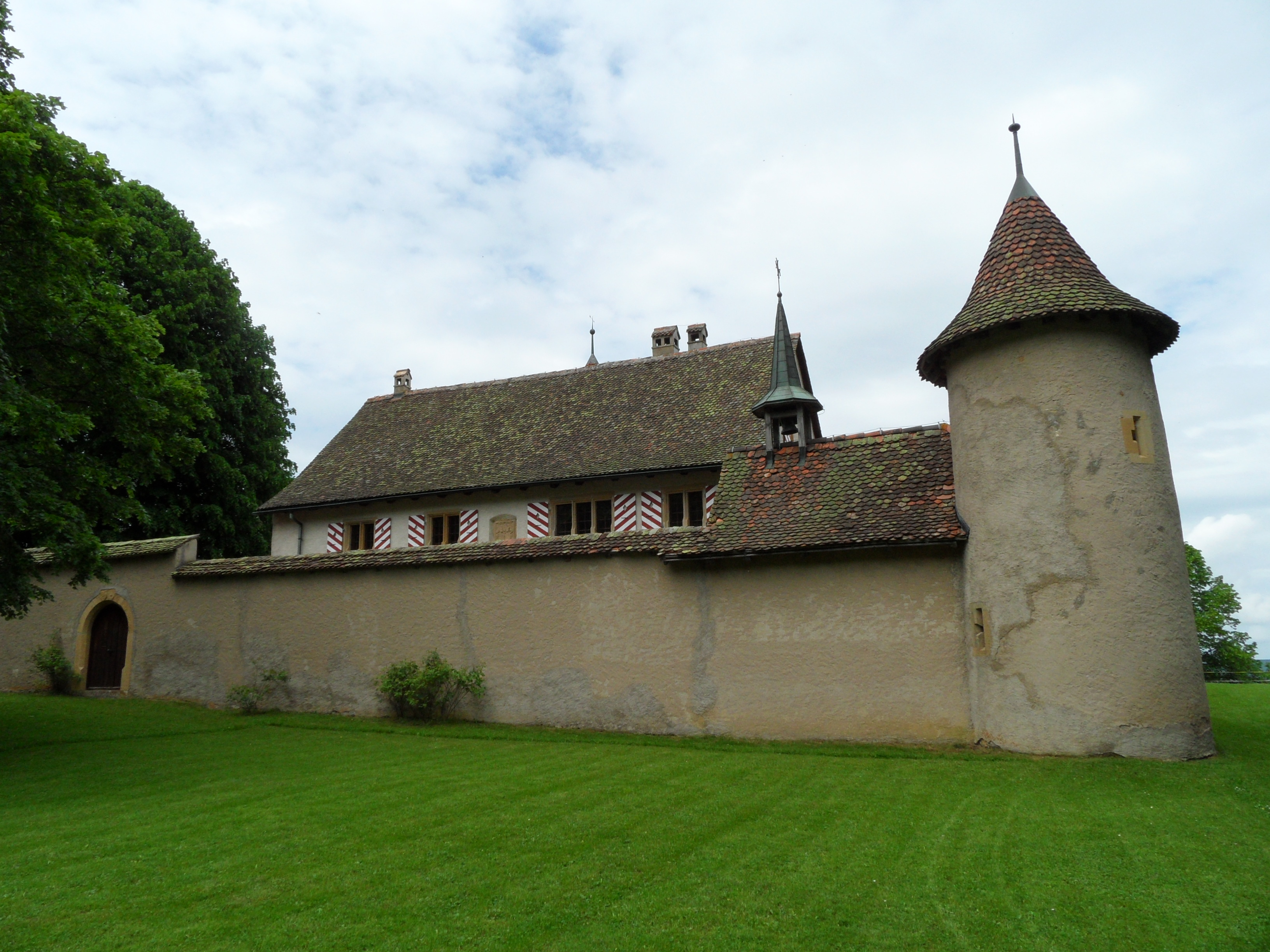
Raymontpierre (Remontstein) Castle

Vermes has a population (as of 2011) of 321. As of 2008, 3.9% of the population are resident foreign nationals. Over the last 10 years (2000–2010) the population has changed at a rate of 7.8%. Migration accounted for 11.7%, while births and deaths accounted for -2.9%.

Most of the population (as of 2000) speaks French (222 or 69.6%) as their first language, German is the second most common (90 or 28.2%) and English is the third (5 or 1.6%). There are 2 people who speak Italian.

As of 2008, the population was 52.1% male and 47.9% female. The population was made up of 167 Swiss men (50.3% of the population) and 6 (1.8%) non-Swiss men. There were 152 Swiss women (45.8%) and 7 (2.1%) non-Swiss women. Of the population in the municipality, 133 or about 41.7% were born in Vermes and lived there in 2000. There were 56 or 17.6% who were born in the same canton, while 88 or 27.6% were born somewhere else in Switzerland, and 30 or 9.4% were born outside of Switzerland.

As of 2000, children and teenagers (0–19 years old) make up 24.5% of the population, while adults (20–64 years old) make up 56.4% and seniors (over 64 years old) make up 19.1%.

As of 2000, there were 115 people who were single and never married in the municipality. There were 146 married individuals, 33 widows or widowers and 25 individuals who are divorced.

As of 2000, there were 130 private households in the municipality, and an average of 2.4 persons per household. There were 40 households that consist of only one person and 11 households with five or more people. In 2000, a total of 128 apartments (65.3% of the total) were permanently occupied, while 57 apartments (29.1%) were seasonally occupied and 11 apartments (5.6%) were empty. The vacancy rate for the municipality, in 2010, was 1.98%.

The historical population is given in the following chart:

== Politics ==
In the 2007 federal election the most popular party was the SPS which received 50.7% of the vote. The next three most popular parties were the SVP (23.47%), the CVP (12.21%) and the CSP (9.39%). In the federal election, a total of 109 votes were cast, and the voter turnout was 42.2%.

== Economy ==
As of 2010, Vermes had an unemployment rate of 2.5%. As of 2008, there were 58 people employed in the primary economic sector and about 19 businesses involved in this sector. 7 people were employed in the secondary sector and there were 3 businesses in this sector. 25 people were employed in the tertiary sector, with 11 businesses in this sector. There were 146 residents of the municipality who were employed in some capacity, of which females made up 41.8% of the workforce.

In 2008 the total number of full-time equivalent jobs was 66. The number of jobs in the primary sector was 44, of which 42 were in agriculture and 2 were in forestry or lumber production. The number of jobs in the secondary sector was 6, all of which were in manufacturing. The number of jobs in the tertiary sector was 16. In the tertiary sector; 4 or 25.0% were in wholesale or retail sales or the repair of motor vehicles, 8 or 50.0% were in a hotel or restaurant, 3 or 18.8% were in education.

In 2000, there were 9 workers who commuted into the municipality and 82 workers who commuted away. The municipality is a net exporter of workers, with about 9.1 workers leaving the municipality for every one entering. Of the working population, 9.6% used public transportation to get to work, and 52.7% used a private car.

== Religion ==
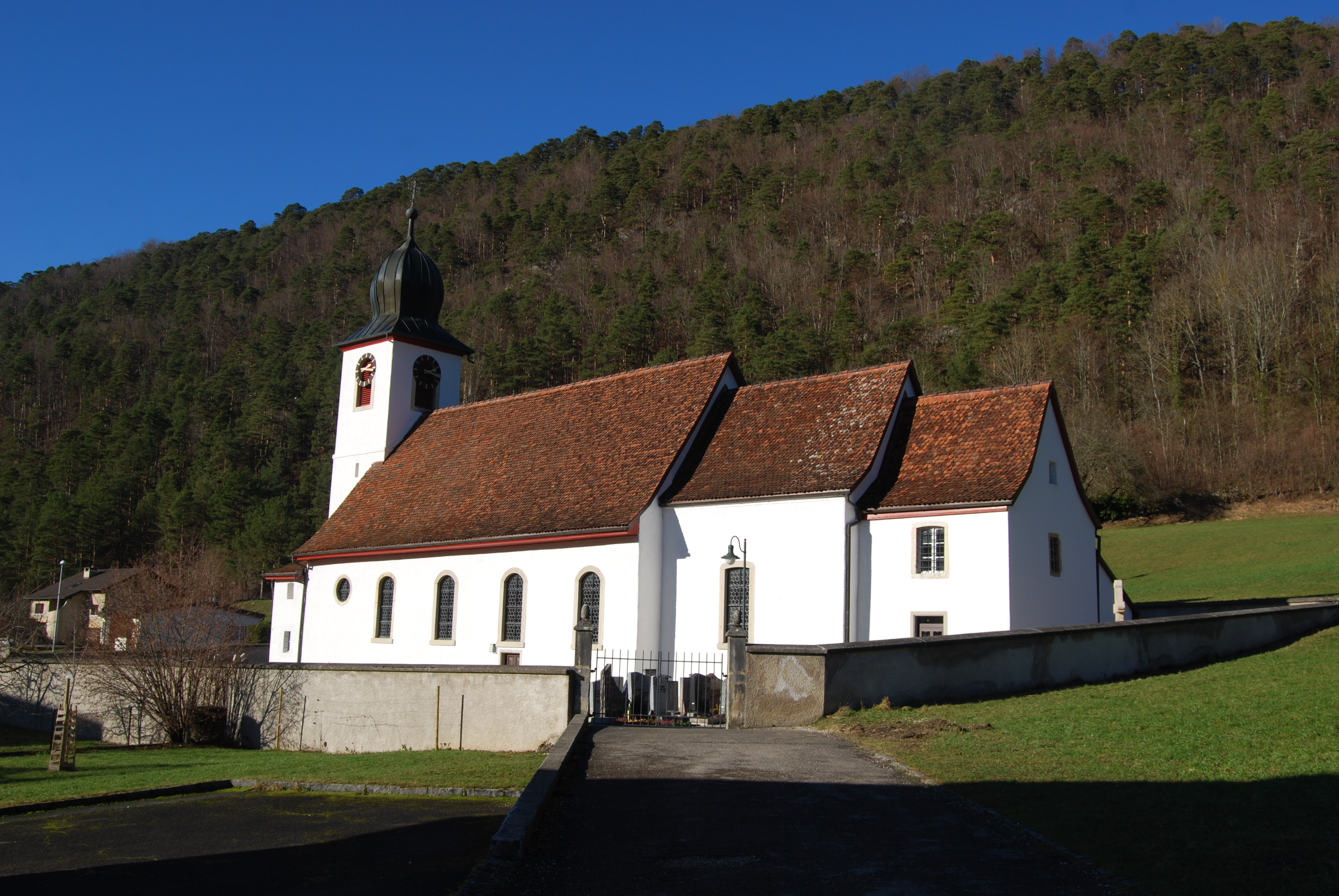
Vermes village church

From the 2000 census, 184 or 57.7% were Roman Catholic, while 42 or 13.2% belonged to the Swiss Reformed Church. Of the rest of the population, there were 84 individuals (or about 26.33% of the population) who belonged to another Christian church. There were 2 (or about 0.63% of the population) who were Islamic. There were 1 individual who belonged to another church. 37 (or about 11.60% of the population) belonged to no church, are agnostic or atheist, and 11 individuals (or about 3.45% of the population) did not answer the question.

== Education ==
In Vermes about 101 or (31.7%) of the population have completed non-mandatory upper secondary education, and 23 or (7.2%) have completed additional higher education (either university or a Fachhochschule). Of the 23 who completed tertiary schooling, 56.5% were Swiss men, 26.1% were Swiss women.

The Canton of Jura school system provides two year of non-obligatory Kindergarten, followed by six years of Primary school. This is followed by three years of obligatory lower Secondary school where the students are separated according to ability and aptitude. Following the lower Secondary students may attend a three or four year optional upper Secondary school followed by some form of Tertiary school or they may enter an apprenticeship.

During the 2009–10 school year, there were a total of 26 students attending 2 classes in Vermes. There were no kindergarten classes in the municipality. The municipality had 2 primary classes and 26 students. There are only nine Secondary schools in the canton, so all the students from Vermes attend their secondary school in another municipality.

As of 2000, there were 27 students from Vermes who attended schools outside the municipality.
