= George Hazle =

South African racewalker

Personal information
- Nationality: South African
- Born: 3 October 1924 Cape Town, South Africa
- Died: 12 November 2011 (aged 87)

Sport
- Sport: Racewalking
- Events: 20 km, 50 km

George Hazle (3 October 1924 – 12 November 2011) was a South African racewalker. He competed in the 20km and 50km walking events at the 1960 Summer Olympics.
