= Courchapoix =

- Municipality
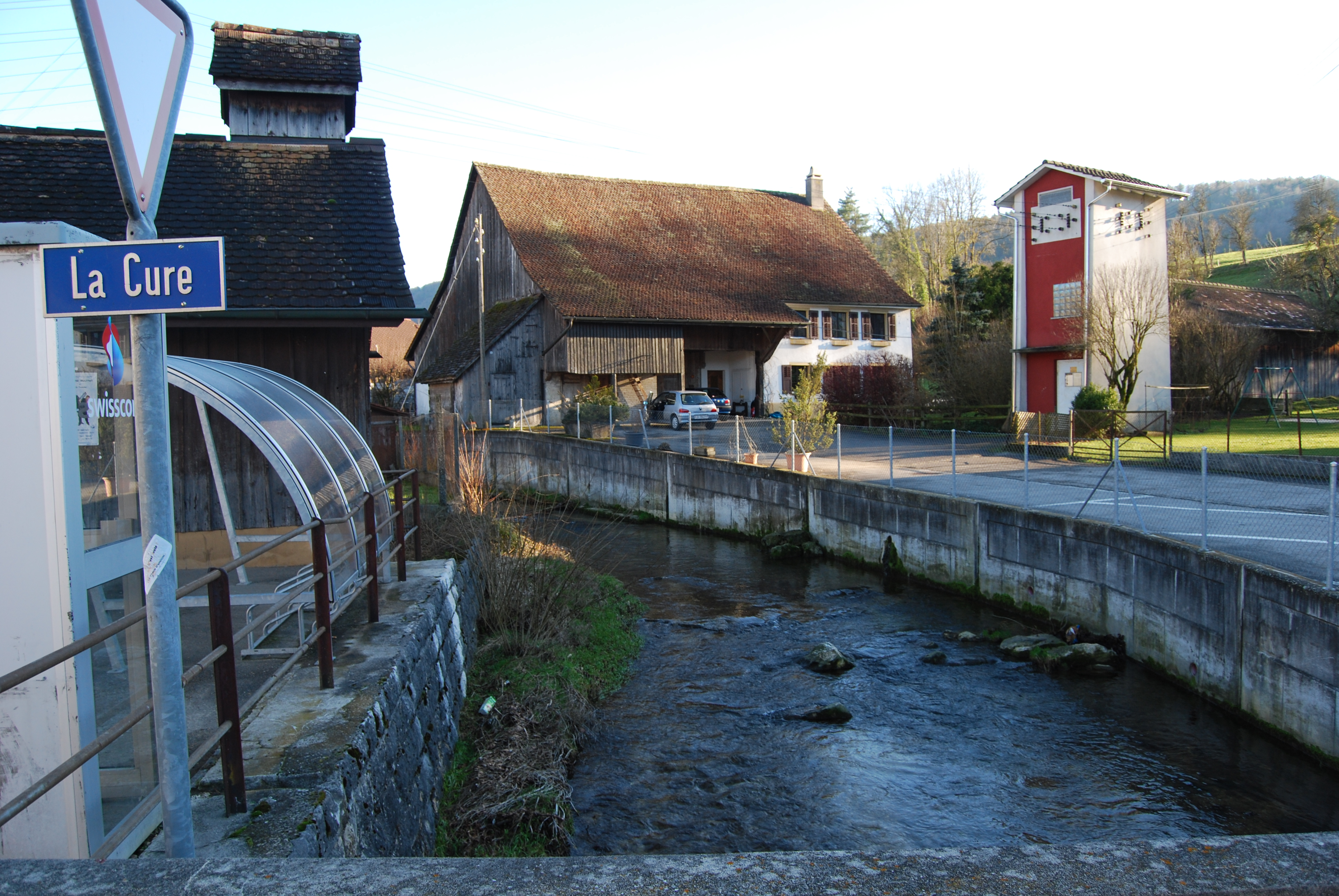
- Scheulte river in Courchapoix village

- Coat of arms
- Location of Courchapoix
- Location within Switzerland Location within Canton of Jura
- Coordinates: 47°21′N 07°27′E
- Country: Switzerland
- Canton: Jura
- District: Delémont

Government
  - Executive: Conseil communal with 7 members
  - Mayor: Maire; Céline Jaussi (as of 2026)

Area
  - Total: 6.40 km^{2} (2.47 sq mi)
- Elevation: 496 m (1,627 ft)

Population (2003)
  - Total: 416
  - Density: 65.0/km^{2} (168/sq mi)
- Time zone: UTC+01:00 (CET)
  - Summer (DST): UTC+02:00 (CEST)
- Postal code: 2825
- SFOS number: 6706
- ISO 3166 code: CH-JU
- Surrounded by: Vicques, Vermes, Corban, Bärschwil(SO)
- Website: https://www.courchapoix.ch SFSO statistics

Courchapoix (Frainc-Comtou: Cortchapoix) is a municipality in the district of Delémont in the canton of Jura in Switzerland.

== History ==
Courchapoix is first mentioned in 1435 as Curchappoix.

== Geography ==
Aerial view (1955)

Courchapoix has an area of 6.39 km^{2} (2.47 sq mi). Of this area, 3.35 km^{2} (1.29 mi^{2}) or 52.4% is used for agricultural purposes, while 2.88 km^{2} (1.11 mi^{2}) or 45.1% is forested. Of the rest of the land, 0.19 km^{2} (0.073 mi^{2}) or 3.0% is settled (buildings or roads), 0.02 km^{2} (4.9 acres) or 0.3% is either rivers or lakes.

Of the built up area, housing and buildings made up 1.7% and transportation infrastructure made up 1.1%. Out of the forested land, 40.8% of the total land area is heavily forested and 4.2% is covered with orchards or small clusters of trees. Of the agricultural land, 26.0% is used for growing crops and 16.0% is pastures and 10.3% is used for alpine pastures. All the water in the municipality is flowing water.

The municipality is located in the Delemont district, in the eastern Val Terbi.

The municipalities of Corban, Courchapoix, Courroux, Mervelier, Montsevelier, Vermes and Vicques are considering a merger on at a date in the future into the new municipality of Val Terbi.

== Coat of arms ==
The blazon of the municipal coat of arms is Per bend Sable two batons fleury in saltire crossed with a baton topped with a hand all Or and Gules through a Cog Wheel a Head of Grain all of the third, overall a Bendlet Argent.

== Demographics ==
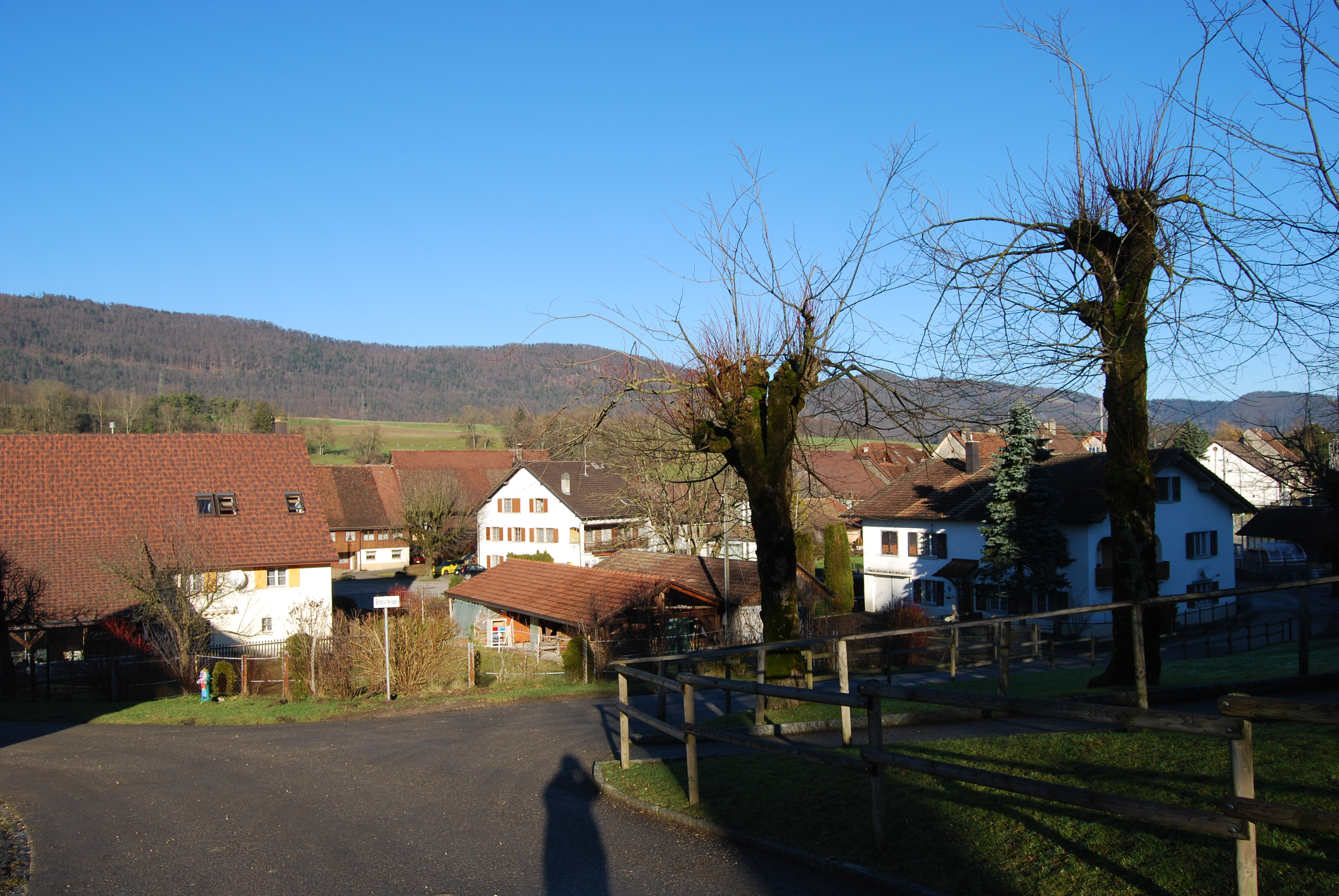
Courchapoix

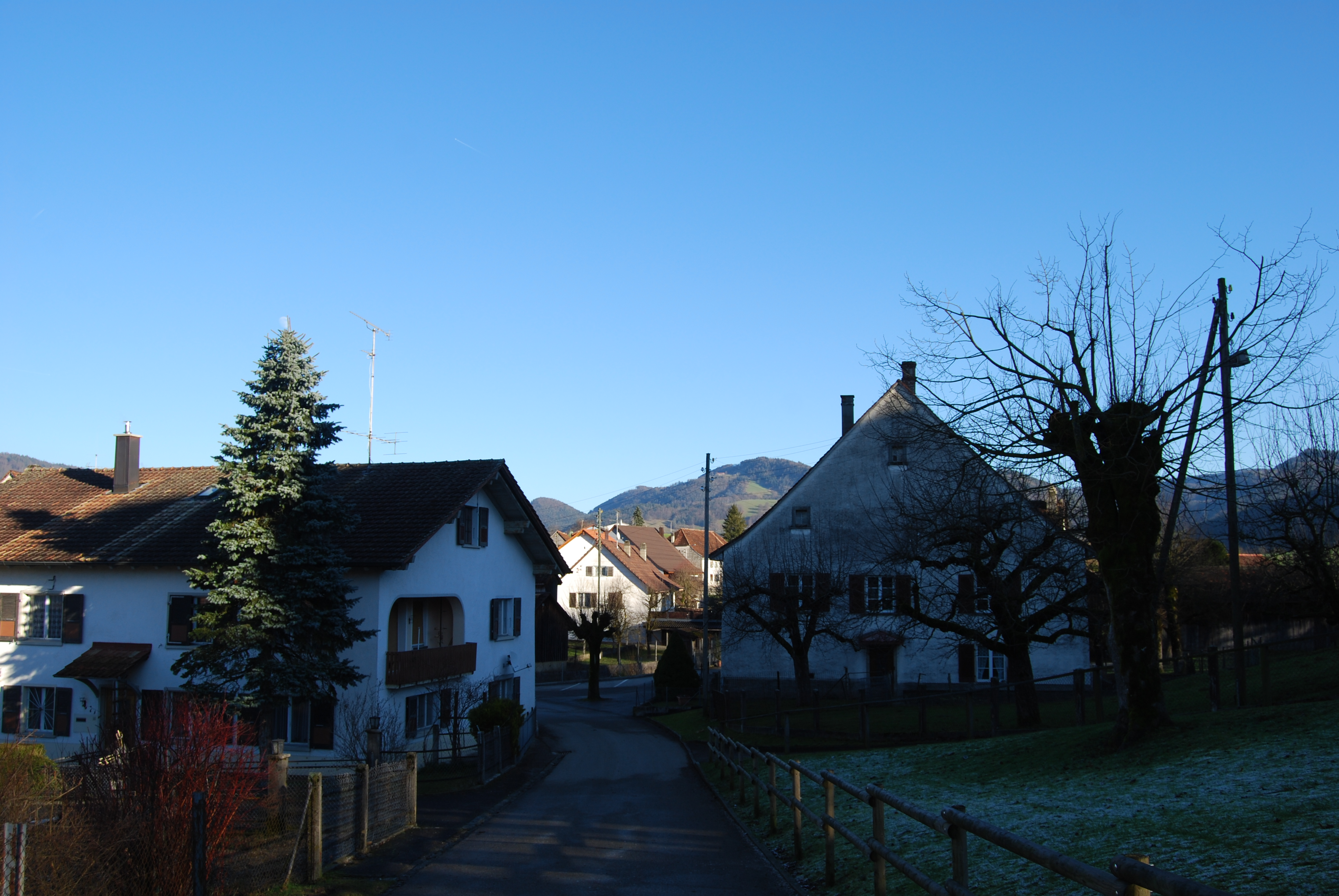
Houses in Courchapoix

Courchapoix has a population (as of December 2020) of 446. As of 2008, 3.2% of the population are resident foreign nationals. Over the last 10 years (2000–2010) the population has changed at a rate of -0.9%. Migration accounted for -6.6%, while births and deaths accounted for 4.9%.

Most of the population (as of 2000) speaks French (393 or 98.5%) as their first language, German is the second most common (5 or 1.3%) and Italian is the third (1 or 0.3%).

As of 2008, the population was 49.9% male and 50.1% female. The population was made up of 199 Swiss men (47.3% of the population) and 11 (2.6%) non-Swiss men. There were 205 Swiss women (48.7%) and 6 (1.4%) non-Swiss women. Of the population in the municipality, 203 or about 50.9% were born in Courchapoix and lived there in 2000. There were 128 or 32.1% who were born in the same canton, while 40 or 10.0% were born somewhere else in Switzerland, and 19 or 4.8% were born outside of Switzerland.

As of 2000, children and teenagers (0–19 years old) make up 27.8% of the population, while adults (20–64 years old) make up 59.6% and seniors (over 64 years old) make up 12.5%.

As of 2000, there were 188 people who were single and never married in the municipality. There were 187 married individuals, 18 widows or widowers and 6 individuals who are divorced.

As of 2000, there were 146 private households in the municipality, and an average of 2.7 persons per household. There were 38 households that consist of only one person and 19 households with five or more people. In 2000, a total of 144 apartments (90.0% of the total) were permanently occupied, while 14 apartments (8.8%) were seasonally occupied and 2 apartments (1.3%) were empty. As of 2009, the construction rate of new housing units was 7.1 new units per 1000 residents. The vacancy rate for the municipality, in 2010, was 3.41%.

The historical population is given in the following chart:

== Politics ==
In the 2007 federal election the most popular party was the SPS which received 47.48% of the vote. The next three most popular parties were the CVP (23.95%), the SVP (15.55%) and the CSP (10.5%). In the federal election, a total of 120 votes were cast, and the voter turnout was 39.0%.

== Economy ==
As of 2010, Courchapoix had an unemployment rate of 2.8%. As of 2008, there were 27 people employed in the primary economic sector and about 11 businesses involved in this sector. 102 people were employed in the secondary sector and there were 4 businesses in this sector. 13 people were employed in the tertiary sector, with 4 businesses in this sector. There were 201 residents of the municipality who were employed in some capacity, of which females made up 39.8% of the workforce.

In 2008 the total number of full-time equivalent jobs was 125. The number of jobs in the primary sector was 16, all of which were in agriculture. The number of jobs in the secondary sector was 101 of which 96 or (95.0%) were in manufacturing and 5 (5.0%) were in construction. The number of jobs in the tertiary sector was 8. In the tertiary sector; 1 was in the sale or repair of motor vehicles, 2 or 25.0% were in a hotel or restaurant, 3 or 37.5% were in education.

In 2000, there were 56 workers who commuted into the municipality and 155 workers who commuted away. The municipality is a net exporter of workers, with about 2.8 workers leaving the municipality for every one entering. Of the working population, 17.4% used public transportation to get to work, and 64.2% used a private car.

== Religion ==
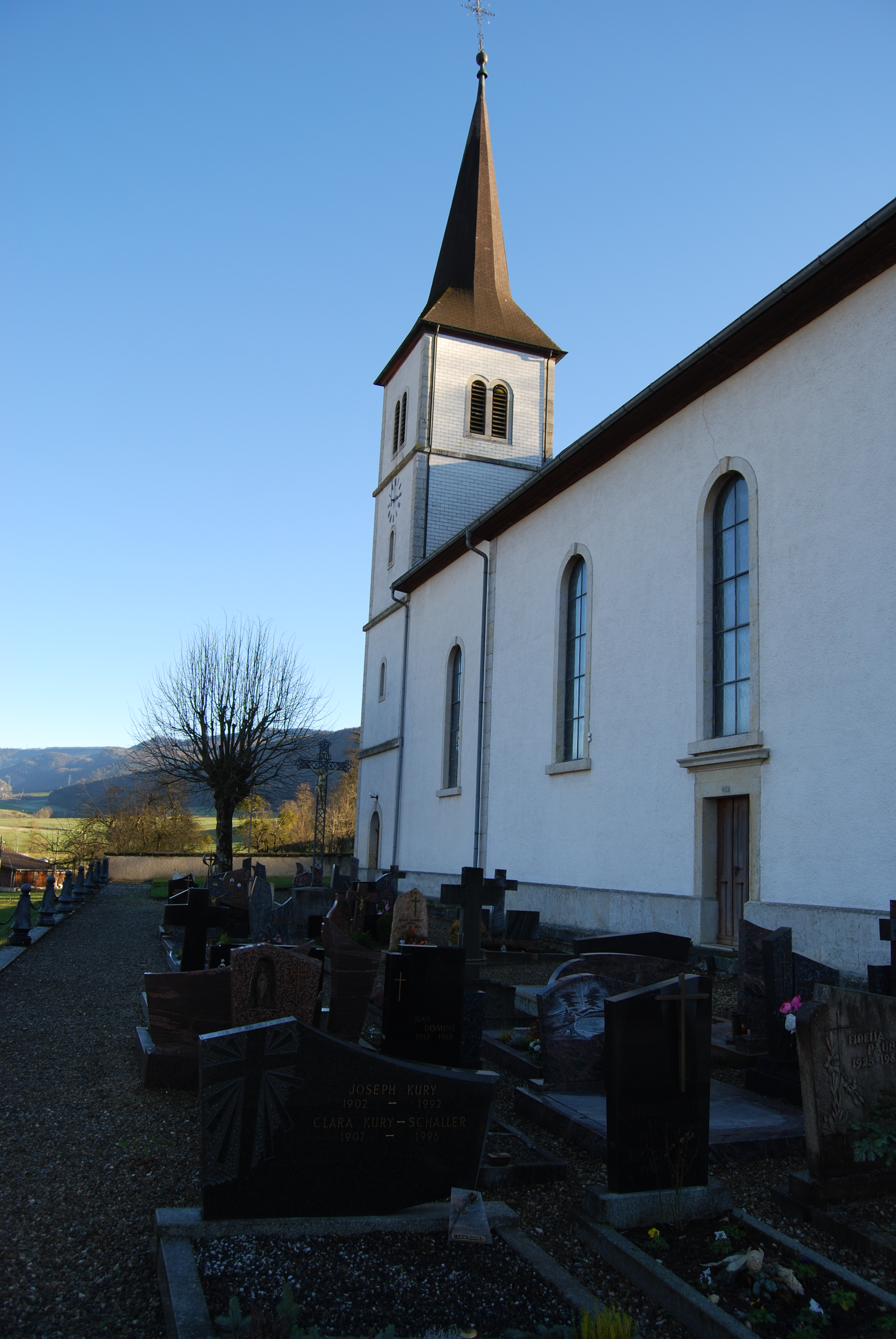
Courchapoix village church

From the 2000 census, 341 or 85.5% were Roman Catholic, while 17 or 4.3% belonged to the Swiss Reformed Church. Of the rest of the population, there were 29 individuals (or about 7.27% of the population) who belonged to another Christian church. There was 1 individual who was Islamic. 17 (or about 4.26% of the population) belonged to no church, are agnostic or atheist, and 8 individuals (or about 2.01% of the population) did not answer the question.

== Education ==
In Courchapoix about 138 or (34.6%) of the population have completed non-mandatory upper secondary education, and 26 or (6.5%) have completed additional higher education (either university or a Fachhochschule). Of the 26 who completed tertiary schooling, 76.9% were Swiss men, 19.2% were Swiss women.

The Canton of Jura school system provides two year of non-obligatory Kindergarten, followed by six years of Primary school. This is followed by three years of obligatory lower Secondary school where the students are separated according to ability and aptitude. Following the lower Secondary students may attend a three or four year optional upper Secondary school followed by some form of Tertiary school or they may enter an apprenticeship.

During the 2009-10 school year, there were a total of 29 students attending 3 classes in Courchapoix. There were no kindergarten classes in the municipality. The municipality had 2.5 primary classes and 29 students. There are only nine Secondary schools in the canton, so all the students from Courchapoix attend their secondary school in another municipality.

As of 2000, there were 34 students from Courchapoix who attended schools outside the municipality.
