= Schelten =

- Municipality
- Flag Coat of arms
- Location of Schelten
- Location within Switzerland Location within Canton of Bern
- Coordinates: 47°20′N 7°33′E
- Country: Switzerland
- Canton: Bern
- District: Jura bernois

Government
  - Executive: Gemeinderat with 5 members
  - Mayor: Gemeindepräsident; Jean-Paul Tatti (as of 2026)

Area
  - Total: 5.61 km^{2} (2.17 sq mi)
- Elevation: 746 m (2,448 ft)

Population (Dec 2011)
  - Total: 39
  - Density: 7.0/km^{2} (18/sq mi)
- Time zone: UTC+01:00 (CET)
  - Summer (DST): UTC+02:00 (CEST)
- Postal code: 2827
- SFOS number: 708
- ISO 3166 code: CH-BE
- Surrounded by: Mervelier, Vermes (JU), Aedermannsdorf (SO), Beinwil (SO)
- Website: https://www.gemeinde-schelten.ch/

Schelten (La Scheulte in French) is a municipality in the Jura bernois administrative district in the canton of Bern in Switzerland. This is one of two German speaking municipalities located in the majority French-speaking Bernese Jura (Jura Bernois). The other is Seehof.

== History ==
Schelten is first mentioned in 1563 as la Schilt. In 1914 it was mentioned as Schelten.

For most of its history it was owned by the provost of Moutier-Grandval under the Prince-Bishop of Basel. When many of the nearby cities and towns converted to the new faith of the Protestant Reformation, Schelten remained Catholic along with the sous les Roches region. After the 1797 French victory and the Treaty of Campo Formio, Schelten became part of the French Département of Mont-Terrible. Three years later, in 1800 it became part of the Département of Haut-Rhin. After Napoleon's defeat and the Congress of Vienna, Schelten was assigned to the Canton of Bern in 1815.

The village is part of the parish of Mervelier. In 1861 the Chapel of St. Anthony was built in the village. The chapel was restored in 1985–87.

Traditionally the village was French speaking, but after it became a part of the Canton of Bern in 1815 the number of German speakers increased. In 1914 its name changed from La Scheulte to Schelten to reflect the growing German speaking population. The village became a stronghold of German culture and generally opposed Jurassic separatism. In the referendums of 1974-75 the population of Schelten voted remain with Bern in contrast to the rest of the neighboring municipalities in the Val Terbi who chose to join the Canton of Jura.

== Geography ==
Schelten has an area of 5.56 km^{2} (2.15 sq mi). As of 2012, a total of 2.13 km^{2} (0.82 mi^{2}) or 38.3% is used for agricultural purposes, while 3.29 km^{2} (1.27 mi^{2}) or 59.2% is forested. Of the rest of the land, 0.11 km^{2} (27 acres) or 2.0% is settled (buildings or roads), 0.01 km^{2} (2.5 acres) or 0.2% is either rivers or lakes.

During the same year, housing and buildings made up 0.9% and transportation infrastructure made up 1.1%. Out of the forested land, 55.8% of the total land area is heavily forested and 3.4% is covered with orchards or small clusters of trees. Of the agricultural land, 11.5% is pastures and 26.6% is used for alpine pastures. All the water in the municipality is flowing water.

The municipality is located at the foot of the Schelten Pass along the Delémont-Balsthal road. It is the northernmost municipality in the Canton of Bern.

On 31 December 2009 District de Moutier, the municipality's former district, was dissolved. On the following day, 1 January 2010, it joined the newly created Arrondissement administratif Jura bernois.

== Coat of arms ==
The blazon of the municipal coat of arms is Argent an Oak Tree Vert fructed Gules issuant from a Mount of 3 Coupeaux of the second and overall a Bend wavy Azure.

== Demographics ==
Schelten has a population (as of December 2020) of 39, all Swiss citizens. Over the last 10 years (2001-2011) the population has changed at a rate of -4.9%. Migration accounted for -7.3%, while births and deaths accounted for 0%.

Most of the population (as of 2000) speaks German (43 or 82.7%) as their first language, French is the second most common (8 or 15.4%) and Spanish is the third (1 or 1.9%).

As of 2008, the population was 46.3% male and 53.7% female. The population was made up of 19 Swiss men (46.3% of the population) and (0.0%) non-Swiss men. There were 22 Swiss women (53.7%) and (0.0%) non-Swiss women. Of the population in the municipality, 16 or about 30.8% were born in Schelten and lived there in 2000. There were 12 or 23.1% who were born in the same canton, while 21 or 40.4% were born somewhere else in Switzerland, and 2 or 3.8% were born outside of Switzerland.

As of 2011, children and teenagers (0–19 years old) make up 35.9% of the population, while adults (20–64 years old) make up 46.2% and seniors (over 64 years old) make up 17.9%. As of 2000, there were 27 people who were single and never married in the municipality. There were 22 married individuals, 2 widows or widowers and 1 individuals who are divorced.

As of 2010, there were 3 households that consist of only one person and 3 households with five or more people. In 2000, a total of 16 apartments (88.9% of the total) were permanently occupied, while 2 apartments (11.1%) were seasonally occupied. The vacancy rate for the municipality, in 2012, was 5.88%. In 2011, single family homes made up 0.0% of the total housing in the municipality.

The historical population is given in the following chart:

== Politics ==
In the 2011 federal election the most popular party was the Swiss People's Party (SVP) which received 43.7% of the vote. The next three most popular parties were the Social Democratic Party (SP) (34.8%), the Green Party (9.8%) and the FDP.The Liberals (5.1%). In the federal election, a total of 21 votes were cast, and the voter turnout was 42.9%.

== Economy ==
As of 2011, Schelten had an unemployment rate of 0%. As of 2008, there were a total of 25 people employed in the municipality. Of these, there were 25 people employed in the primary economic sector and about 8 businesses involved in this sector. No one was employed in the secondary sector or the tertiary sector. There were 26 residents of the municipality who were employed in some capacity, of which females made up 42.3% of the workforce.

In 2008 there were a total of 19 full-time equivalent jobs, all of which were in agriculture.

In 2000, there were 3 workers who commuted into the municipality and 2 workers who commuted away. The municipality is a net importer of workers, with about 1.5 workers entering the municipality for every one leaving. A total of 24 workers (88.9% of the 27 total workers in the municipality) both lived and worked in Schelten. Of the working population, 15.4% used public transportation to get to work, and 7.7% used a private car.

In 2011 the average local and cantonal tax rate on a married resident, with two children, of Schelten making 150,000 CHF was 13.6%, while an unmarried resident's rate was 20%. For comparison, the rate for the entire canton in the same year, was 14.2% and 22.0%, while the nationwide rate was 12.3% and 21.1% respectively. In 2009 there were a total of 11 tax payers in the municipality. Of that total, 2 made over 75,000 CHF per year. The greatest number of workers, 6, made between 20,000 and 30,000 CHF per year. The average income of the over 75,000 CHF group in Schelten was 121,700 CHF, while the average across all of Switzerland was 130,478 CHF.

== Religion ==
From the 2000 census, 26 or 50.0% belonged to the Swiss Reformed Church, while 16 or 30.8% were Roman Catholic. 5 (or about 9.62% of the population) belonged to no church, are agnostic or atheist, and 5 individuals (or about 9.62% of the population) did not answer the question.

== Education ==
In Schelten about 41.4% of the population have completed non-mandatory upper secondary education, and 6.9% have completed additional higher education (either university or a Fachhochschule). A total of 2 Swiss men in the municipality had completed some form of tertiary schooling.

The Canton of Bern school system provides one year of non-obligatory Kindergarten, followed by six years of Primary school. This is followed by three years of obligatory lower Secondary school where the students are separated according to ability and aptitude. Following the lower Secondary students may attend additional schooling or they may enter an apprenticeship.

During the 2011–12 school year, there were a total of 10 students attending classes in Schelten. There were no kindergarten classes in the municipality and the 5 primary students attend a class in a neighboring municipality. During the same year, there was one lower secondary class with a total of 5 students.

As of 2000, there were a total of 9 students attending any school in the municipality. Of those, 2 both lived and attended school in the municipality, while 7 students came from another municipality. During the same year, 5 residents attended schools outside the municipality.
