= Lennart Carlsson (race walker) =

Swedish athlete

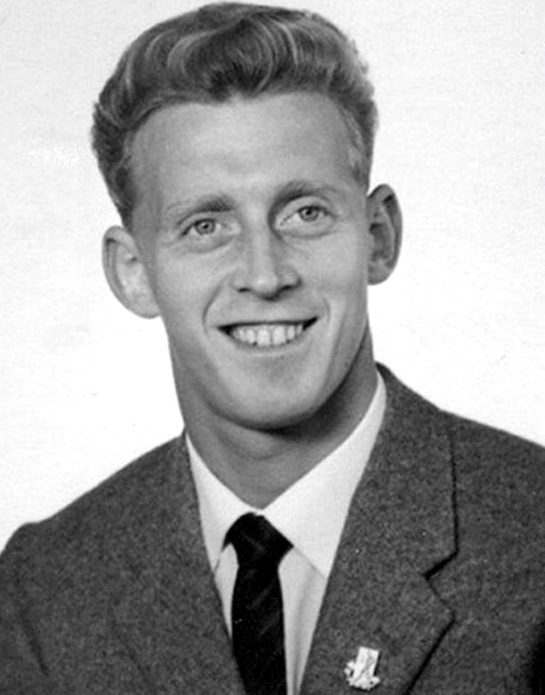

Personal information
- Born: 30 December 1933 Linköping, Sweden
- Died: 16 January 2013 (aged 80) Trollhättan, Sweden
- Height: 170 cm (5 ft 7 in)
- Weight: 76 kg (168 lb)

Sport
- Sport: Athletics
- Event: Race walking
- Club: Uddevalla Cykelamatörer

Achievements and titles
- Personal best: 20 kmW – 1:33:37 (1958)

Karl Gustaf Lennart Carlsson (30 December 1932 – 16 January 2013) was a Swedish race walker. He placed 14th in the 20 km event at the 1960 Summer Olympics and fourth at the 1958 European Championships, 16 seconds behind his compatriot Lennart Back.
