= Mervelier =

- Municipality
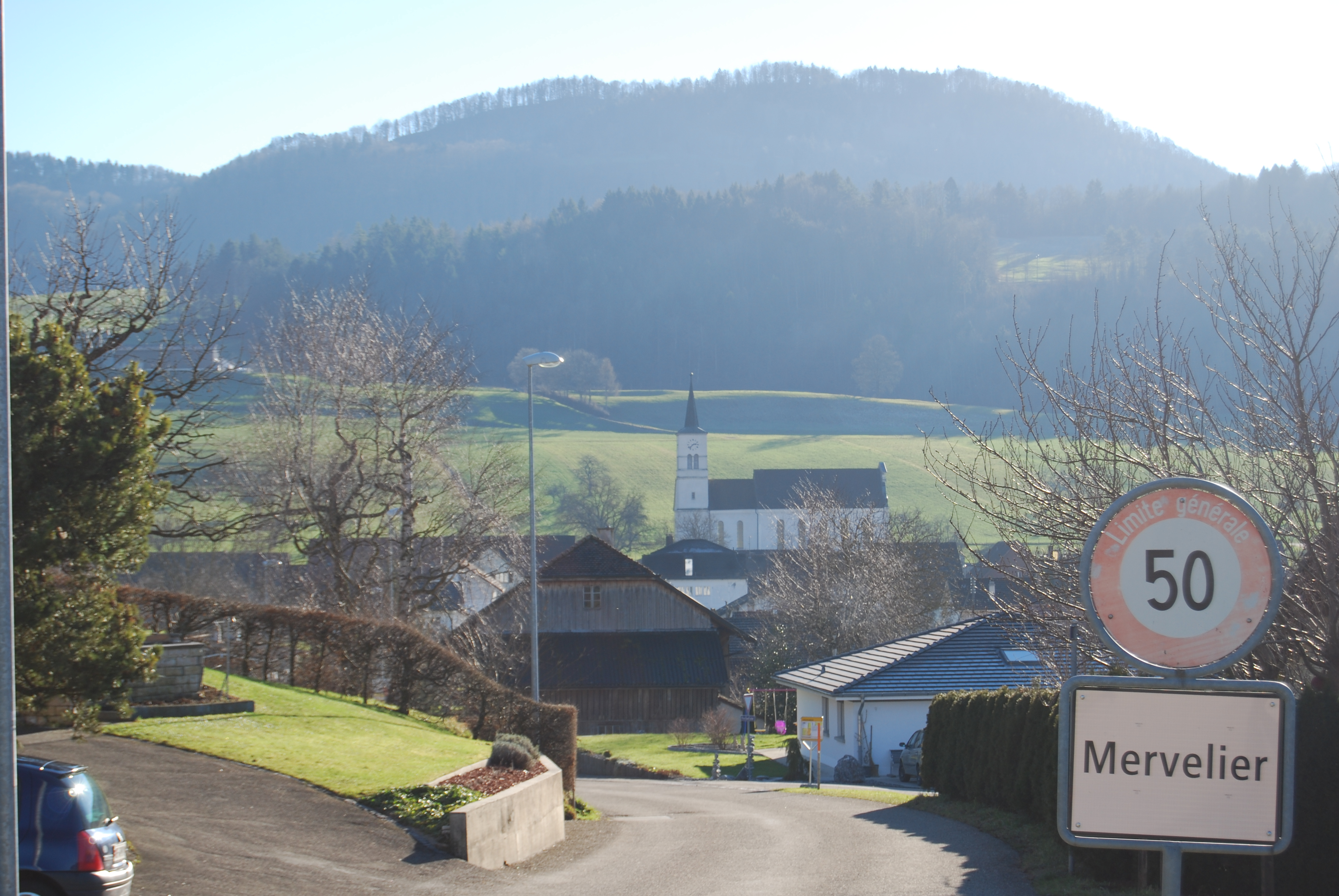
- Mervelier village

- Coat of arms
- Location of Mervelier
- Location within Switzerland Location within Canton of Jura
- Coordinates: 47°21′N 07°29′E
- Country: Switzerland
- Canton: Jura
- District: Delémont

Government
  - Executive: Conseil communal with 7 members
  - Mayor: Maire; Martine Brêchet (as of 2026)

Area
  - Total: 9.70 km^{2} (3.75 sq mi)
- Elevation: 556 m (1,824 ft)

Population (2020)
  - Total: 528
  - Density: 54.4/km^{2} (141/sq mi)
- Time zone: UTC+01:00 (CET)
  - Summer (DST): UTC+02:00 (CEST)
- Postal code: 2827
- SFOS number: 6715
- ISO 3166 code: CH-JU
- Surrounded by: Montsevelier, Corban, Vermes, Schelten(BE), Beinwil(SO)
- Website: www.mervelier.ch

Mervelier is a municipality in the district of Delémont in the canton of Jura in Switzerland.

== History ==
Mervelier is first mentioned about 1184 as Morswilre. The municipality was formerly known by its German name Morschwil, however, that name is no longer used.

== Geography ==
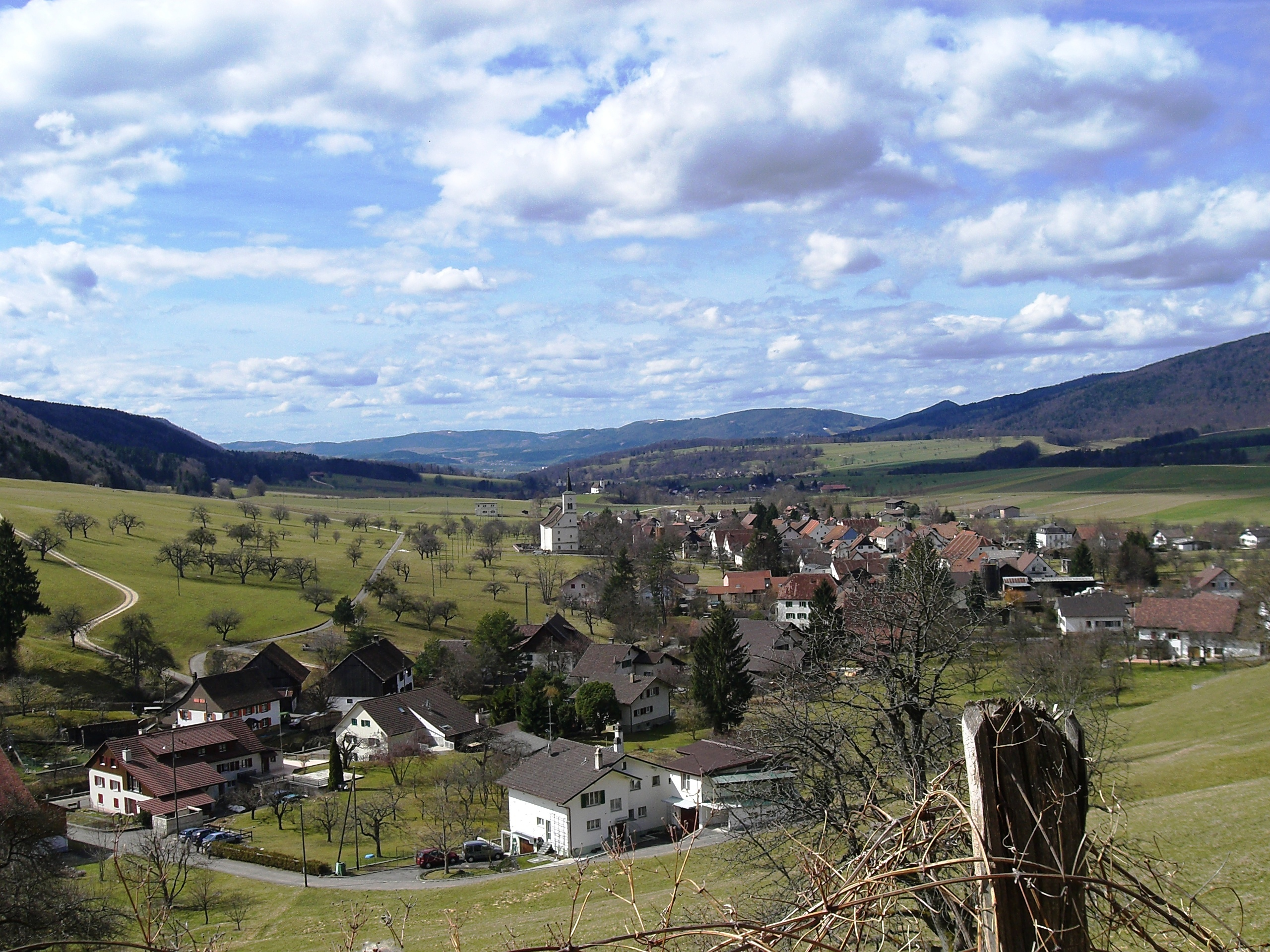
Mervelier

Aerial view (1955)

Mervelier has an area of 9.74 km^{2} (3.76 sq mi). Of this area, 4.29 km^{2} (1.66 mi^{2}) or 43.9% is used for agricultural purposes, while 5.07 km^{2} (1.96 mi^{2}) or 51.9% is forested. Of the rest of the land, 0.35 km^{2} (0.14 mi^{2}) or 3.6% is settled (buildings or roads), 0.01 km^{2} (2.5 acres) or 0.1% is either rivers or lakes and 0.03 km^{2} (7.4 acres) or 0.3% is unproductive land.

Of the built up area, housing and buildings made up 1.8% and transportation infrastructure made up 1.3%. Out of the forested land, 50.1% of the total land area is heavily forested and 1.8% is covered with orchards or small clusters of trees. Of the agricultural land, 14.0% is used for growing crops and 10.5% is pastures, while 1.6% is used for orchards or vine crops and 17.7% is used for alpine pastures. All the water in the municipality is flowing water.

The municipality is located in the Delemont district, in the Val Terbi at the foot of the Schelten Pass along the Scheulte river.

The municipalities of Corban, Courchapoix, Courroux, Mervelier, Montsevelier, Vermes and Vicques are considering a merger on at a date in the future into the new municipality of Val Terbi.

== Coat of arms ==
The blazon of the municipal coat of arms is Gules, St. Rémy depicted in bishops garb, mitred, haloed and holding a crosier Or.

== Demographics ==
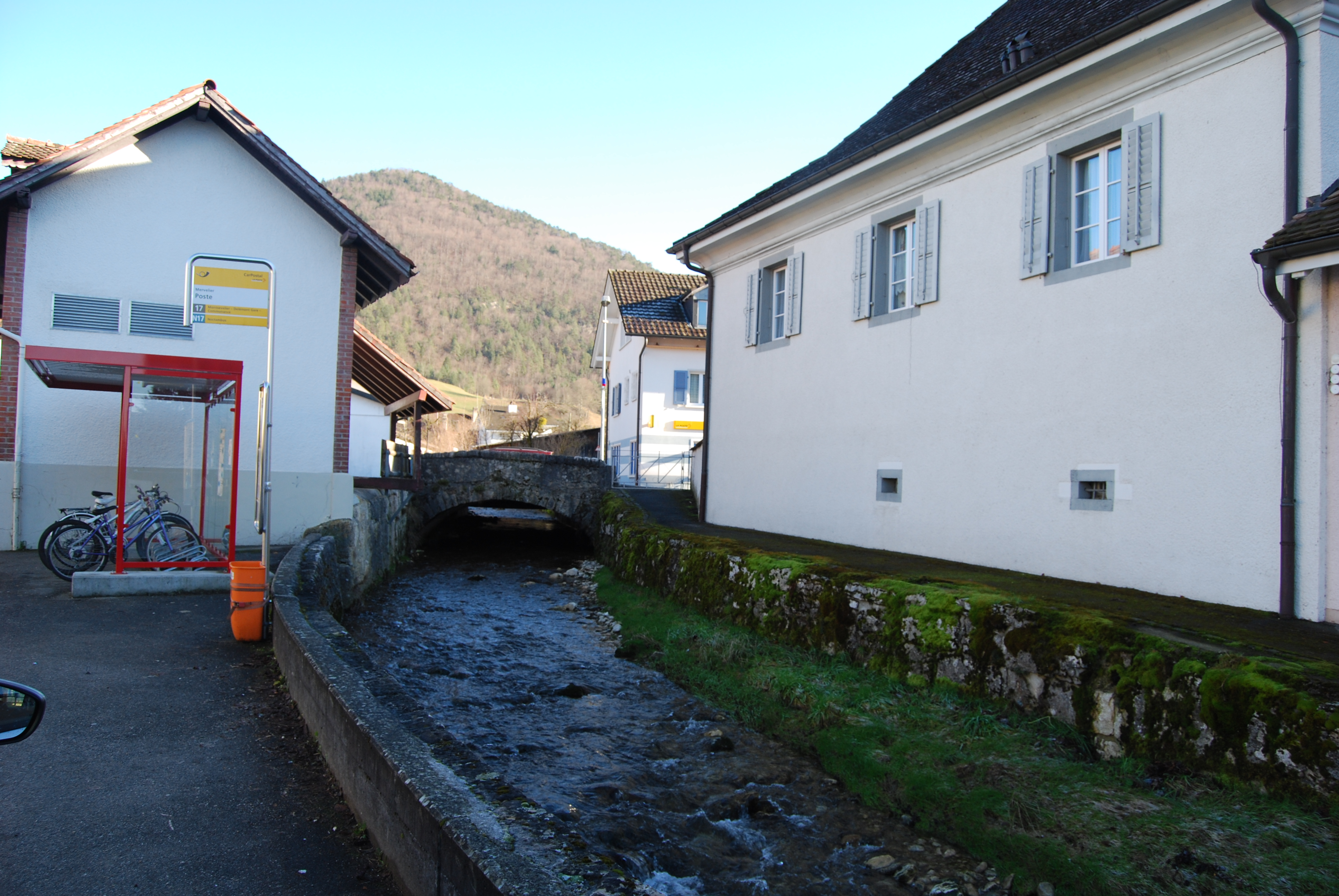
Scheulte river and houses in Mervelier

Mervelier has a population (as of December 2020) of 528. As of 2008, 1.9% of the population are resident foreign nationals. Over the last 10 years (2000–2010) the population has changed at a rate of -6.3%. Migration accounted for -2.3%, while births and deaths accounted for 1.5%.

Most of the population (as of 2000) speaks French (543 or 92.8%) as their first language, German is the second most common (31 or 5.3%) and English is the third (3 or 0.5%). There is 1 person who speaks Italian.

As of 2008, the population was 48.4% male and 51.6% female. The population was made up of 267 Swiss men (47.5% of the population) and 5 (0.9%) non-Swiss men. There were 285 Swiss women (50.7%) and 5 (0.9%) non-Swiss women. Of the population in the municipality, 303 or about 51.8% were born in Mervelier and lived there in 2000. There were 152 or 26.0% who were born in the same canton, while 84 or 14.4% were born somewhere else in Switzerland, and 33 or 5.6% were born outside of Switzerland.

As of 2000, children and teenagers (0–19 years old) make up 31.6% of the population, while adults (20–64 years old) make up 52.1% and seniors (over 64 years old) make up 16.2%.

As of 2000, there were 248 people who were single and never married in the municipality. There were 293 married individuals, 33 widows or widowers and 11 individuals who are divorced.

As of 2000, there were 202 private households in the municipality, and an average of 2.9 persons per household. There were 42 households that consist of only one person and 40 households with five or more people. In 2000, a total of 199 apartments (91.7% of the total) were permanently occupied, while 15 apartments (6.9%) were seasonally occupied and 3 apartments (1.4%) were empty. The vacancy rate for the municipality, in 2010, was 2.16%.

The historical population is given in the following chart:

== Politics ==
In the 2007 federal election the most popular party was the SPS which received 43.57% of the vote. The next three most popular parties were the CVP (22.05%), the CVP (22.05%) and the CSP (8.14%). In the federal election, a total of 192 votes were cast, and the voter turnout was 44.1%.

== Economy ==
As of 2010, Mervelier had an unemployment rate of 3.1%. As of 2008, there were 26 people employed in the primary economic sector and about 13 businesses involved in this sector. 48 people were employed in the secondary sector and there were 8 businesses in this sector. 23 people were employed in the tertiary sector, with 12 businesses in this sector. There were 253 residents of the municipality who were employed in some capacity, of which females made up 41.5% of the workforce.

In 2008 the total number of full-time equivalent jobs was 75. The number of jobs in the primary sector was 19, all of which were in agriculture. The number of jobs in the secondary sector was 41 of which 25 or (61.0%) were in manufacturing and 16 (39.0%) were in construction. The number of jobs in the tertiary sector was 15. In the tertiary sector; 4 or 26.7% were in wholesale or retail sales or the repair of motor vehicles, 5 or 33.3% were in the movement and storage of goods, 2 or 13.3% were in a hotel or restaurant, 3 or 20.0% were in education.

In 2000, there were 20 workers who commuted into the municipality and 197 workers who commuted away. The municipality is a net exporter of workers, with about 9.9 workers leaving the municipality for every one entering. Of the working population, 13.8% used public transportation to get to work, and 70% used a private car.

== Religion ==
From the 2000 census, 472 or 80.7% were Roman Catholic, while 54 or 9.2% belonged to the Swiss Reformed Church. Of the rest of the population, there were 2 members of an Orthodox church (or about 0.34% of the population), and there were 3 individuals (or about 0.51% of the population) who belonged to another Christian church. 39 (or about 6.67% of the population) belonged to no church, are agnostic or atheist, and 16 individuals (or about 2.74% of the population) did not answer the question.

== Weather ==
Mervelier has an average of 144.8 days of rain or snow per year and on average receives 1,184 mm (46.6 in) of precipitation. The wettest month is June during which time Mervelier receives an average of 139 mm (5.5 in) of rain or snow. During this month there is precipitation for an average of 13.1 days. The month with the most days of precipitation is May, with an average of 14.7, but with only 121 mm (4.8 in) of rain or snow. The driest month of the year is February with an average of 76 mm (3.0 in) of precipitation over 12 days.

== Education ==
In Mervelier about 203 or (34.7%) of the population have completed non-mandatory upper secondary education, and 35 or (6.0%) have completed additional higher education (either university or a Fachhochschule). Of the 35 who completed tertiary schooling, 80.0% were Swiss men, 17.1% were Swiss women.

The Canton of Jura school system provides two year of non-obligatory Kindergarten, followed by six years of Primary school. This is followed by three years of obligatory lower Secondary school where the students are separated according to ability and aptitude. Following the lower Secondary students may attend a three or four year optional upper Secondary school followed by some form of Tertiary school or they may enter an apprenticeship.

During the 2009-10 school year, there were a total of 34 students attending 3 classes in Mervelier. There were no kindergarten classes in the municipality. The municipality had 2.5 primary classes and 34 students. There are only nine Secondary schools in the canton, so all the students from Mervelier attend their secondary school in another municipality.

As of 2000, there were 4 students in Mervelier who came from another municipality, while 49 residents attended schools outside the municipality.
