= Siegfried Lefanczik =

German racewalker (1930–2016)

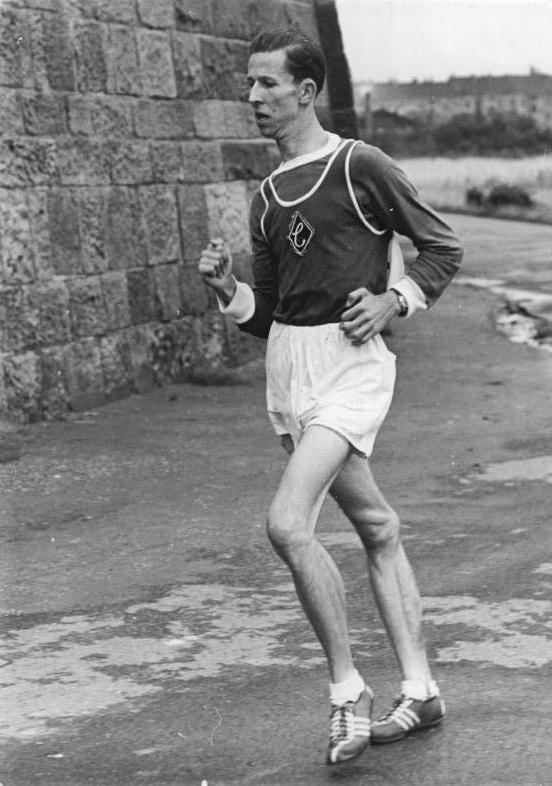
- Siegfried Lefanczik in 1956

Personal information
- Nationality: German
- Born: 4 July 1930
- Died: February 2016 (aged 85)

Sport
- Sport: Athletics
- Event: Racewalking

Siegfried Lefanczik (4 July 1930 – February 2016) was a German racewalker. He competed in the 1958 European Athletics Championships and placed 7th out of 598 competitors. He later competed in the men's 20 kilometres walk at the 1960 Summer Olympics but was disqualified only 3 km (1.86 mi) from the finish line.
