= Rudy Haluza =

American racewalker (1931–2021)

Rudolph John Haluza (July 5, 1931 – September 27, 2021) was an American racewalker who competed in the 1960 Summer Olympics and in the 1968 Summer Olympics. Haluza competed in two Olympics in the 20 km walk, placing 24th in 1960 and almost winning a medal in 1968 when he finished fourth. He was born in Middletown, New York. He grew up in Queens and after college entered the Air Force and became a pilot for United Airlines.
