= Vicques, Switzerland =

Vicques
- Former municipality
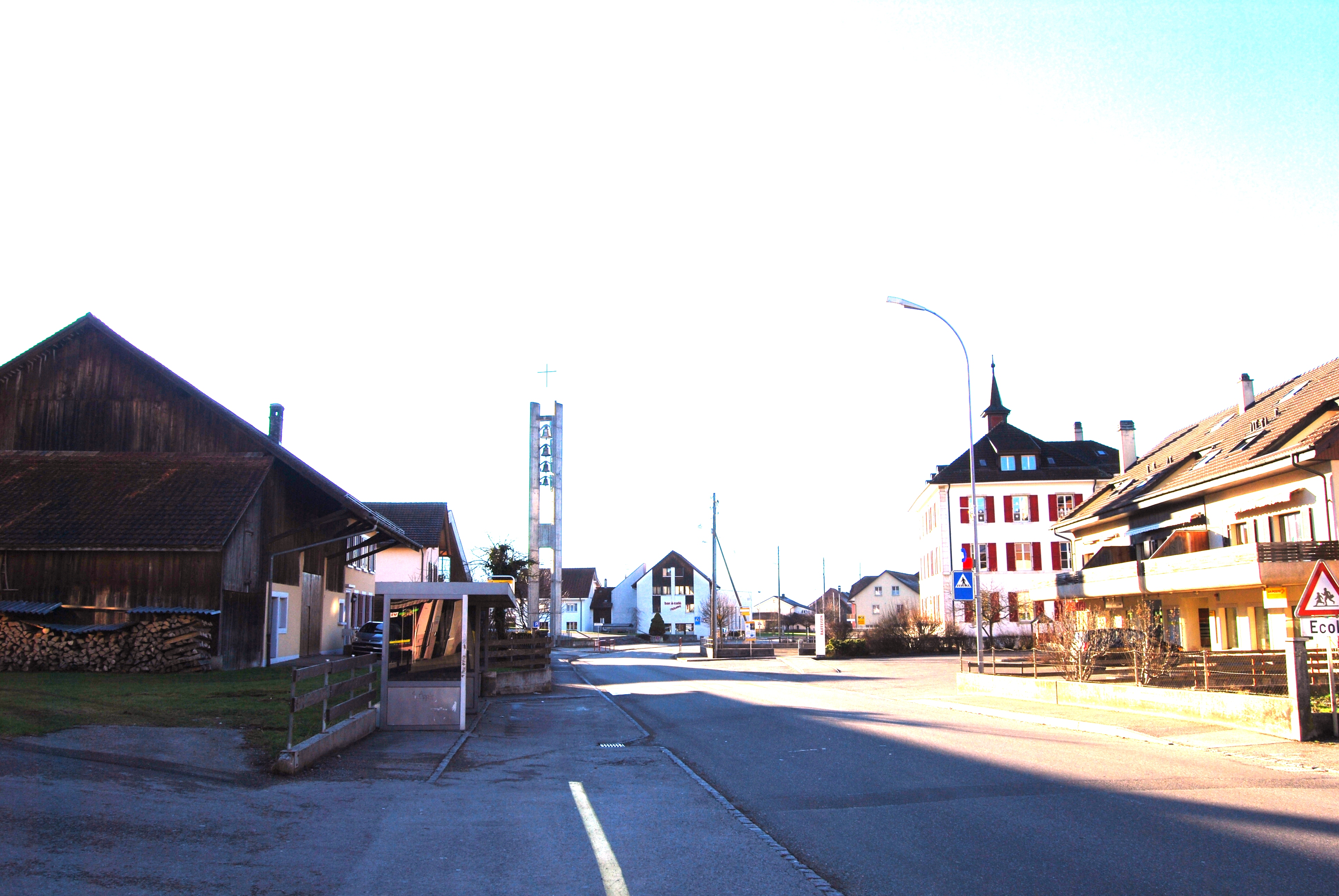
- Vicques village

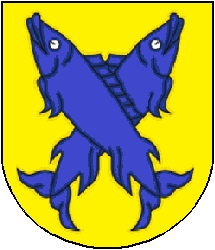
- Coat of arms
- Location of Vicques
- Location within Switzerland Location within Canton of Jura
- Coordinates: 47°21′N 07°25′E
- Country: Switzerland
- Canton: Jura
- District: Delémont

Government
  - Mayor: Suzanne Maître

Area
  - Total: 12.75 km^{2} (4.92 sq mi)
- Elevation: 455 m (1,493 ft)

Population (Dec 2011)
  - Total: 1,763
  - Density: 138.3/km^{2} (358.1/sq mi)
- Demonym: Vicquois
- Time zone: UTC+01:00 (CET)
  - Summer (DST): UTC+02:00 (CEST)
- Postal code: 2824
- SFOS number: 6727
- ISO 3166 code: CH-JU
- Localities: Recolaine
- Surrounded by: Courchapoix, Vermes, Rebeuvelier, Courroux, Bärschwil(SO)
- Website: www.vicques.ch

Vicques (French pronunciation: [vik]; formerly German: Wix) is a former municipality in the district of Delémont in the canton of Jura in Switzerland. The municipalities of Montsevelier, Vermes and Vicques merged on 1 January 2013 into the new municipality of Val Terbi.

Jura Observatory is located above Vicques.

== History ==
Aerial view (1955)

Vicques is first mentioned in 866 as Vicum.

== Geography ==
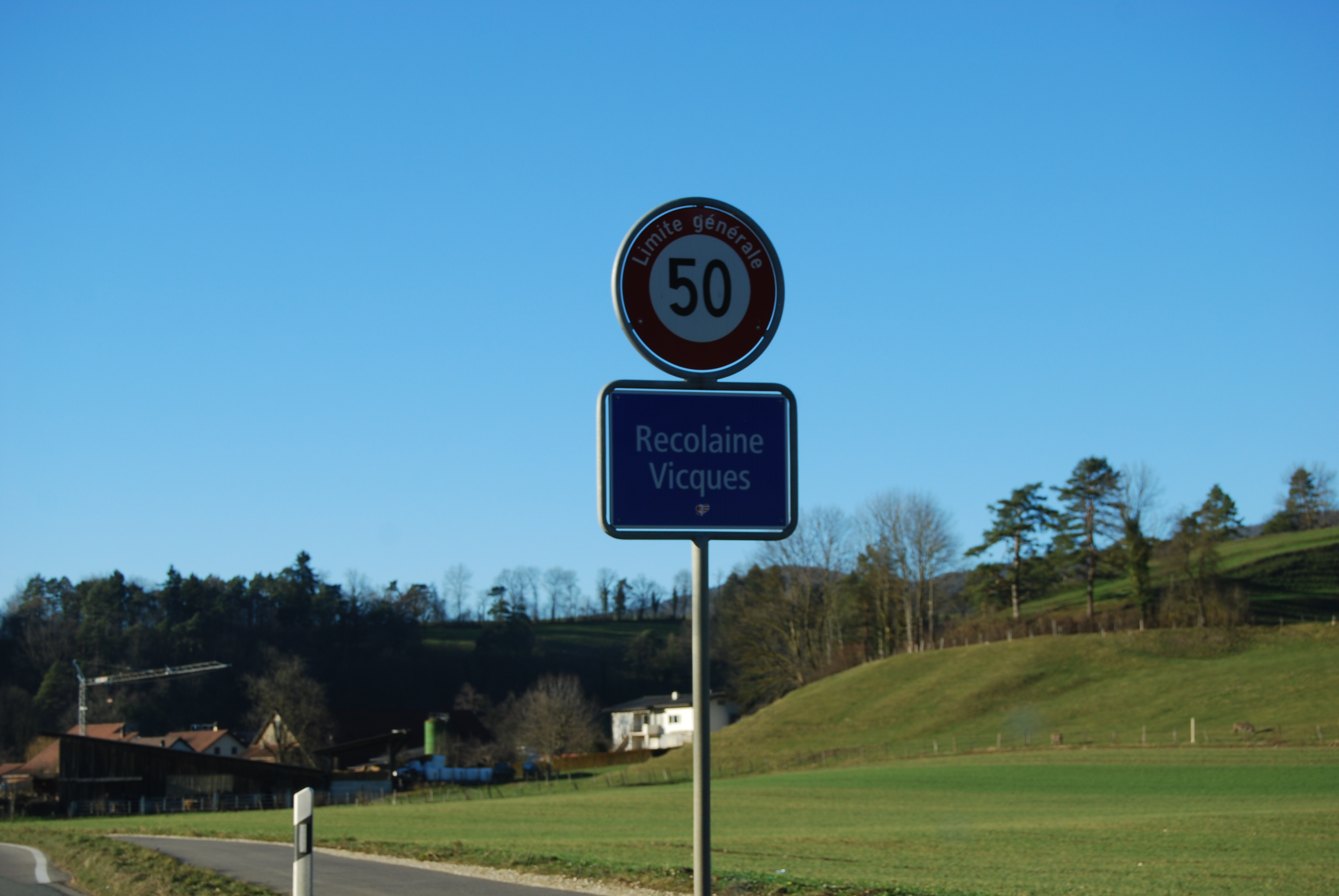
Border of the municipality

Vicques had an area of 12.77 km^{2} (4.93 sq mi). Of this area, 5.9 km^{2} (2.3 mi^{2}) or 46.2% is used for agricultural purposes, while 5.86 km^{2} (2.26 mi^{2}) or 45.9% is forested. Of the rest of the land, 0.92 km^{2} (0.36 mi^{2}) or 7.2% is settled (buildings or roads), 0.08 km^{2} (20 acres) or 0.6% is either rivers or lakes and 0.03 km^{2} (7.4 acres) or 0.2% is unproductive land.

Of the built up area, housing and buildings made up 4.2% and transportation infrastructure made up 2.3%. Out of the forested land, 42.8% of the total land area is heavily forested and 3.1% is covered with orchards or small clusters of trees. Of the agricultural land, 23.0% is used for growing crops and 12.4% is pastures and 10.4% is used for alpine pastures. All the water in the municipality is flowing water.

The former municipality is located in the Delemont district, in the Val Terbi.

== Coat of arms ==
The blazon of the municipal coat of arms is Or, two Fishes Azure in saltire.

== Demographics ==
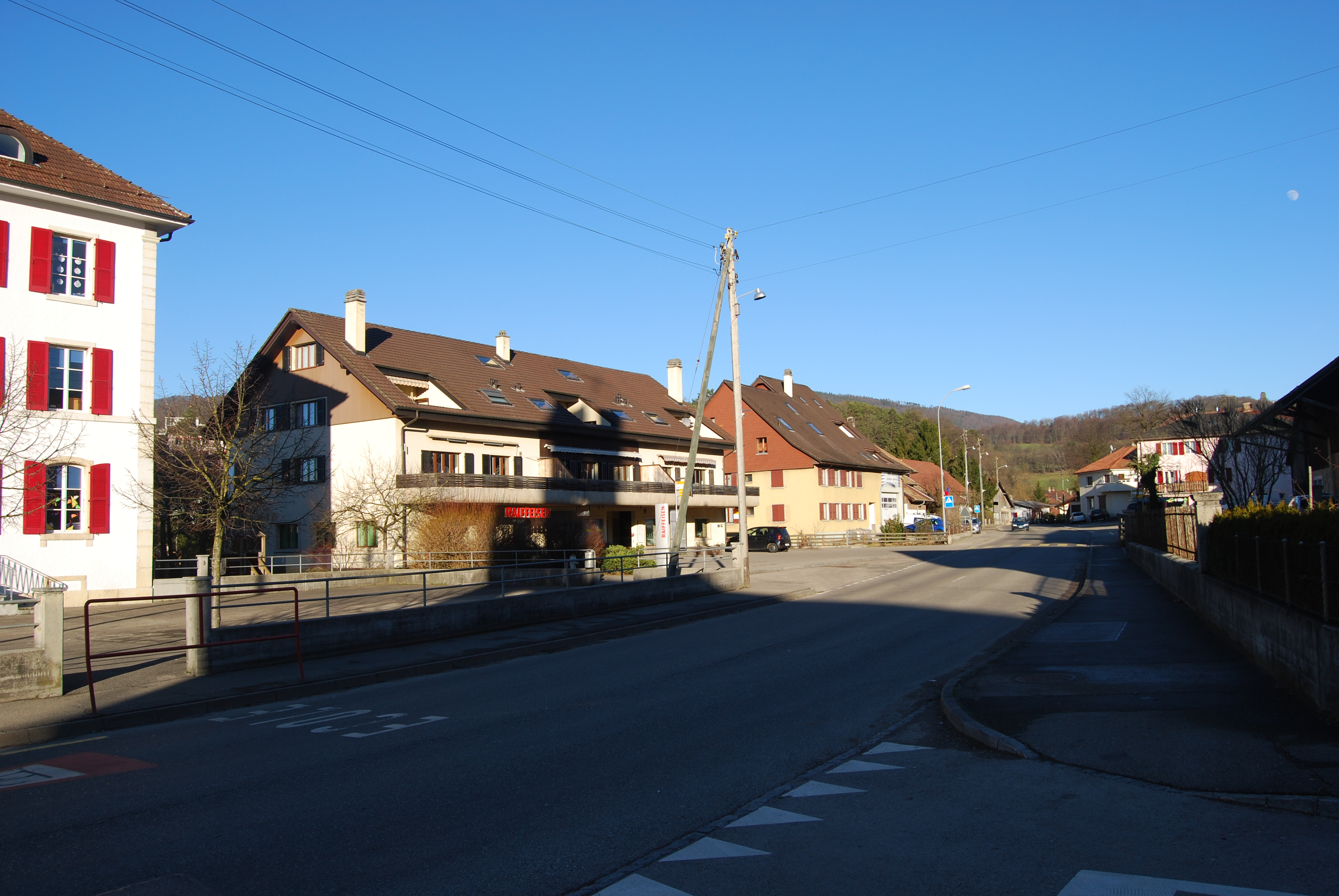
Houses in Vicques

Vicques had a population (as of 2011) of 1,763. As of 2008, 8.1% of the population are resident foreign nationals. Over the last 10 years (2000–2010) the population has changed at a rate of 7.6%. Migration accounted for -1.7%, while births and deaths accounted for 5.9%.

Most of the population (as of 2000) speaks French (1,508 or 93.8%) as their first language, German is the second most common (53 or 3.3%) and Italian is the third (15 or 0.9%).

As of 2008, the population was 51.3% male and 48.7% female. The population was made up of 808 Swiss men (46.5% of the population) and 84 (4.8%) non-Swiss men. There were 790 Swiss women (45.4%) and 57 (3.3%) non-Swiss women. Of the population in the municipality, 650 or about 40.4% were born in Vicques and lived there in 2000. There were 582 or 36.2% who were born in the same canton, while 207 or 12.9% were born somewhere else in Switzerland, and 122 or 7.6% were born outside of Switzerland.

As of 2000, children and teenagers (0–19 years old) make up 27.2% of the population, while adults (20–64 years old) make up 60.3% and seniors (over 64 years old) make up 12.4%.

As of 2000, there were 656 people who were single and never married in the municipality. There were 832 married individuals, 83 widows or widowers and 37 individuals who are divorced.

As of 2000, there were 569 private households in the municipality, and an average of 2.7 persons per household. There were 103 households that consist of only one person and 65 households with five or more people. In 2000, a total of 555 apartments (92.5% of the total) were permanently occupied, while 31 apartments (5.2%) were seasonally occupied and 14 apartments (2.3%) were empty. As of 2009, the construction rate of new housing units was 2.9 new units per 1000 residents. The vacancy rate for the municipality, in 2010, was 0.6%.

The historical population is given in the following chart:

== Politics ==
In the 2007 federal election the most popular party was the SPS which received 49.63% of the vote. The next three most popular parties were the CVP (19.7%), the CSP (15.34%) and the SVP (11.5%). In the federal election, a total of 479 votes were cast, and the voter turnout was 38.3%.

== Economy ==
As of 2010, Vicques had an unemployment rate of 4%. As of 2008, there were 56 people employed in the primary economic sector and about 20 businesses involved in this sector. 180 people were employed in the secondary sector and there were 24 businesses in this sector. 259 people were employed in the tertiary sector, with 46 businesses in this sector. There were 800 residents of the municipality who were employed in some capacity, of which females made up 41.9% of the workforce.

In 2008 the total number of full-time equivalent jobs was 402. The number of jobs in the primary sector was 43, of which 36 were in agriculture and 6 were in forestry or lumber production. The number of jobs in the secondary sector was 172 of which 122 or (70.9%) were in manufacturing and 50 (29.1%) were in construction. The number of jobs in the tertiary sector was 187. In the tertiary sector; 59 or 31.6% were in wholesale or retail sales or the repair of motor vehicles, 9 or 4.8% were in the movement and storage of goods, 8 or 4.3% were in a hotel or restaurant, 10 or 5.3% were the insurance or financial industry, 4 or 2.1% were technical professionals or scientists, 35 or 18.7% were in education and 45 or 24.1% were in health care.

In 2000, there were 222 workers who commuted into the municipality and 569 workers who commuted away. The municipality is a net exporter of workers, with about 2.6 workers leaving the municipality for every one entering. About 3.6% of the workforce coming into Vicques are coming from outside Switzerland. Of the working population, 13.4% used public transportation to get to work, and 65.8% used a private car.

== Religion ==
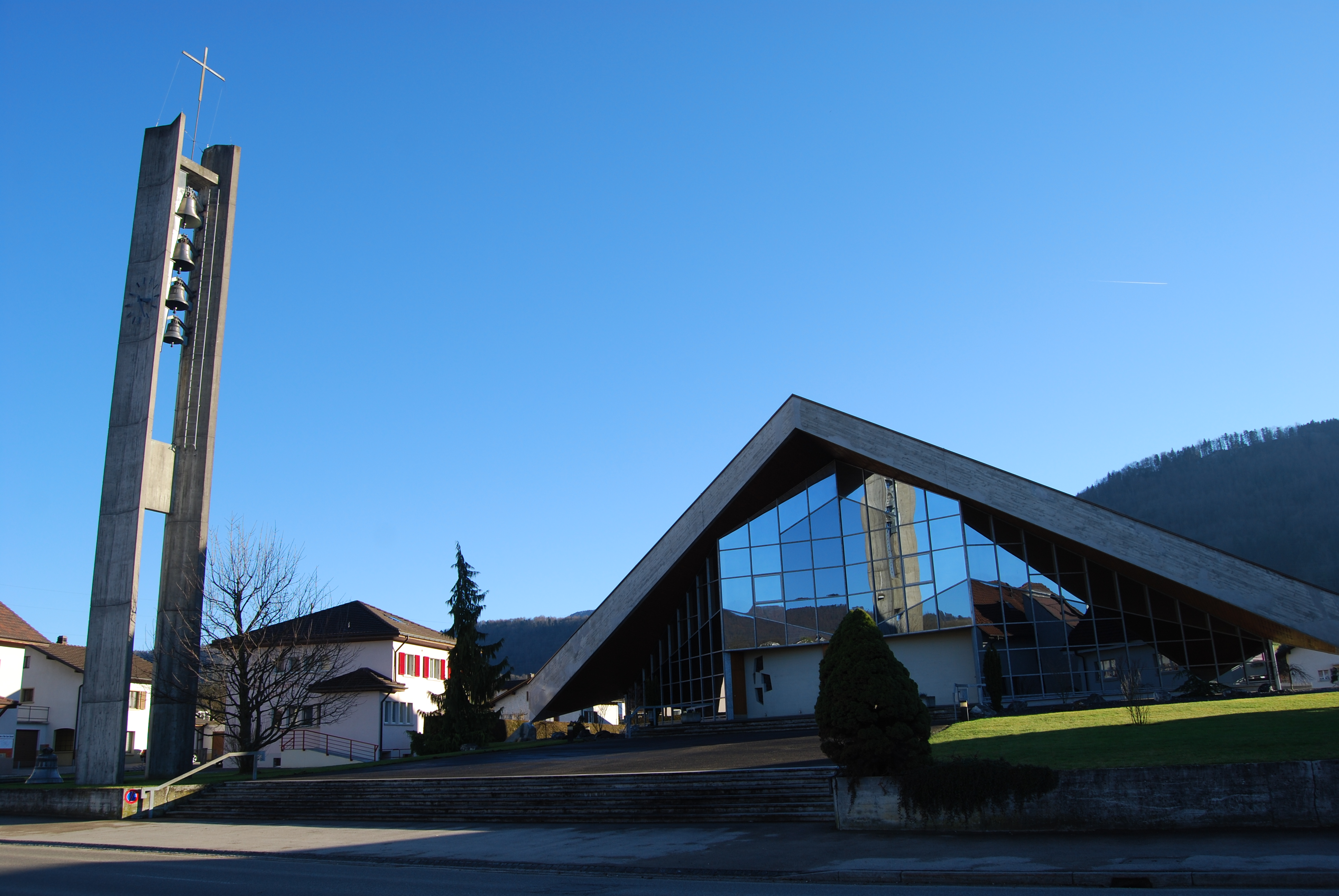
Church in Vicques

From the 2000 census, 1,308 or 81.3% were Roman Catholic, while 151 or 9.4% belonged to the Swiss Reformed Church. Of the rest of the population, there was 1 member of an Orthodox church, there were 3 individuals (or about 0.19% of the population) who belonged to the Christian Catholic Church, and there were 46 individuals (or about 2.86% of the population) who belonged to another Christian church. There were 10 (or about 0.62% of the population) who were Islamic. There were 2 individuals who belonged to another church. 70 (or about 4.35% of the population) belonged to no church, are agnostic or atheist, and 40 individuals (or about 2.49% of the population) did not answer the question.

== Education ==
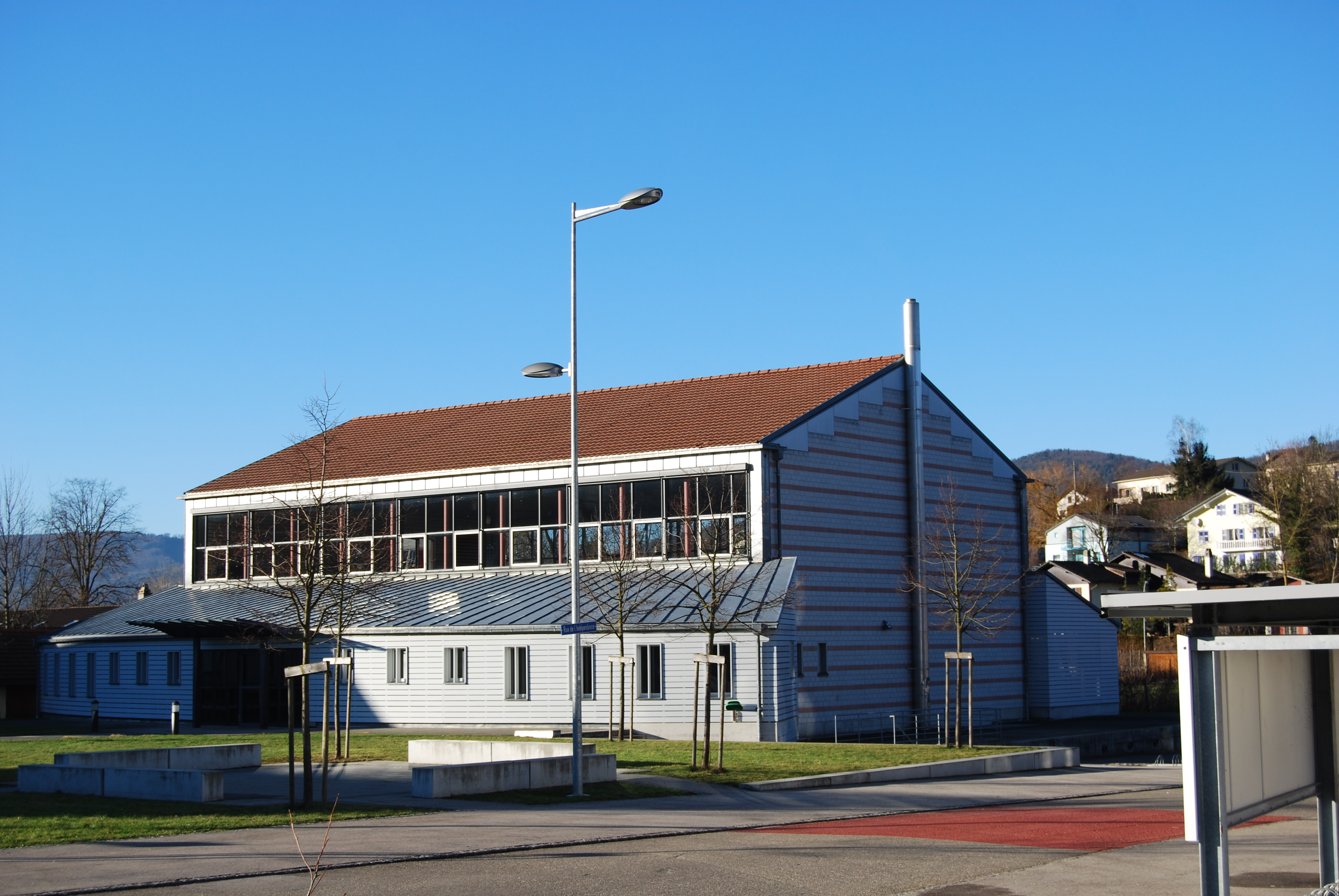
Sport building in Vicques

In Vicques about 584 or (36.3%) of the population have completed non-mandatory upper secondary education, and 123 or (7.6%) have completed additional higher education (either university or a Fachhochschule). Of the 123 who completed tertiary schooling, 64.2% were Swiss men, 26.0% were Swiss women, 6.5% were non-Swiss men.

The Canton of Jura school system provides two year of non-obligatory Kindergarten, followed by six years of Primary school. This is followed by three years of obligatory lower Secondary school where the students are separated according to ability and aptitude. Following the lower Secondary students may attend a three or four year optional upper Secondary school followed by some form of Tertiary school or they may enter an apprenticeship.

During the 2009-10 school year, there were a total of 486 students attending 27 classes in Vicques. There were 2.5 kindergarten classes with a total of 46 students in the municipality. The municipality had 9 primary classes and 160 students. During the same year, there were 15 lower secondary classes with a total of 280 students.

As of 2000, there were 216 students in Vicques who came from another municipality, while 58 residents attended schools outside the municipality.
