= Lennart Back =

Swedish racewalker (1933–2022)

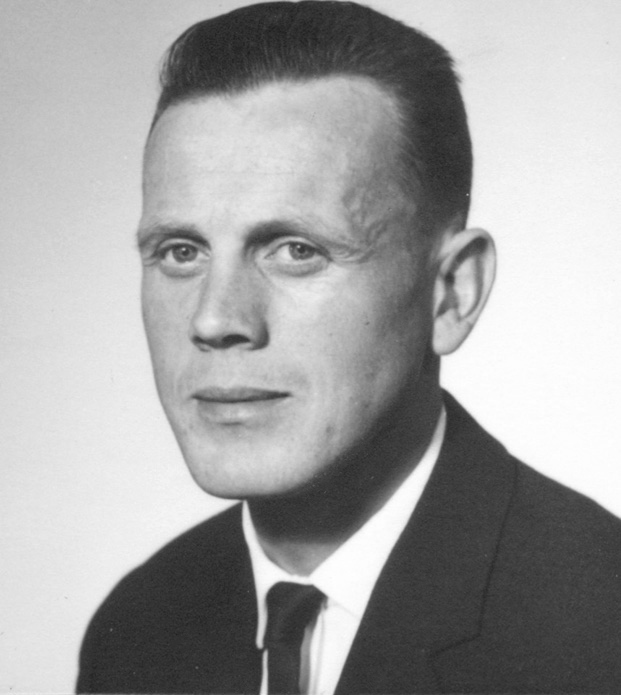
- Back circa 1960

Personal information
- Born: 28 May 1933 Ellenö, Färgelanda, Sweden
- Died: 1 August 2022 (aged 89)
- Height: 180 cm (5 ft 11 in)
- Weight: 68 kg (150 lb)

Sport
- Sport: Racewalking
- Event: 20 km walk
- Club: Uddevalla Cykelamatörer

Achievements and titles
- Personal best: 1:31:13 (1962)
Medal record
Men's athletics
Representing Sweden
European Championships
Bronze medal – third place	1958 Stockholm	20 km walk

Torsten Lennart Back (28 May 1933 – 1 August 2022) was a Swedish race walker. He won a bronze medal in the 20 km event at the 1958 European Championships and finished sixth at the 1960 Summer Olympics.

He was the silver medallist at the inaugural 1961 IAAF World Race Walking Cup and represented Sweden again at that competition in 1963, 1965 and 1970 (though not winning a medal those times).
