= Municipalities of the canton of Solothurn =

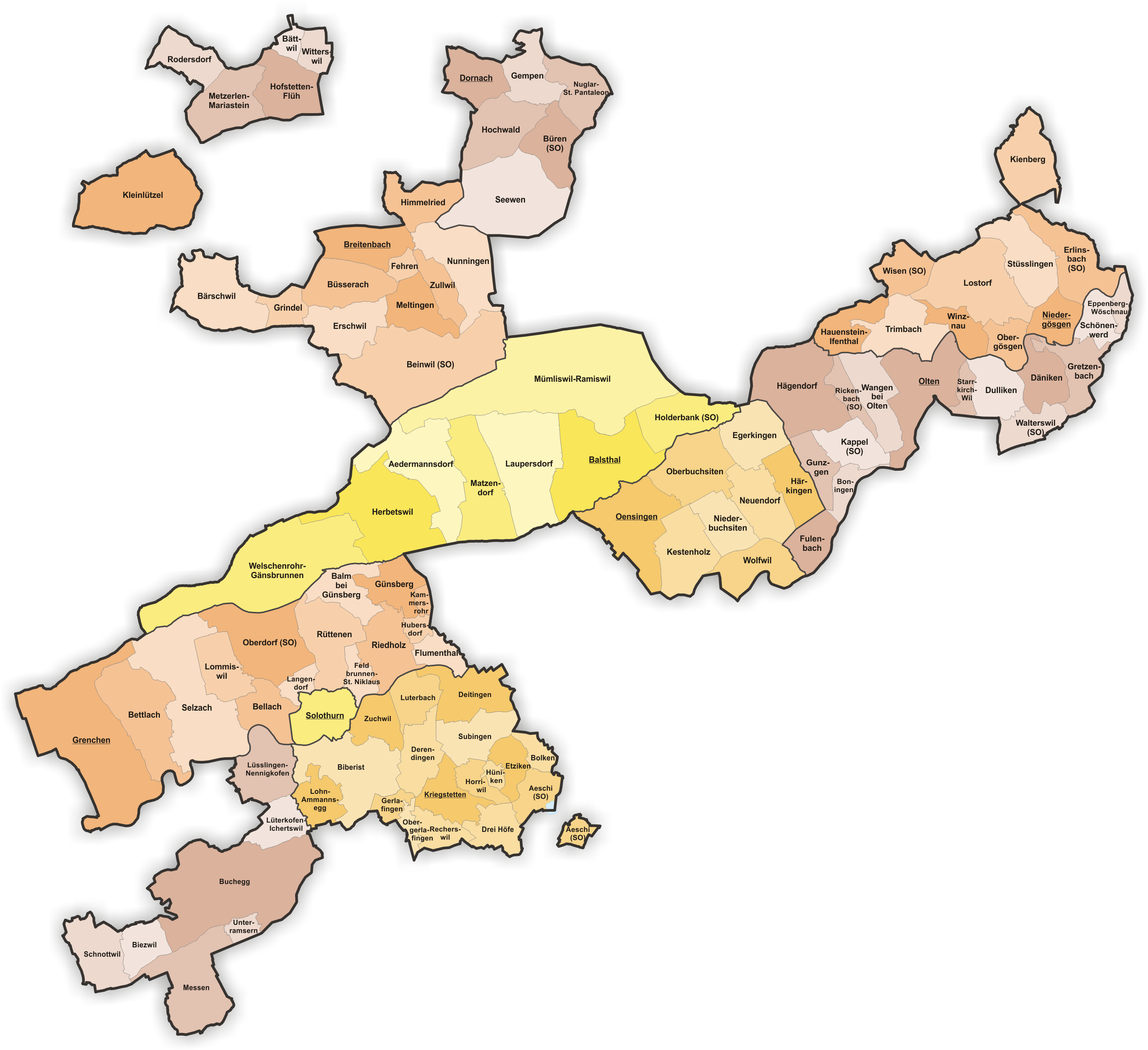
Municipalities in the canton of Solothurn

These are the 104 municipalities of the canton of Solothurn, Switzerland (as of January 2026).

== List ==
- Aedermannsdorf
- Aeschi (SO)
- Balm bei Günsberg
- Balsthal
- Bärschwil
- Bättwil
- Beinwil (SO)
- Bellach
- Bettlach
- Biberist
- Biezwil
- Bolken
- Boningen
- Breitenbach
- Buchegg
- Büren (SO)
- Büsserach
- Däniken
- Deitingen
- Derendingen
- Dornach
- Drei Höfe
- Dulliken
- Egerkingen
- Eppenberg-Wöschnau
- Erlinsbach (SO)
- Erschwil
- Etziken
- Fehren
- Feldbrunnen-St. Niklaus
- Flumenthal
- Fulenbach
- Gempen
- Gerlafingen
- Grenchen
- Gretzenbach
- Grindel
- Günsberg
- Gunzgen
- Hägendorf
- Härkingen
- Hauenstein-Ifenthal
- Herbetswil
- Himmelried
- Hochwald
- Hofstetten-Flüh
- Holderbank (SO)
- Horriwil
- Hubersdorf
- Hüniken
- Kammersrohr
- Kappel (SO)
- Kestenholz
- Kienberg
- Kleinlützel
- Kriegstetten
- Langendorf
- Laupersdorf
- Lohn-Ammannsegg
- Lommiswil
- Lostorf
- Lüsslingen-Nennigkofen
- Luterbach
- Lüterkofen-Ichertswil
- Matzendorf
- Meltingen
- Messen
- Metzerlen-Mariastein
- Mümliswil-Ramiswil
- Neuendorf
- Niederbuchsiten
- Niedergösgen
- Nuglar-St. Pantaleon
- Nunningen
- Oberbuchsiten
- Oberdorf (SO)
- Obergerlafingen
- Obergösgen
- Oensingen
- Olten
- Recherswil
- Rickenbach (SO)
- Riedholz
- Rodersdorf
- Rüttenen
- Schnottwil
- Schönenwerd
- Seewen
- Selzach
- Solothurn
- Starrkirch-Wil
- Stüsslingen
- Subingen
- Trimbach
- Unterramsern
- Walterswil (SO)
- Wangen bei Olten
- Welschenrohr-Gänsbrunnen
- Winznau
- Wisen (SO)
- Witterswil
- Wolfwil
- Zuchwil
- Zullwil
