= Thierstein District =

District of Solothurn canton, Switzerland

Coordinates: 47°24′30″N 7°32′40″E

Thierstein District is one of the ten districts of the canton of Solothurn in Switzerland, situated to the north of the canton. Together with the Dorneck District, it forms the Amtei (electoral district) of Dorneck-Thierstein. It has a population of 14,802 (as of 31 December 2020).

== Municipalities ==
Thierstein District contains twelve municipalities, with Kleinlützel existing as an exclave.

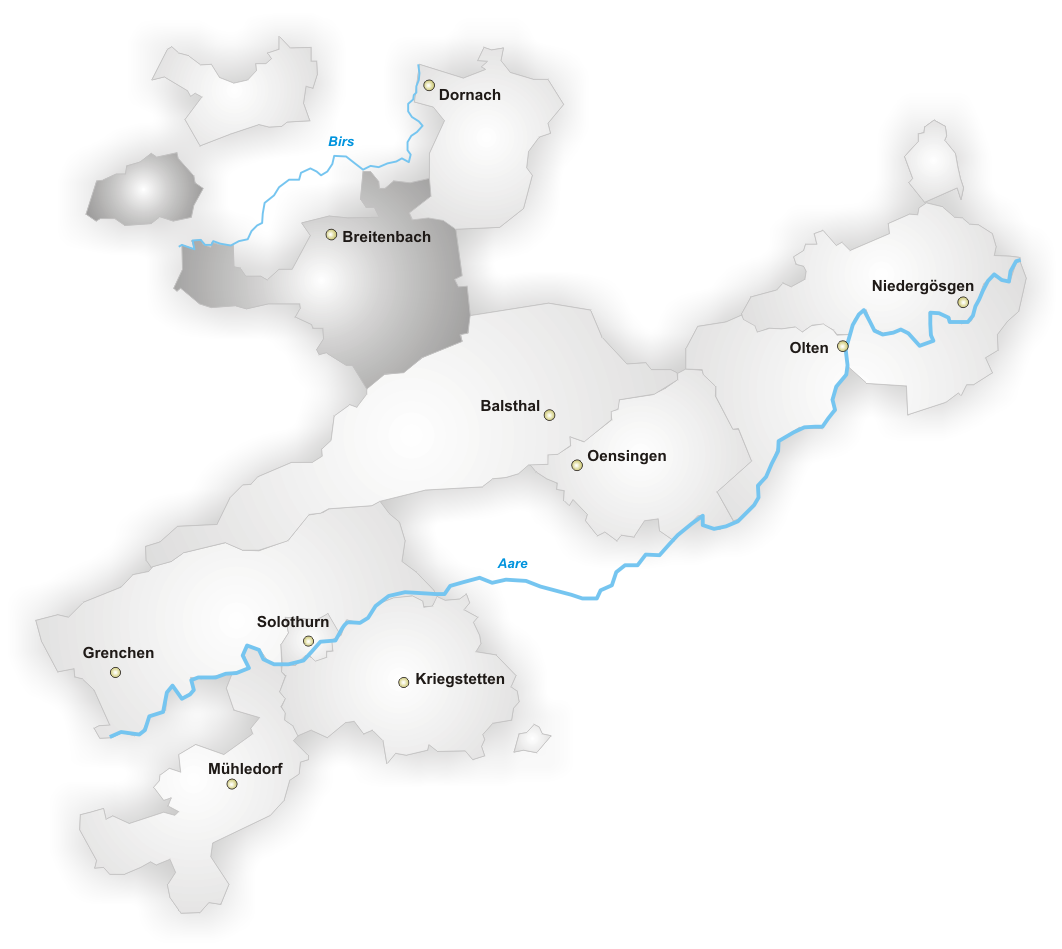
Thierstein District, canton of Solothurn

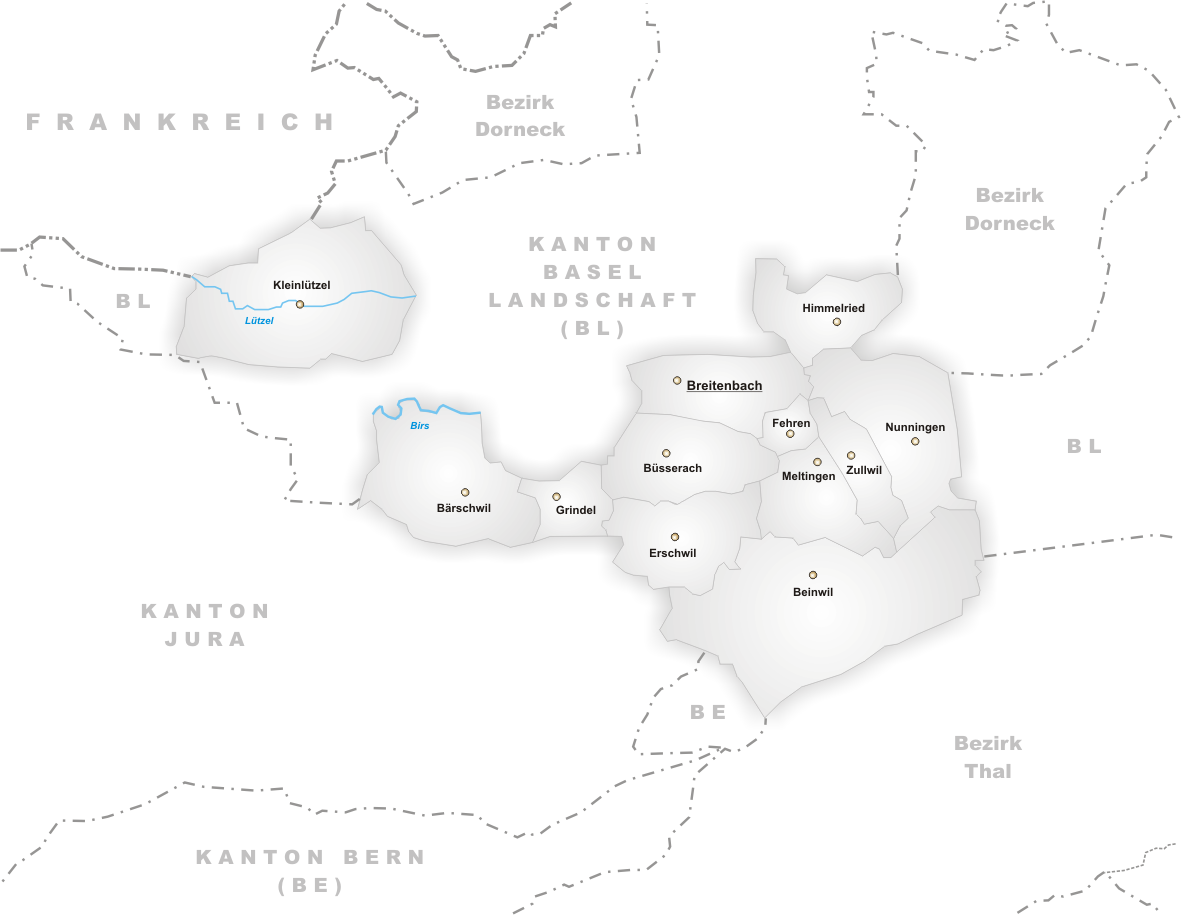
Municipalities of Thierstein

Coat of arms	Municipality	Population (31 December 2020)	Area, km^{2}
Bärschwil	Bärschwil	803	11.20
Beinwil SO	Beinwil	274	22.67
Breitenbach	Breitenbach	3,979	6.83
Büsserach	Büsserach	2,296	7.55
Erschwil	Erschwil	948	7.48
Fehren	Fehren	595	1.50
Grindel	Grindel	502	3.05
Himmelried	Himmelried	961	6.00
Kleinlützel	Kleinlützel	1,218	16.34
Meltingen	Meltingen	655	5.76
Nunningen	Nunningen	1,914	10.27
Zullwil	Zullwil	657	3.63
	Total	14,802	102.28

== Geography ==
Thierstein has an area, as of 2009, of 102.16 square kilometers (39.44 sq mi). Of this area, 41.41 km^{2} (15.99 sq mi) or 40.5% is used for agricultural purposes, while 53.36 km^{2} (20.60 sq mi) or 52.2% is forested. Of the rest of the land, 7.04 km^{2} (2.72 sq mi) or 6.9% is settled (buildings or roads), 0.15 km^{2} (37 acres) or 0.1% is either rivers or lakes and 0.2 km^{2} (0.077 sq mi) or 0.2% is unproductive land.

Of the built up area, housing and buildings made up 4.0% and transportation infrastructure made up 2.0%. Out of the forested land, 49.3% of the total land area is heavily forested and 2.9% is covered with orchards or small clusters of trees. Of the agricultural land, 34.0% is used for growing crops, while 1.9% is used for orchards or vine crops and 4.6% is used for alpine pastures. All the water in the district is flowing water.

== Coat of arms ==
The blazon of the municipal coat of arms is Or a Doe Gules statant on a Mount of 3 Coupeaux Vert.

== Demographics ==
Thierstein has a population (as of December 2020) of 14,802.

Most of the population (as of 2000) speaks German (12,376 or 91.8%), with Italian being second most common (212 or 1.6%) and Albanian being third (176 or 1.3%). There are 119 people who speak French and 16 people who speak Romansh.

As of 2008, the gender distribution of the population was 50.3% male and 49.7% female. The population was made up of 6,104 Swiss men (43.8% of the population) and 909 (6.5%) non-Swiss men. There were 6,169 Swiss women (44.3%) and 749 (5.4%) non-Swiss women. Of the population in the district 5,617 or about 41.7% were born in Thierstein and lived there in 2000. There were 2,278 or 16.9% who were born in the same canton, while 3,695 or 27.4% were born somewhere else in Switzerland, and 1,621 or 12.0% were born outside of Switzerland.

In 2008 there were 98 live births to Swiss citizens and 16 births to non-Swiss citizens, and in same time span there were 132 deaths of Swiss citizens and 6 non-Swiss citizen deaths. Ignoring immigration and emigration, the population of Swiss citizens decreased by 34 while the foreign population increased by 10. There were 12 Swiss men and 2 Swiss women who immigrated back to Switzerland. At the same time, there were 25 non-Swiss men and 21 non-Swiss women who immigrated from another country to Switzerland. The total Swiss population change in 2008 (from all sources, including moves across municipal borders) was a decrease of 28 and the non-Swiss population increased by 7 people. This represents a population growth rate of -0.2%.

As of 2000, there were 5,487 people who were single and never married in the district. There were 6,736 married individuals, 783 widows or widowers and 477 individuals who are divorced.

There were 1,350 households that consist of only one person and 430 households with five or more people. Out of a total of 5,324 households that answered this question, 25.4% were households made up of just one person and 70 were adults who lived with their parents. Of the rest of the households, there are 1,574 married couples without children, 1,949 married couples with children There were 229 single parents with a child or children. There were 81 households that were made up unrelated people and 71 households that were made some sort of institution or another collective housing.

The historical population is given in the following chart:

== Politics ==
In the 2007 federal election the most popular party was the FDP which received 30.48% of the vote. The next three most popular parties were the SVP (26.61%), the CVP (23%) and the SP (10.94%). In the federal election, a total of 4,872 votes were cast, and the voter turnout was 48.9%.

== Religion ==
From the 2000 census, 9,494 or 70.4% were Roman Catholic, while 1,619 or 12.0% belonged to the Swiss Reformed Church. Of the rest of the population, there were 132 members of an Orthodox church (or about 0.98% of the population), there were 42 individuals (or about 0.31% of the population) who belonged to the Christian Catholic Church, and there were 147 individuals (or about 1.09% of the population) who belonged to another Christian church. There were 6 individuals (or about 0.04% of the population) who were Jewish, and 275 (or about 2.04% of the population) who were Islamic. There were 20 individuals who were Buddhist, 21 individuals who were Hindu and 10 individuals who belonged to another church. 1,407 (or about 10.44% of the population) belonged to no church, are agnostic or atheist, and 310 individuals (or about 2.30% of the population) did not answer the question.

== Education ==
In Thierstein about 5,004 or (37.1%) of the population have completed non-mandatory upper secondary education, and 1,149 or (8.5%) have completed additional higher education (either University or a Fachhochschule). Of the 1,149 who completed tertiary schooling, 68.8% were Swiss men, 21.8% were Swiss women, 5.8% were non-Swiss men and 3.7% were non-Swiss women.

During the 2010–2011 school year there were a total of 303 students in the Thierstein district school system. The education system in the Canton of Solothurn allows young children to attend two years of non-obligatory Kindergarten. During that school year, there were no children in kindergarten. The canton's school system requires students to attend six years of primary school, with some of the children attending smaller, specialized classes. In the district there were no students in primary school and 21 students in the special, smaller classes. The secondary school program consists of three lower, obligatory years of schooling, followed by three to five years of optional, advanced schools. 282 lower secondary students attend the district school of Thierstein.
