= Bärschwil gypsum railway =

Railway line in Solothurn, Switzerland

Service
- Type: Horse drawn railway

History
- Opened: 1894
- Closed: 1952

Technical
- Track length: 2.57 km (1.60 mi)
- Track gauge: 600 mm (1 ft 11 5/8 in)

The Bärschwil gypsum railway (German: Gipsbahn Bärschwil) was a narrow gauge railway in the Swiss canton of Solothurn. It existed from 1894 to 1952, carrying gypsum from mines in the village of Bärschwil to that village's former railway station some distance away on the Jura railway line.

The mines have now been closed and filled in, but some of the line's route through the village can be identified. Between the village and the station, much of the line's right of way is now occupied by a geologically themed hiking trail, which also crosses the four span metal girder bridge that is the line's main surviving relic.

== History ==
From the 19th century, Bärschwil was a source of gypsum. Initially the gypsum was extracted on the surface, but subsequently using underground mines accessed via adits. Until 1910, the mine was situated at Gupf, and when that was exhausted a new mine was opened at Kirchacker.

At first the gypsum was removed using horse and cart. In 1875, the Jura railway line was opened to the north of the village, and in 1894 the gypsum railway was constructed to link the mines to it. The line was 2.57 kilometres (1.60 mi) long and of 600 mm (1 ft 11 5/8 in) gauge. It had a continuous downhill gradient from the mines to the station, and loaded trains were run down this by gravity. Returning empty trains were hauled up the gradient by horses.

The line continued to operate in this manner until 1952, when it was replaced by road transport. The mines closed in 1957.
