= Montsevelier =

- Former municipality
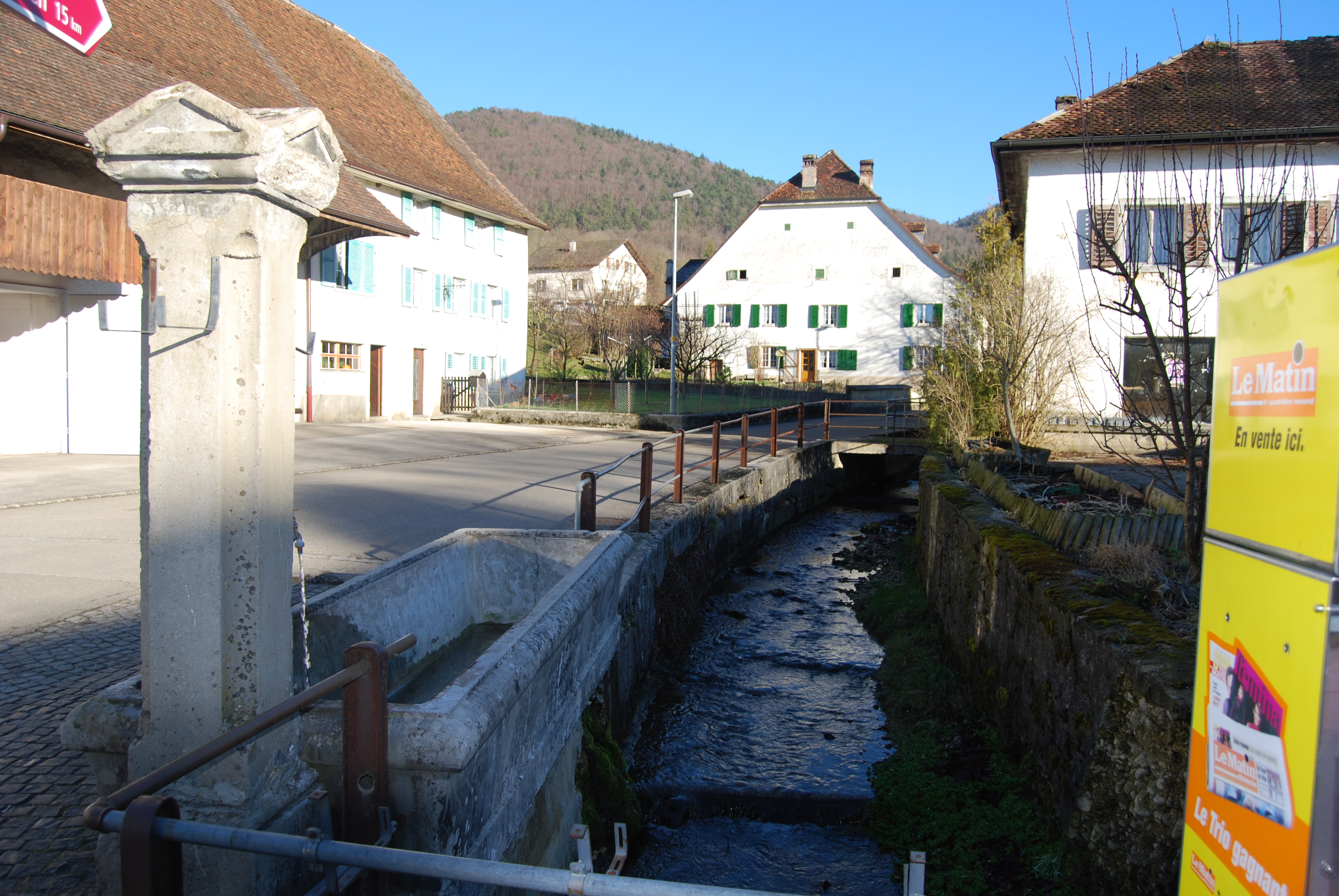
- Montsevelier river in Montsevelier village

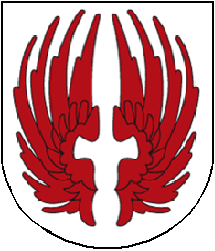
- Coat of arms
- Location of Montsevelier
- Location within Switzerland Location within Canton of Jura
- Coordinates: 47°21′N 07°30′E
- Country: Switzerland
- Canton: Jura
- District: Delémont

Area
  - Total: 7.75 km^{2} (2.99 sq mi)
- Elevation: 565 m (1,854 ft)

Population (2011)
  - Total: 508
  - Density: 65.5/km^{2} (170/sq mi)
- Time zone: UTC+01:00 (CET)
  - Summer (DST): UTC+02:00 (CEST)
- Postal code: 2828
- SFOS number: 472
- ISO 3166 code: CH-JU
- Surrounded by: Mervelier, Corban, Bärschwil(SO), Grindel(SO), Erschwil(SO), Beinwil(SO)
- Website: www.montsevelier.ch

Montsevelier (French pronunciation: [mɔ̃səv(ə)lje]) is a former municipality in the district of Delémont in the canton of Jura in Switzerland. The municipalities of Montsevelier, Vermes and Vicques merged on 1 January 2013 into the new municipality of Val Terbi.

== History ==
Montsevelier is first mentioned in 1136 as Muzivilir. The municipality was formerly known by its German name Mutzwil, however, that name is no longer used.

== Geography ==
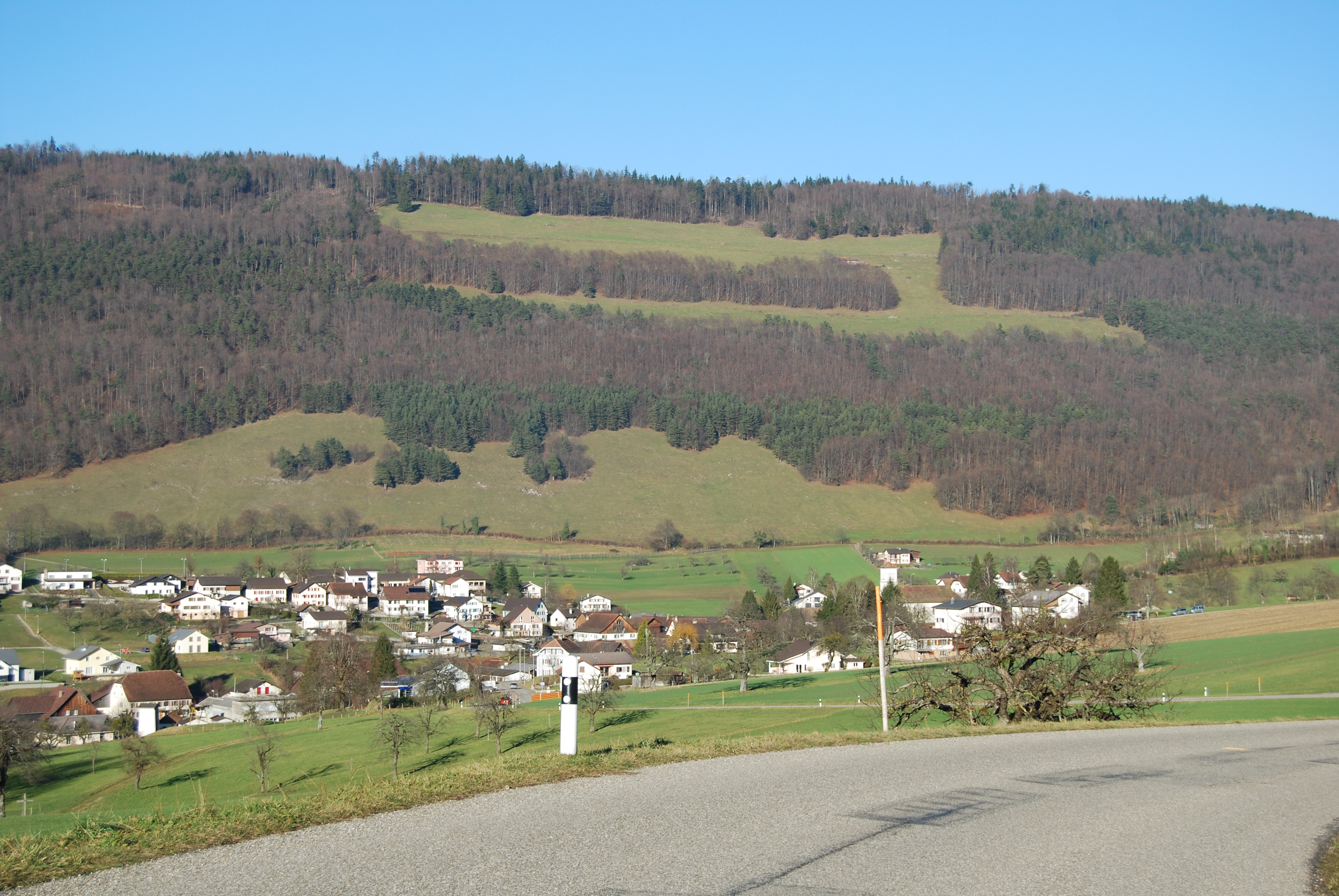
Montsevelier

Montsevelier had an area of 7.79 km^{2} (3.01 sq mi). Of this area, 3.91 km^{2} (1.51 mi^{2}) or 50.2% is used for agricultural purposes, while 3.57 km^{2} (1.38 mi^{2}) or 45.8% is forested. Of the rest of the land, 0.32 km^{2} (0.12 mi^{2}) or 4.1% is settled (buildings or roads), 0.01 km^{2} (2.5 acres) or 0.1% is either rivers or lakes.

Of the built up area, housing and buildings made up 2.4% and transportation infrastructure made up 0.9%. Out of the forested land, 43.1% of the total land area is heavily forested and 2.7% is covered with orchards or small clusters of trees. Of the agricultural land, 17.5% is used for growing crops and 20.5% is pastures, while 1.5% is used for orchards or vine crops and 10.7% is used for alpine pastures. All the water in the municipality is flowing water.

The former municipality is located in the Delemont district, in the upper most section of the Val Terbi.

== Coat of arms ==
The blazon of the municipal coat of arms is Argent, a Vol Gules.

== Demographics ==
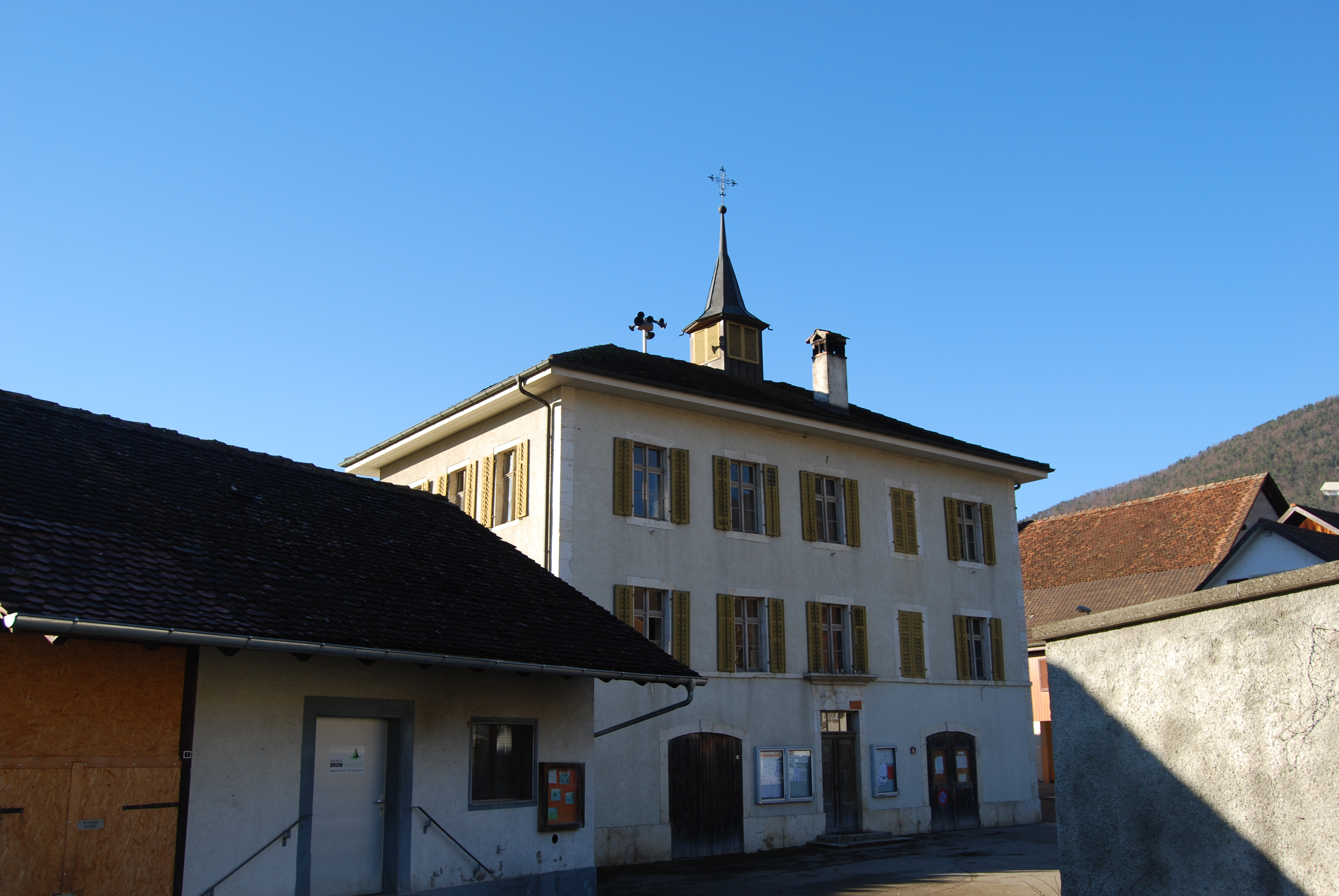
Buildings in Montsevelier

Montsevelier has a population (as of 2011) of 508. As of 2008, 1.8% of the population are resident foreign nationals. Over the last 10 years (2000–2010) the population has changed at a rate of -4.9%. Migration accounted for -6.4%, while births and deaths accounted for -0.2%.

Most of the population (as of 2000) speaks French (484 or 96.2%) as their first language, German is the second most common (16 or 3.2%) and English is the third (1 or 0.2%).

As of 2008, the population was 49.4% male and 50.6% female. The population was made up of 242 Swiss men (48.2% of the population) and 6 (1.2%) non-Swiss men. There were 250 Swiss women (49.8%) and 4 (0.8%) non-Swiss women. Of the population in the municipality, 329 or about 65.4% were born in Montsevelier and lived there in 2000. There were 101 or 20.1% who were born in the same canton, while 59 or 11.7% were born somewhere else in Switzerland, and 10 or 2.0% were born outside of Switzerland.

As of 2000, children and teenagers (0–19 years old) make up 24.3% of the population, while adults (20–64 years old) make up 59.2% and seniors (over 64 years old) make up 16.5%.

As of 2000, there were 216 people who were single and never married in the municipality. There were 251 married individuals, 24 widows or widowers and 12 individuals who are divorced.

As of 2000, there were 183 private households in the municipality, and an average of 2.7 persons per household. There were 38 households that consist of only one person and 23 households with five or more people. In 2000, a total of 179 apartments (91.8% of the total) were permanently occupied, while 11 apartments (5.6%) were seasonally occupied and 5 apartments (2.6%) were empty. As of 2009, the construction rate of new housing units was 2 new units per 1000 residents. The vacancy rate for the municipality, in 2010, was 1.4%.

The historical population is given in the following chart:

== Politics ==
In the 2007 federal election the most popular party was the CVP which received 35.66% of the vote. The next three most popular parties were the SPS (30.42%), the SVP (15.73%) and the CSP (12.24%). In the federal election, a total of 147 votes were cast, and the voter turnout was 36.8%.

== Economy ==
As of 2010, Montsevelier had an unemployment rate of 2.9%. As of 2008, there were 32 people employed in the primary economic sector and about 15 businesses involved in this sector. 36 people were employed in the secondary sector and there were 8 businesses in this sector. 25 people were employed in the tertiary sector, with 9 businesses in this sector. There were 238 residents of the municipality who were employed in some capacity, of which females made up 37.4% of the workforce.

In 2008 the total number of full-time equivalent jobs was 75. The number of jobs in the primary sector was 21, of which 20 were in agriculture and were in fishing or fisheries. The number of jobs in the secondary sector was 35 of which 32 or (91.4%) were in manufacturing and 3 (8.6%) were in construction. The number of jobs in the tertiary sector was 19. In the tertiary sector; 8 or 42.1% were in wholesale or retail sales or the repair of motor vehicles, 1 was in the movement and storage of goods, 2 or 10.5% were in the information industry, 4 or 21.1% were in education.

In 2000, there were 37 workers who commuted into the municipality and 160 workers who commuted away. The municipality is a net exporter of workers, with about 4.3 workers leaving the municipality for every one entering. Of the working population, 20.2% used public transportation to get to work, and 53.4% used a private car.

== Religion ==
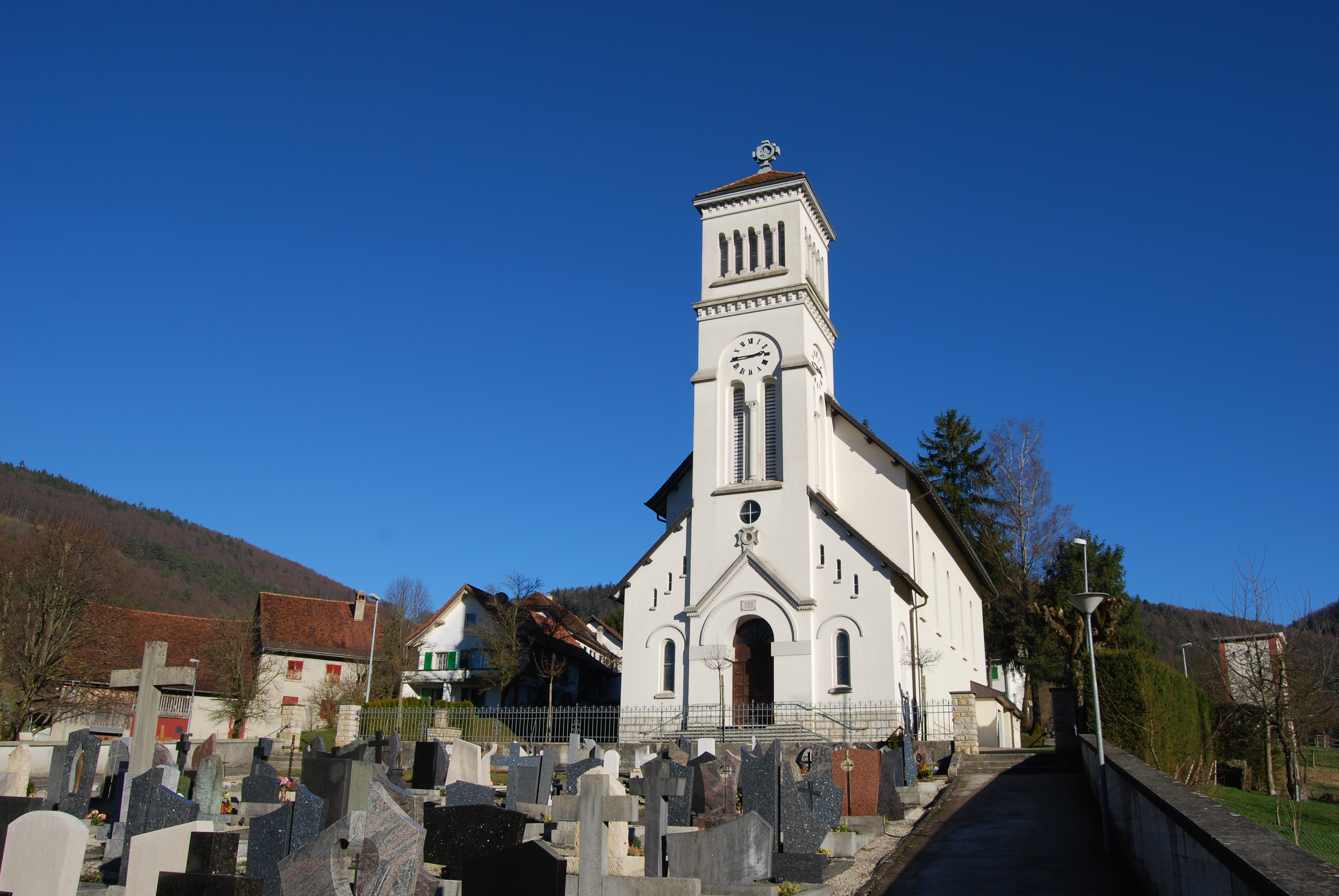
Montsevelier village church

From the 2000 census, 464 or 92.2% were Roman Catholic, while 19 or 3.8% belonged to the Swiss Reformed Church. Of the rest of the population, there was 1 individual who belongs to another Christian church. 10 (or about 1.99% of the population) belonged to no church, are agnostic or atheist, and 9 individuals (or about 1.79% of the population) did not answer the question.

== Education ==
In Montsevelier about 176 or (35.0%) of the population have completed non-mandatory upper secondary education, and 15 or (3.0%) have completed additional higher education (either university or a Fachhochschule). Of the 15 who completed tertiary schooling, 66.7% were Swiss men, 26.7% were Swiss women.

The Canton of Jura school system provides two year of non-obligatory Kindergarten, followed by six years of Primary school. This is followed by three years of obligatory lower Secondary school where the students are separated according to ability and aptitude. Following the lower Secondary students may attend a three or four year optional upper Secondary school followed by some form of Tertiary school or they may enter an apprenticeship.

During the 2009–10 school year, there were a total of 45 students attending 3 classes in Montsevelier. There were no kindergarten classes in the municipality. The municipality had 3 primary classes and 45 students. There are only nine Secondary schools in the canton, so all the students from Montsevelier attend their secondary school in another municipality.

As of 2000, there were 2 students in Montsevelier who came from another municipality, while 36 residents attended schools outside the municipality.

== Noted local individuals ==
- Sarah Marquis, adventurer
