= Meltingen =

- Municipality
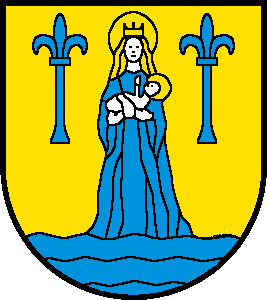
- Coat of arms
- Location of Meltingen
- Location within Switzerland Location within Canton of Solothurn
- Coordinates: 47°23′N 7°35′E
- Country: Switzerland
- Canton: Solothurn
- District: Thierstein

Area
  - Total: 5.75 km^{2} (2.22 sq mi)
- Elevation: 586 m (1,923 ft)

Population (December 2020)
  - Total: 655
  - Density: 114/km^{2} (295/sq mi)
- Time zone: UTC+01:00 (CET)
  - Summer (DST): UTC+02:00 (CEST)
- Postal code: 4233
- SFOS number: 2620
- ISO 3166 code: CH-SO
- Surrounded by: Beinwil, Büsserach, Erschwil, Fehren, Nunningen, Zullwil
- Website: www.meltingen.ch

Meltingen is a municipality in the district of Thierstein in the canton of Solothurn in Switzerland.

== History ==
Meltingen is first mentioned in 1302 as Meltingen.

== Geography ==
Meltingen has an area, as of 2009, of 5.75 square kilometers (2.22 sq mi). Of this area, 2.32 km^{2} (0.90 sq mi) or 40.3% is used for agricultural purposes, while 3.11 km^{2} (1.20 sq mi) or 54.1% is forested. Of the rest of the land, 0.33 km^{2} (0.13 sq mi) or 5.7% is settled (buildings or roads).

Of the built up area, housing and buildings made up 3.7% and transportation infrastructure made up 1.4%. Out of the forested land, 50.3% of the total land area is heavily forested and 3.8% is covered with orchards or small clusters of trees. Of the agricultural land, 0.7% is used for growing crops and 30.6% is pastures, while 1.9% is used for orchards or vine crops and 7.1% is used for alpine pastures.

The municipality is located in the Thierstein district, along the upper Ibach. It consists of the village of Meltingen and a settled church hill.

== Coat of arms ==
The blazon of the municipal coat of arms is Or Madonna statant clead Azure crowned and haloed Or holding the Child clead Argent haloed Or between two Stafs fleury of the second and the base wavy of the same.

== Demographics ==
Meltingen has a population (as of December 2020) of 655. As of 2008, 4.4% of the population are resident foreign nationals. Over the last 10 years (1999–2009 ) the population has changed at a rate of 2.1%. It has changed at a rate of 4.7% due to migration and at a rate of -1.1% due to births and deaths.

Most of the population (as of 2000) speaks German (587 or 97.3%), with French being second most common (5 or 0.8%) and Italian being third (4 or 0.7%). There are 3 people who speak Romansh.

As of 2008, the gender distribution of the population was 50.2% male and 49.8% female. The population was made up of 302 Swiss men (47.7% of the population) and 16 (2.5%) non-Swiss men. There were 299 Swiss women (47.2%) and 16 (2.5%) non-Swiss women. Of the population in the municipality 305 or about 50.6% were born in Meltingen and lived there in 2000. There were 133 or 22.1% who were born in the same canton, while 126 or 20.9% were born somewhere else in Switzerland, and 30 or 5.0% were born outside of Switzerland.

In 2008 there were 5 live births to Swiss citizens and were 8 deaths of Swiss citizens. Ignoring immigration and emigration, the population of Swiss citizens decreased by 3 while the foreign population remained the same. There was 1 Swiss man who immigrated back to Switzerland. At the same time, there was 1 non-Swiss man and 1 non-Swiss woman who immigrated from another country to Switzerland. The total Swiss population change in 2008 (from all sources, including moves across municipal borders) was a decrease of 10 and the non-Swiss population increased by 1 people. This represents a population growth rate of -1.4%.

The age distribution, as of 2000, in Meltingen is; 44 children or 7.3% of the population are between 0 and 6 years old and 100 teenagers or 16.6% are between 7 and 19. Of the adult population, 28 people or 4.6% of the population are between 20 and 24 years old. 193 people or 32.0% are between 25 and 44, and 133 people or 22.1% are between 45 and 64. The senior population distribution is 84 people or 13.9% of the population are between 65 and 79 years old and there are 21 people or 3.5% who are over 80.

As of 2000, there were 243 people who were single and never married in the municipality. There were 304 married individuals, 38 widows or widowers and 18 individuals who are divorced.

As of 2000, there were 236 private households in the municipality, and an average of 2.5 persons per household. There were 50 households that consist of only one person and 14 households with five or more people. Out of a total of 239 households that answered this question, 20.9% were households made up of just one person and there were 1 adults who lived with their parents. Of the rest of the households, there are 74 married couples without children, 94 married couples with children There were 11 single parents with a child or children. There were 6 households that were made up of unrelated people and 3 households that were made up of some sort of institution or another collective housing.

In 2000 there were 142 single family homes (or 74.7% of the total) out of a total of 190 inhabited buildings. There were 27 multi-family buildings (14.2%), along with 16 multi-purpose buildings that were mostly used for housing (8.4%) and 5 other use buildings (commercial or industrial) that also had some housing (2.6%). Of the single family homes 9 were built before 1919, while 29 were built between 1990 and 2000. The greatest number of single family homes (24) were built between 1971 and 1980.

In 2000 there were 245 apartments in the municipality. The most common apartment size was 4 rooms of which there were 85. There were 6 single room apartments and 118 apartments with five or more rooms. Of these apartments, a total of 227 apartments (92.7% of the total) were permanently occupied, while 11 apartments (4.5%) were seasonally occupied and 7 apartments (2.9%) were empty. As of 2009, the construction rate of new housing units was 11.1 new units per 1000 residents. The vacancy rate for the municipality, in 2010, was 0.37%.

The historical population is given in the following chart:

== Sights ==
The entire village of Meltingen is part of the Inventory of Swiss Heritage Sites.

== Politics ==
In the 2007 federal election the most popular party was the FDP which received 35.35% of the vote. The next three most popular parties were the CVP (27.51%), the SVP (19.72%) and the SP (9.28%). In the federal election, a total of 253 votes were cast, and the voter turnout was 52.8%.

== Economy ==
As of 2010, Meltingen had an unemployment rate of 1.2%. As of 2008, there were 17 people employed in the primary economic sector and about 8 businesses involved in this sector. 23 people were employed in the secondary sector and there were 9 businesses in this sector. 49 people were employed in the tertiary sector, with 17 businesses in this sector. There were 294 residents of the municipality who were employed in some capacity, of which females made up 42.9% of the workforce.

In 2008 the total number of full-time equivalent jobs was 66. The number of jobs in the primary sector was 11, of which 10 were in agriculture and 1 was in forestry or lumber production. The number of jobs in the secondary sector was 21 of which 8 or (38.1%) were in manufacturing and 13 (61.9%) were in construction. The number of jobs in the tertiary sector was 34. In the tertiary sector; 4 or 11.8% were in wholesale or retail sales or the repair of motor vehicles, 10 or 29.4% were in the movement and storage of goods, 5 or 14.7% were in a hotel or restaurant, 3 or 8.8% were technical professionals or scientists, 3 or 8.8% were in education.

In 2000, there were 24 workers who commuted into the municipality and 248 workers who commuted away. The municipality is a net exporter of workers, with about 10.3 workers leaving the municipality for every one entering. Of the working population, 20.7% used public transportation to get to work, and 65.6% used a private car.

== Religion ==
From the 2000 census, 504 or 83.6% were Roman Catholic, while 37 or 6.1% belonged to the Swiss Reformed Church. Of the rest of the population, there were 2 individuals (or about 0.33% of the population) who belonged to the Christian Catholic Church, and there was 1 individual who belongs to another Christian church. There were 5 (or about 0.83% of the population) who were Islamic. 42 (or about 6.97% of the population) belonged to no church, are agnostic or atheist, and 12 individuals (or about 1.99% of the population) did not answer the question.

== Education ==
In Meltingen about 225 or (37.3%) of the population have completed non-mandatory upper secondary education, and 41 or (6.8%) have completed additional higher education (either university or a Fachhochschule). Of the 41 who completed tertiary schooling, 63.4% were Swiss men, 26.8% were Swiss women.

During the 2010-2011 school year there were a total of 11 students in the Meltingen school system. The education system in the Canton of Solothurn allows young children to attend two years of non-obligatory Kindergarten. During that school year, there were 11 children in kindergarten. The canton's school system requires students to attend six years of primary school, with some of the children attending smaller, specialized classes. In the municipality there were students in primary school. The secondary school program consists of three lower, obligatory years of schooling, followed by three to five years of optional, advanced schools. All the lower secondary students from Meltingen attend their school in a neighboring municipality.

As of 2000, there were 89 students in Meltingen who came from another municipality, while 27 residents attended schools outside the municipality.
