= Nunningen =

- Municipality
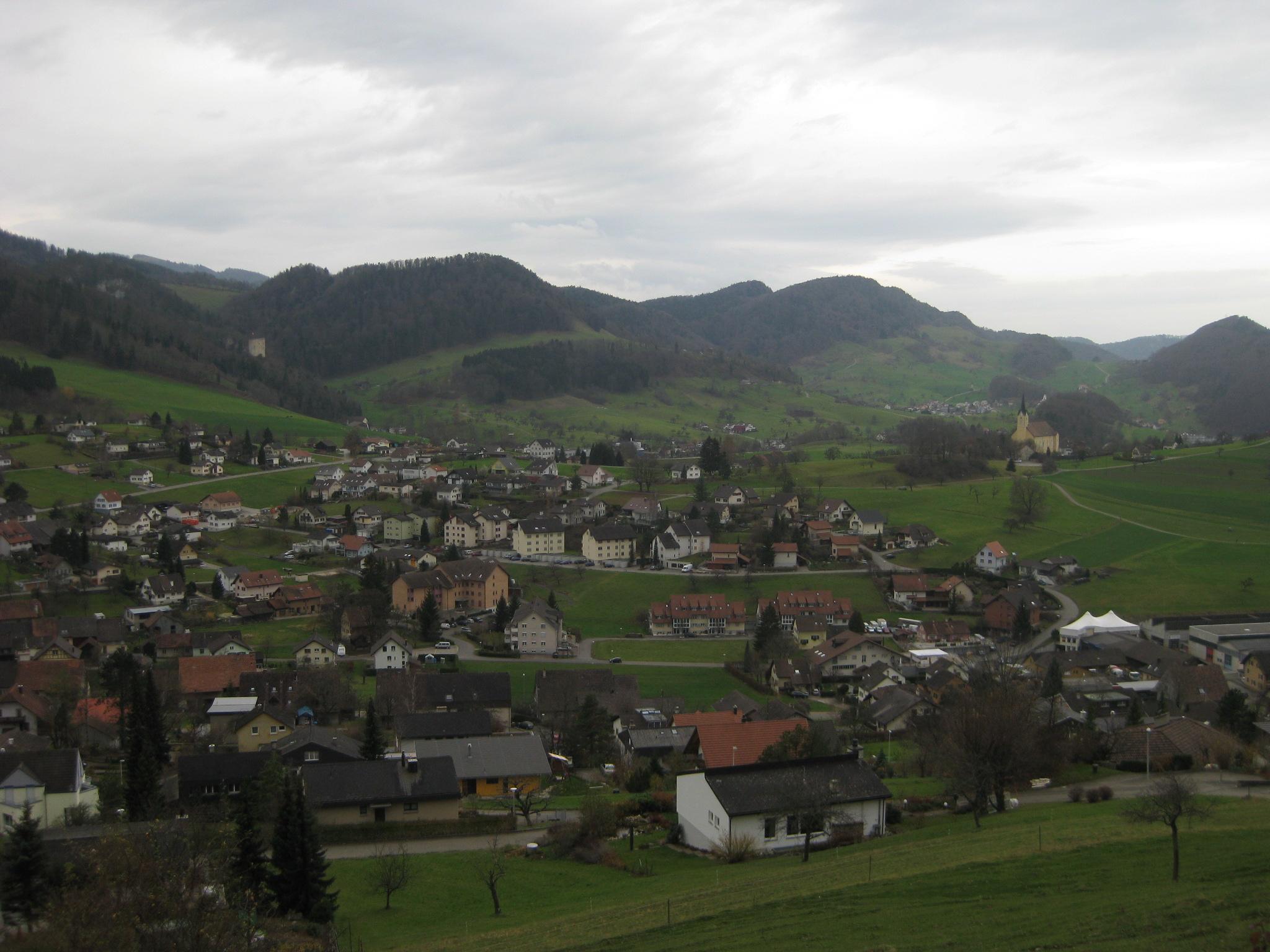
- Nunningen village

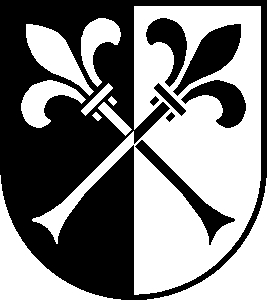
- Coat of arms
- Location of Nunningen
- Location within Switzerland Location within Canton of Solothurn
- Coordinates: 47°24′N 7°37′E
- Country: Switzerland
- Canton: Solothurn
- District: Thierstein

Area
  - Total: 10.34 km^{2} (3.99 sq mi)
- Elevation: 621 m (2,037 ft)

Population (December 2020)
  - Total: 1,914
  - Density: 185.1/km^{2} (479.4/sq mi)
- Time zone: UTC+01:00 (CET)
  - Summer (DST): UTC+02:00 (CEST)
- Postal code: 4208
- SFOS number: 2621
- ISO 3166 code: CH-SO
- Surrounded by: Beinwil, Breitenbach, Bretzwil (BL), Fehren, Himmelried, Lauwil (BL), Meltingen, Seewen, Zullwil
- Website: www.nunningen.ch

Nunningen is a municipality in the district of Thierstein in the canton of Solothurn in Switzerland.

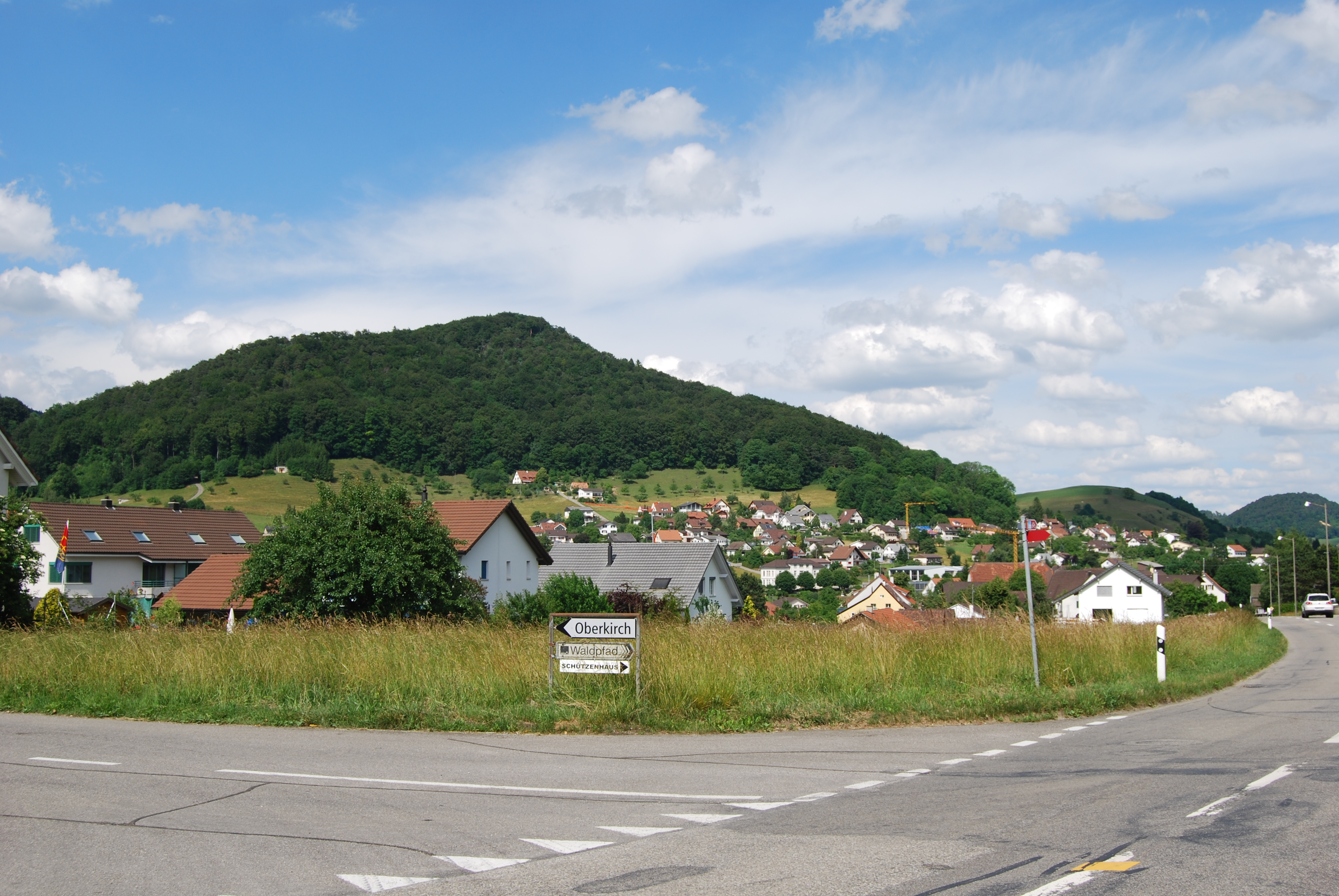
Nunningen

== History ==
Nunningen is first mentioned in 1152 as Nunningen.

== Geography ==
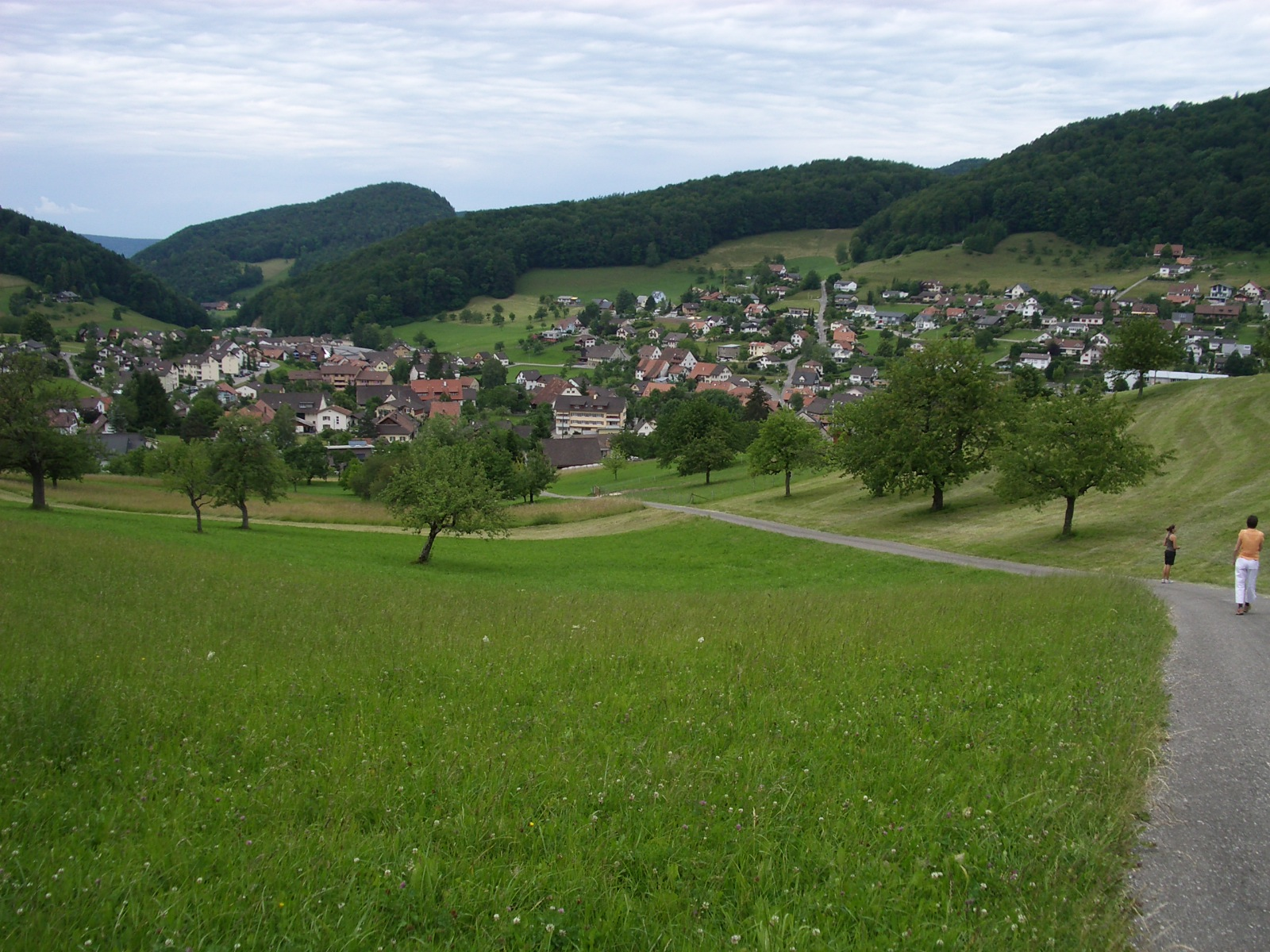
Nunningen

Aerial view (1953)

Nunningen has an area, as of 2009, of 10.34 square kilometers (3.99 sq mi). Of this area, 4.28 km^{2} (1.65 sq mi) or 41.4% is used for agricultural purposes, while 5.12 km^{2} (1.98 sq mi) or 49.5% is forested. Of the rest of the land, 0.88 km^{2} (0.34 sq mi) or 8.5% is settled (buildings or roads) and 0.01 km^{2} (2.5 acres) or 0.1% is unproductive land.

Of the built up area, industrial buildings made up 1.1% of the total area while housing and buildings made up 4.6% and transportation infrastructure made up 2.4%. Out of the forested land, 47.5% of the total land area is heavily forested and 2.0% is covered with orchards or small clusters of trees. Of the agricultural land, 5.5% is used for growing crops and 33.9% is pastures, while 1.6% is used for orchards or vine crops.

The municipality is located in the Thierstein district. It consists of the village of Nunningen and the hamlets of Engi mit Mühle and Roderis.

== Coat of arms ==
The blazon of the municipal coat of arms is Per pale Sable and Argent two Staffs fleury conterchanged in saltire.

== Demographics ==
Nunningen has a population (as of December 2020) of 1,914. As of 2008, 7.7% of the population are resident foreign nationals. Over the last 10 years (1999–2009 ) the population has changed at a rate of -1.1%. It has changed at a rate of -0.6% due to migration and at a rate of 0.3% due to births and deaths.

Most of the population (as of 2000) speaks German (1,750 or 95.0%), with Albanian being second most common (30 or 1.6%) and Serbo-Croatian being third (10 or 0.5%). There are 8 people who speak French and 1 person who speaks Romansh.

As of 2008, the gender distribution of the population was 51.2% male and 48.8% female. The population was made up of 872 Swiss men (47.0% of the population) and 78 (4.2%) non-Swiss men. There were 843 Swiss women (45.4%) and 64 (3.4%) non-Swiss women. Of the population in the municipality 870 or about 47.2% were born in Nunningen and lived there in 2000. There were 285 or 15.5% who were born in the same canton, while 453 or 24.6% were born somewhere else in Switzerland, and 183 or 9.9% were born outside of Switzerland.

In 2008 there were 12 live births to Swiss citizens and 1 birth to non-Swiss citizens, and in same time span there were 15 deaths of Swiss citizens and 2 non-Swiss citizen deaths. Ignoring immigration and emigration, the population of Swiss citizens decreased by 3 while the foreign population decreased by 1. There were 6 Swiss women who immigrated back to Switzerland. At the same time, there were 9 non-Swiss men and 8 non-Swiss women who immigrated from another country to Switzerland. The total Swiss population remained the same in 2008 and the non-Swiss population increased by 7 people. This represents a population growth rate of 0.4%.

The age distribution, as of 2000, in Nunningen is; 155 children or 8.4% of the population are between 0 and 6 years old and 338 teenagers or 18.3% are between 7 and 19. Of the adult population, 79 people or 4.3% of the population are between 20 and 24 years old. 571 people or 31.0% are between 25 and 44, and 427 people or 23.2% are between 45 and 64. The senior population distribution is 200 people or 10.9% of the population are between 65 and 79 years old and there are 73 people or 4.0% who are over 80.

As of 2000, there were 774 people who were single and never married in the municipality. There were 896 married individuals, 114 widows or widowers and 59 individuals who are divorced.

As of 2000, there were 702 private households in the municipality, and an average of 2.5 persons per household. There were 188 households that consist of only one person and 63 households with five or more people. Out of a total of 719 households that answered this question, 26.1% were households made up of just one person and there were 14 adults who lived with their parents. Of the rest of the households, there are 214 married couples without children, 246 married couples with children There were 31 single parents with a child or children. There were 9 households that were made up of unrelated people and 17 households that were made up of some sort of institution or another collective housing.

In 2000 there were 410 single-family homes (or 71.8% of the total) out of a total of 571 inhabited buildings. There were 65 multi-family buildings (11.4%), along with 66 multi-purpose buildings that were mostly used for housing (11.6%) and 30 other use buildings (commercial or industrial) that also had some housing (5.3%). Of the single-family homes 45 were built before 1919, while 75 were built between 1990 and 2000. The greatest number of single-family homes (70) were built between 1971 and 1980.

In 2000 there were 760 apartments in the municipality. The most common apartment size was 5 rooms of which there were 220. There were 16 single-room apartments and 361 apartments with five or more rooms. Of these apartments, a total of 681 apartments (89.6% of the total) were permanently occupied, while 54 apartments (7.1%) were seasonally occupied and 25 apartments (3.3%) were empty. As of 2009, the construction rate of new housing units was 1.1 new units per 1000 residents. The vacancy rate for the municipality, in 2010, was 2.95%.

The historical population is given in the following chart:

== Politics ==
In the 2007 federal election the most popular party was the CVP which received 32.02% of the vote. The next three most popular parties were the FDP (27.28%), the SVP (24.07%) and the SP (9.15%). In the federal election, a total of 725 votes were cast, and the voter turnout was 51.1%.

== Economy ==
As of 2010, Nunningen had an unemployment rate of 2.9%. As of 2008, there were 57 people employed in the primary economic sector and about 22 businesses involved in this sector. 342 people were employed in the secondary sector and there were 24 businesses in this sector. 288 people were employed in the tertiary sector, with 55 businesses in this sector. There were 958 residents of the municipality who were employed in some capacity, of which females made up 40.9% of the workforce.

In 2008 the total number of full-time equivalent jobs was 558. The number of jobs in the primary sector was 29, all of which were in agriculture. The number of jobs in the secondary sector was 314 of which 214 or (68.2%) were in manufacturing and 101 (32.2%) were in construction. The number of jobs in the tertiary sector was 215. In the tertiary sector; 59 or 27.4% were in wholesale or retail sales or the repair of motor vehicles, 18 or 8.4% were in the movement and storage of goods, 6 or 2.8% were in a hotel or restaurant, 4 or 1.9% were in the information industry, 13 or 6.0% were the insurance or financial industry, 19 or 8.8% were technical professionals or scientists, 23 or 10.7% were in education and 62 or 28.8% were in health care.

In 2000, there were 390 workers who commuted into the municipality and 611 workers who commuted away. The municipality is a net exporter of workers, with about 1.6 workers leaving the municipality for every one entering. About 11.5% of the workforce coming into Nunningen are coming from outside Switzerland. Of the working population, 16.9% used public transportation to get to work, and 57.6% used a private car.

== Religion ==
From the 2000 census, 1,345 or 73.0% were Roman Catholic, while 228 or 12.4% belonged to the Swiss Reformed Church. Of the rest of the population, there were 11 members of an Orthodox church (or about 0.60% of the population), there were 3 individuals (or about 0.16% of the population) who belonged to the Christian Catholic Church, and there were 18 individuals (or about 0.98% of the population) who belonged to another Christian church. There were 4 individuals (or about 0.22% of the population) who were Jewish, and 24 (or about 1.30% of the population) who were Islamic. There were 8 individuals who were Buddhist. 168 (or about 9.12% of the population) belonged to no church, are agnostic or atheist, and 34 individuals (or about 1.84% of the population) did not answer the question.

== Education ==
In Nunningen about 670 or (36.4%) of the population have completed non-mandatory upper secondary education, and 160 or (8.7%) have completed additional higher education (either university or a Fachhochschule). Of the 160 who completed tertiary schooling, 68.8% were Swiss men, 23.8% were Swiss women, 5.0% were non-Swiss men.

During the 2010-2011 school year there were a total of 152 students in the Nunningen school system. The education system in the Canton of Solothurn allows young children to attend two years of non-obligatory Kindergarten. During that school year, there were 40 children in kindergarten. The canton's school system requires students to attend six years of primary school, with some of the children attending smaller, specialized classes. In the municipality there were 112 students in primary school. The secondary school program consists of three lower, obligatory years of schooling, followed by three to five years of optional, advanced schools. All the lower secondary students from Nunningen attend their school in a neighboring municipality.

As of 2000, there were 43 students in Nunningen who came from another municipality, while 91 residents attended schools outside the municipality.
