= Büsserach =

- Municipality
- Coat of arms
- Location of Büsserach
- Location within Switzerland Location within Canton of Solothurn
- Coordinates: 47°23.6′N 7°32.5′E
- Country: Switzerland
- Canton: Solothurn
- District: Thierstein

Area
  - Total: 7.55 km^{2} (2.92 sq mi)
- Elevation: 420 m (1,380 ft)

Population (December 2020)
  - Total: 2,296
  - Density: 304/km^{2} (788/sq mi)
- Demonym: Büsseracher
- Time zone: UTC+01:00 (CET)
  - Summer (DST): UTC+02:00 (CEST)
- Postal code: 4227
- SFOS number: 2614
- ISO 3166 code: CH-SO
- Surrounded by: Breitenbach, Erschwil, Fehren, Grindel, Meltingen, Wahlen bei Laufen
- Website: www.buesserach.ch

Büsserach is a municipality in the district of Thierstein in the canton of Solothurn in Switzerland.

== History ==
Büsserach is first mentioned in 1194 as Buezherach.

== Geography ==
Aerial view from 200 m by Walter Mittelholzer (1925)

Büsserach has an area, as of 2009, of 7.55 square kilometers (2.92 sq mi). Of this area, 3.2 km^{2} (1.2 sq mi) or 42.4% is used for agricultural purposes, while 3.49 km^{2} (1.35 sq mi) or 46.2% is forested. Of the rest of the land, 0.83 km^{2} (0.32 sq mi) or 11.0% is settled (buildings or roads), 0.02 km^{2} (4.9 acres) or 0.3% is either rivers or lakes and 0.01 km^{2} (2.5 acres) or 0.1% is unproductive land.

Of the built up area, industrial buildings made up 1.7% of the total area while housing and buildings made up 7.3% and transportation infrastructure made up 1.9%. Out of the forested land, 43.7% of the total land area is heavily forested and 2.5% is covered with orchards or small clusters of trees. Of the agricultural land, 11.1% is used for growing crops and 27.2% is pastures, while 4.1% is used for orchards or vine crops. All the water in the municipality is flowing water.

The municipality is located in the Thierstein district, on the eastern slope of the valley that runs to the Passwang Pass. It consists of the village of Büsserach and Neu-Thierstein Castle.

== Coat of arms ==
The blazon of the municipal coat of arms is Gules the Castle "Thierstein" Or issuant from Coupeaux Vert.

== Demographics ==
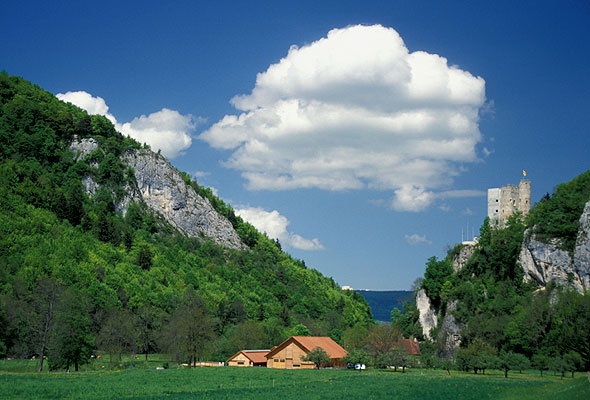
Neu-Thierstein Castle

Büsserach has a population (as of December 2020) of 2,296. As of 2008, 10.7% of the population are resident foreign nationals. Over the last 10 years (1999–2009 ) the population has changed at a rate of 4.7%. It has changed at a rate of 2.1% due to migration and at a rate of 1.6% due to births and deaths.

Most of the population (as of 2000) speaks German (1,720 or 92.2%), with Serbo-Croatian being second most common (36 or 1.9%) and Albanian being third (30 or 1.6%). There are 18 people who speak French and 1 person who speaks Romansh.

As of 2008, the gender distribution of the population was 51.2% male and 48.8% female. The population was made up of 865 Swiss men (44.7% of the population) and 126 (6.5%) non-Swiss men. There were 852 Swiss women (44.0%) and 94 (4.9%) non-Swiss women. Of the population in the municipality 737 or about 39.5% were born in Büsserach and lived there in 2000. There were 393 or 21.1% who were born in the same canton, while 515 or 27.6% were born somewhere else in Switzerland, and 213 or 11.4% were born outside of Switzerland.

In 2008 there were 17 live births to Swiss citizens and were 22 deaths of Swiss citizens. Ignoring immigration and emigration, the population of Swiss citizens decreased by 5 while the foreign population remained the same. There was 1 Swiss man who immigrated back to Switzerland and 2 Swiss women who emigrated from Switzerland. At the same time, there were 5 non-Swiss men and 3 non-Swiss women who immigrated from another country to Switzerland. The total Swiss population change in 2008 (from all sources, including moves across municipal borders) was an increase of 27 and the non-Swiss population increased by 7 people. This represents a population growth rate of 1.8%.

The age distribution, as of 2000, in Büsserach is; 171 children or 9.2% of the population are between 0 and 6 years old and 275 teenagers or 14.7% are between 7 and 19. Of the adult population, 117 people or 6.3% of the population are between 20 and 24 years old. 595 people or 31.9% are between 25 and 44, and 434 people or 23.3% are between 45 and 64. The senior population distribution is 202 people or 10.8% of the population are between 65 and 79 years old and there are 71 people or 3.8% who are over 80.

As of 2000, there were 764 people who were single and never married in the municipality. There were 929 married individuals, 115 widows or widowers and 57 individuals who are divorced.

As of 2000, there were 754 private households in the municipality, and an average of 2.5 persons per household. There were 208 households that consist of only one person and 43 households with five or more people. Out of a total of 759 households that answered this question, 27.4% were households made up of just one person and there were 16 adults who lived with their parents. Of the rest of the households, there are 212 married couples without children, 288 married couples with children There were 25 single parents with a child or children. There were 5 households that were made up of unrelated people and 5 households that were made up of some sort of institution or another collective housing.

In 2000 there were 390 single family homes (or 75.0% of the total) out of a total of 520 inhabited buildings. There were 79 multi-family buildings (15.2%), along with 34 multi-purpose buildings that were mostly used for housing (6.5%) and 17 other use buildings (commercial or industrial) that also had some housing (3.3%). Of the single family homes 27 were built before 1919, while 82 were built between 1990 and 2000. The greatest number of single family homes (78) were built between 1946 and 1960.

In 2000 there were 795 apartments in the municipality. The most common apartment size was 4 rooms of which there were 230. There were 20 single room apartments and 312 apartments with five or more rooms. Of these apartments, a total of 738 apartments (92.8% of the total) were permanently occupied, while 33 apartments (4.2%) were seasonally occupied and 24 apartments (3.0%) were empty. As of 2009, the construction rate of new housing units was 2.6 new units per 1000 residents. The vacancy rate for the municipality, in 2010, was 1.62%.

The historical population is given in the following chart:

== Politics ==
In the 2007 federal election the most popular party was the FDP which received 36.1% of the vote. The next three most popular parties were the SVP (27.51%), the CVP (20.84%) and the SP (8.68%). In the federal election, a total of 632 votes were cast, and the voter turnout was 46.6%.

== Economy ==
As of 2010, Büsserach had an unemployment rate of 2.7%. As of 2008, there were 24 people employed in the primary economic sector and about 10 businesses involved in this sector. 284 people were employed in the secondary sector and there were 36 businesses in this sector. 239 people were employed in the tertiary sector, with 44 businesses in this sector. There were 985 residents of the municipality who were employed in some capacity, of which females made up 39.7% of the workforce.

In 2008 the total number of full-time equivalent jobs was 456. The number of jobs in the primary sector was 17, of which 14 were in agriculture and 3 were in forestry or lumber production. The number of jobs in the secondary sector was 267 of which 178 or (66.7%) were in manufacturing and 90 (33.7%) were in construction. The number of jobs in the tertiary sector was 172. In the tertiary sector; 63 or 36.6% were in wholesale or retail sales or the repair of motor vehicles, 19 or 11.0% were in the movement and storage of goods, 22 or 12.8% were in a hotel or restaurant, 1 was in the information industry, 2 or 1.2% were the insurance or financial industry, 8 or 4.7% were technical professionals or scientists, 19 or 11.0% were in education and 1 was in health care.

In 2000, there were 300 workers who commuted into the municipality and 741 workers who commuted away. The municipality is a net exporter of workers, with about 2.5 workers leaving the municipality for every one entering. About 10.7% of the workforce coming into Büsserach are coming from outside Switzerland. Of the working population, 18.4% used public transportation to get to work, and 57.7% used a private car.

== Religion ==
From the 2000 census, 1,423 or 76.3% were Roman Catholic, while 198 or 10.6% belonged to the Swiss Reformed Church. Of the rest of the population, there were 16 members of an Orthodox church (or about 0.86% of the population), there was 1 individual who belongs to the Christian Catholic Church, and there were 10 individuals (or about 0.54% of the population) who belonged to another Christian church. There were 40 (or about 2.14% of the population) who were Islamic. There was 1 person who was Buddhist, 2 individuals who were Hindu and 5 individuals who belonged to another church. 162 (or about 8.69% of the population) belonged to no church, are agnostic or atheist, and 7 individuals (or about 0.38% of the population) did not answer the question.

== Education ==
In Büsserach about 785 or (42.1%) of the population have completed non-mandatory upper secondary education, and 145 or (7.8%) have completed additional higher education (either university or a Fachhochschule). Of the 145 who completed tertiary schooling, 77.9% were Swiss men, 14.5% were Swiss women, 5.5% were non-Swiss men.

During the 2010-2011 school year there were a total of 164 students in the Büsserach school system. The education system in the Canton of Solothurn allows young children to attend two years of non-obligatory Kindergarten. During that school year, there were 33 children in kindergarten. The canton's school system requires students to attend six years of primary school, with some of the children attending smaller, specialized classes. In the municipality there were 131 students in primary school. The secondary school program consists of three lower, obligatory years of schooling, followed by three to five years of optional, advanced schools. All the lower secondary students from Büsserach attend their school in a neighboring municipality.

As of 2000, there were 7 students in Büsserach who came from another municipality, while 106 residents attended schools outside the municipality.
