= Fehren =

- Municipality
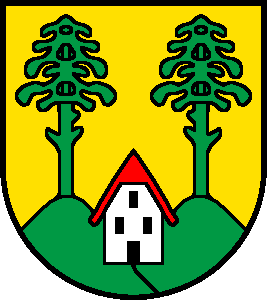
- Coat of arms
- Location of Fehren
- Location within Switzerland Location within Canton of Solothurn
- Coordinates: 47°24′N 7°35′E
- Country: Switzerland
- Canton: Solothurn
- District: Thierstein

Area
  - Total: 1.48 km^{2} (0.57 sq mi)
- Elevation: 587 m (1,926 ft)

Population (December 2020)
  - Total: 595
  - Density: 402/km^{2} (1,040/sq mi)
- Time zone: UTC+01:00 (CET)
  - Summer (DST): UTC+02:00 (CEST)
- Postal code: 4232
- SFOS number: 2616
- ISO 3166 code: CH-SO
- Surrounded by: Breitenbach, Büsserach, Meltingen, Nunningen, Zullwil
- Website: http://www.fehren.ch SFSO statistics

Fehren is a municipality in the district of Thierstein in the canton of Solothurn in Switzerland.

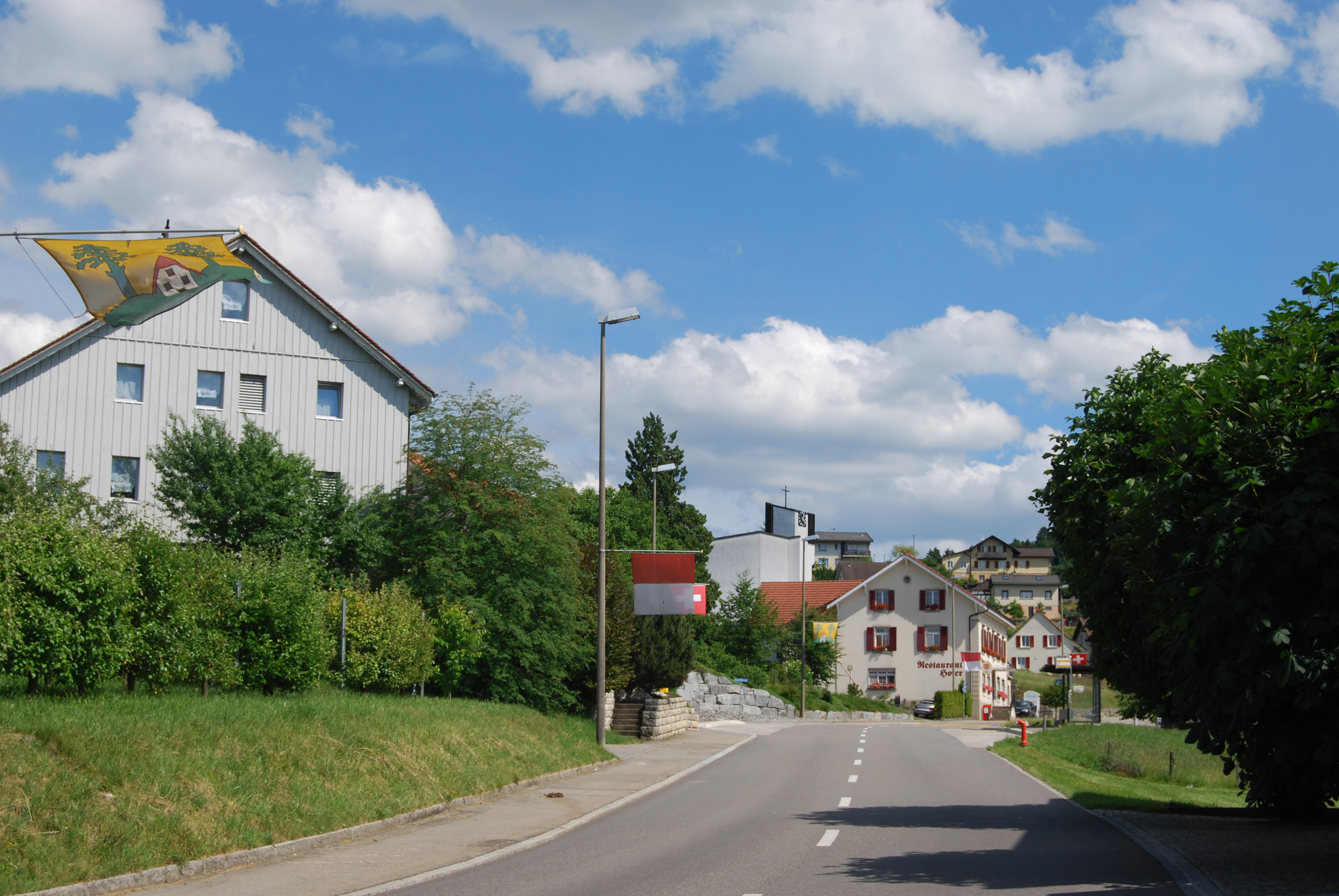
Fehren

== History ==
Fehren is first mentioned in 1371 as der Hofe in Ferren.

== Geography ==
Fehren has an area, as of 2009, of 1.48 square kilometers (0.57 sq mi). Of this area, 0.81 km^{2} (0.31 sq mi) or 54.7% is used for agricultural purposes, while 0.45 km^{2} (0.17 sq mi) or 30.4% is forested. Of the rest of the land, 0.23 km^{2} (0.089 sq mi) or 15.5% is settled (buildings or roads), 0.01 km^{2} (2.5 acres) or 0.7% is either rivers or lakes.

Of the built up area, housing and buildings made up 10.1% and transportation infrastructure made up 4.1%. Power and water infrastructure as well as other special developed areas made up 1.4% of the area Out of the forested land, 27.7% of the total land area is heavily forested and 2.7% is covered with orchards or small clusters of trees. Of the agricultural land, 9.5% is used for growing crops and 40.5% is pastures, while 4.7% is used for orchards or vine crops. All the water in the municipality is flowing water.

The municipality is located in the Thierstein district, on the eastern slope above the Breitenbach valley.

== Coat of arms ==
The blazon of the municipal coat of arms is Or a House Argent roofed Gules between two Pine Trees Vert issuant from as many Mounts of the same.

== Demographics ==
Fehren has a population (as of December 2020) of 595. As of 2008, 2.5% of the population are resident foreign nationals. Over the last 10 years (1999–2009 ) the population has changed at a rate of 17.8%. It has changed at a rate of 6.3% due to migration and at a rate of 8.4% due to births and deaths.

Most of the population (as of 2000) speaks German (491 or 96.5%), with French being second most common (9 or 1.8%) and Turkish being third (4 or 0.8%).

As of 2008, the gender distribution of the population was 48.0% male and 52.0% female. The population was made up of 287 Swiss men (46.7% of the population) and 8 (1.3%) non-Swiss men. There were 309 Swiss women (50.2%) and 11 (1.8%) non-Swiss women. Of the population in the municipality 207 or about 40.7% were born in Fehren and lived there in 2000. There were 136 or 26.7% who were born in the same canton, while 118 or 23.2% were born somewhere else in Switzerland, and 32 or 6.3% were born outside of Switzerland.

In 2008 there were 5 live births to Swiss citizens and were 4 deaths of Swiss citizens. Ignoring immigration and emigration, the population of Swiss citizens increased by 1 while the foreign population remained the same. There were 2 Swiss women who emigrated from Switzerland. At the same time, there was 1 non-Swiss woman who emigrated from Switzerland to another country. The total Swiss population remained the same in 2008 and the non-Swiss population decreased by 3 people. This represents a population growth rate of -0.5%.

The age distribution, as of 2000, in Fehren is; 43 children or 8.4% of the population are between 0 and 6 years old and 67 teenagers or 13.2% are between 7 and 19. Of the adult population, 30 people or 5.9% of the population are between 20 and 24 years old. 176 people or 34.6% are between 25 and 44, and 127 people or 25.0% are between 45 and 64. The senior population distribution is 53 people or 10.4% of the population are between 65 and 79 years old and there are 13 people or 2.6% who are over 80.

As of 2000, there were 207 people who were single and never married in the municipality. There were 255 married individuals, 40 widows or widowers and 7 individuals who are divorced.

As of 2000, there were 199 private households in the municipality, and an average of 2.5 persons per household. There were 47 households that consist of only one person and 18 households with five or more people. Out of a total of 202 households that answered this question, 23.3% were households made up of just one person and there were 6 adults who lived with their parents. Of the rest of the households, there are 59 married couples without children, 76 married couples with children There were 10 single parents with a child or children. There was 1 household that was made up of unrelated people and 3 households that were made up of some sort of institution or another collective housing.

In 2000 there were 140 single family homes (or 79.5% of the total) out of a total of 176 inhabited buildings. There were 21 multi-family buildings (11.9%), along with 13 multi-purpose buildings that were mostly used for housing (7.4%) and 2 other use buildings (commercial or industrial) that also had some housing (1.1%). Of the single family homes 8 were built before 1919, while 27 were built between 1990 and 2000. The greatest number of single family homes (28) were built between 1971 and 1980.

In 2000 there were 211 apartments in the municipality. The most common apartment size was 4 rooms of which there were 66. There were 2 single room apartments and 101 apartments with five or more rooms. Of these apartments, a total of 194 apartments (91.9% of the total) were permanently occupied, while 13 apartments (6.2%) were seasonally occupied and 4 apartments (1.9%) were empty. As of 2009, the construction rate of new housing units was 3.3 new units per 1000 residents. The vacancy rate for the municipality, in 2010, was 1.57%.

The historical population is given in the following chart:

== Politics ==
In the 2007 federal election the most popular party was the SVP which received 31.1% of the vote. The next three most popular parties were the FDP (27.03%), the CVP (22.97%) and the SP (9.94%). In the federal election, a total of 198 votes were cast, and the voter turnout was 44.5%.

== Economy ==
As of 2010, Fehren had an unemployment rate of 2.6%. As of 2008, there were 19 people employed in the primary economic sector and about 7 businesses involved in this sector. 8 people were employed in the secondary sector and there were 3 businesses in this sector. 52 people were employed in the tertiary sector, with 10 businesses in this sector. There were 278 residents of the municipality who were employed in some capacity, of which females made up 37.4% of the workforce.

In 2008 the total number of full-time equivalent jobs was 55. The number of jobs in the primary sector was 12, of which 9 were in agriculture and 3 were in forestry or lumber production. The number of jobs in the secondary sector was 5 of which 4 or (80.0%) were in manufacturing and 1 was in construction. The number of jobs in the tertiary sector was 38. In the tertiary sector; 3 or 7.9% were in wholesale or retail sales or the repair of motor vehicles, 2 or 5.3% were in a hotel or restaurant, 2 or 5.3% were technical professionals or scientists, 4 or 10.5% were in education.

In 2000, there were 23 workers who commuted into the municipality and 236 workers who commuted away. The municipality is a net exporter of workers, with about 10.3 workers leaving the municipality for every one entering. Of the working population, 23% used public transportation to get to work, and 62.9% used a private car.

== Religion ==
From the 2000 census, 395 or 77.6% were Roman Catholic, while 59 or 11.6% belonged to the Swiss Reformed Church. Of the rest of the population, there was 1 member of an Orthodox church who belonged, there were 3 individuals (or about 0.59% of the population) who belonged to the Christian Catholic Church, and there was 1 individual who belongs to another Christian church. There was 1 individual who was Islamic. There FALSE and 2 individuals who belonged to another church. 36 (or about 7.07% of the population) belonged to no church, are agnostic or atheist, and 11 individuals (or about 2.16% of the population) did not answer the question.

== Education ==
In Fehren about 194 or (38.1%) of the population have completed non-mandatory upper secondary education, and 43 or (8.4%) have completed additional higher education (either university or a Fachhochschule). Of the 43 who completed tertiary schooling, 67.4% were Swiss men, 27.9% were Swiss women.

During the 2010–2011 school year there were a total of 75 students in the Fehren school system. The education system in the Canton of Solothurn allows young children to attend two years of non-obligatory Kindergarten. During that school year, there were 15 children in kindergarten. The canton's school system requires students to attend six years of primary school, with some of the children attending smaller, specialized classes. In the municipality there were 60 students in primary school. The secondary school program consists of three lower, obligatory years of schooling, followed by three to five years of optional, advanced schools. All the lower secondary students from Fehren attend their school in a neighboring municipality.

As of 2000, there were 30 students from Fehren who attended schools outside the municipality.
