= Grindel, Switzerland =

Grindel
- Municipality
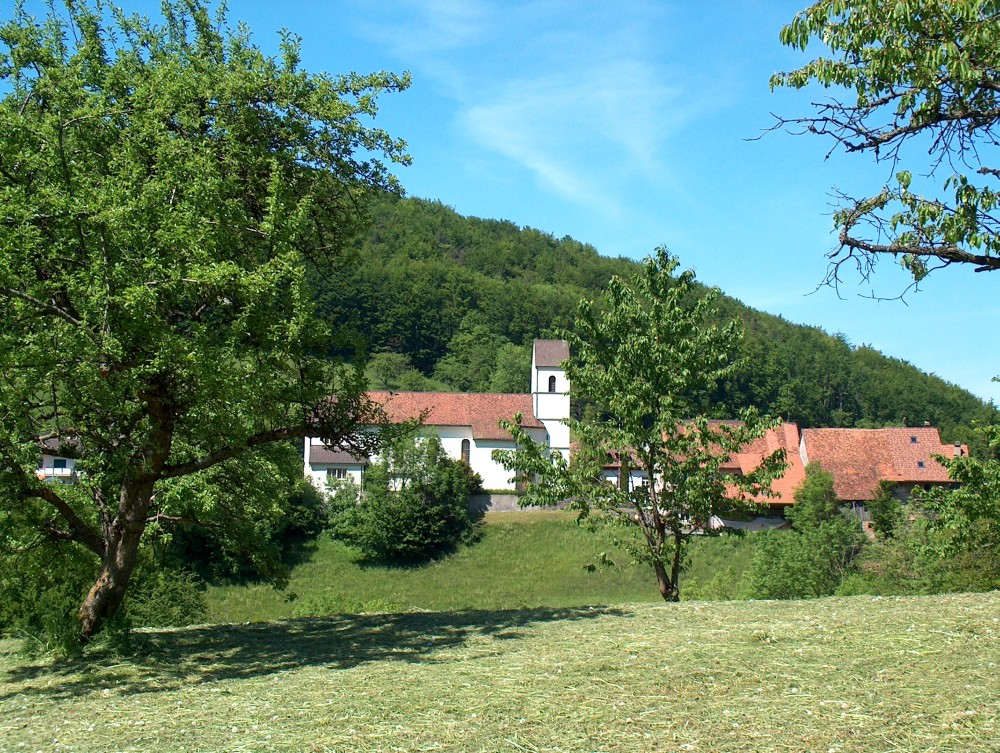
- Grindel village

- Coat of arms
- Location of Grindel
- Location within Switzerland Location within Canton of Solothurn
- Coordinates: 47°23′N 7°30′E
- Country: Switzerland
- Canton: Solothurn
- District: Thierstein

Area
  - Total: 3.06 km^{2} (1.18 sq mi)
- Elevation: 577 m (1,893 ft)

Population (December 2020)
  - Total: 502
  - Density: 164/km^{2} (425/sq mi)
- Time zone: UTC+01:00 (CET)
  - Summer (DST): UTC+02:00 (CEST)
- Postal code: 4247
- SFOS number: 2617
- ISO 3166 code: CH-SO
- Surrounded by: Bärschwil, Büsserach, Erschwil, Laufen (BL), Montsevelier (JU), Wahlen bei Laufen (BL)
- Website: www.grindel.ch

Grindel (French: Grandelle) is a municipality in the district of Thierstein in the canton of Solothurn in Switzerland.

== History ==
Grindel is first mentioned in 1147 as Crindil.

== Geography ==
Grindel has an area, as of 2009, of 3.06 square kilometers (1.18 sq mi). Of this area, 1.26 km^{2} (0.49 sq mi) or 41.2% is used for agricultural purposes, while 1.53 km^{2} (0.59 sq mi) or 50.0% is forested. Of the rest of the land, 0.2 km^{2} (0.077 sq mi) or 6.5% is settled (buildings or roads) and 0.01 km^{2} (2.5 acres) or 0.3% is unproductive land.

Of the built up area, housing and buildings made up 4.2% and transportation infrastructure made up 2.0%. Out of the forested land, 43.1% of the total land area is heavily forested and 6.9% is covered with orchards or small clusters of trees. Of the agricultural land, 2.0% is used for growing crops and 30.7% is pastures, while 5.2% is used for orchards or vine crops and 3.3% is used for alpine pastures.

The municipality is an S-shaped linear village located in the Thierstein district.

== Coat of arms ==
The blazon of the municipal coat of arms is Gules a Fir tree Vert trunked Sable issuant from a Base of the second and a Fence fesswise of the third.

== Demographics ==
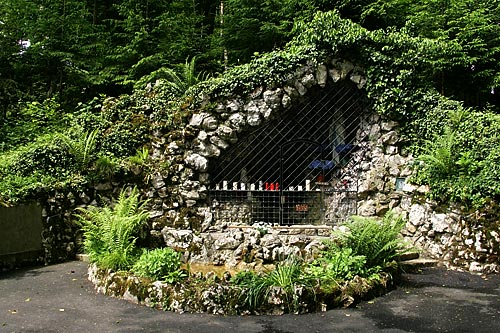
A grotto shrine between Wahlen and Grindel

Grindel has a population (as of December 2020) of 502. As of 2008, 3.7% of the population are resident foreign nationals. Over the last 10 years (1999–2009 ) the population has changed at a rate of -3.2%. It has changed at a rate of 0.4% due to migration and at a rate of -1.6% due to births and deaths.

Most of the population (as of 2000) speaks German (484 or 98.0%), with French being second most common (4 or 0.8%) and Italian being third (1 or 0.2%).

As of 2008, the gender distribution of the population was 50.5% male and 49.5% female. The population was made up of 233 Swiss men (48.0% of the population) and 12 (2.5%) non-Swiss men. There were 233 Swiss women (48.0%) and 7 (1.4%) non-Swiss women. Of the population in the municipality 257 or about 52.0% were born in Grindel and lived there in 2000. There were 64 or 13.0% who were born in the same canton, while 135 or 27.3% were born somewhere else in Switzerland, and 29 or 5.9% were born outside of Switzerland.

In 2008 there were 5 live births to Swiss citizens and were 5 deaths of Swiss citizens. Ignoring immigration and emigration, the population of Swiss citizens remained the same while the foreign population remained the same. There were 2 Swiss women who emigrated from Switzerland. The total Swiss population change in 2008 (from all sources, including moves across municipal borders) was an increase of 2 and the non-Swiss population decreased by 1 people. This represents a population growth rate of 0.2%.

The age distribution, as of 2000, in Grindel is; 44 children or 8.9% of the population are between 0 and 6 years old and 90 teenagers or 18.2% are between 7 and 19. Of the adult population, 14 people or 2.8% of the population are between 20 and 24 years old. 162 people or 32.8% are between 25 and 44, and 108 people or 21.9% are between 45 and 64. The senior population distribution is 64 people or 13.0% of the population are between 65 and 79 years old and there are 12 people or 2.4% who are over 80.

As of 2000, there were 207 people who were single and never married in the municipality. There were 245 married individuals, 28 widows or widowers and 14 individuals who are divorced.

As of 2000, there were 189 private households in the municipality, and an average of 2.6 persons per household. There were 39 households that consist of only one person and 21 households with five or more people. Out of a total of 189 households that answered this question, 20.6% were households made up of just one person and there were 3 adults who lived with their parents. Of the rest of the households, there are 61 married couples without children, 68 married couples with children There were 11 single parents with a child or children. There were 7 households that were made up of unrelated people.

In 2000 there were 136 single family homes (or 82.9% of the total) out of a total of 164 inhabited buildings. There were 12 multi-family buildings (7.3%), along with 14 multi-purpose buildings that were mostly used for housing (8.5%) and 2 other use buildings (commercial or industrial) that also had some housing (1.2%). Of the single family homes 18 were built before 1919, while 14 were built between 1990 and 2000. The greatest number of single family homes (28) were built between 1946 and 1960.

In 2000 there were 195 apartments in the municipality. The most common apartment size was 5 rooms of which there were 62. There were 2 single room apartments and 96 apartments with five or more rooms. Of these apartments, a total of 183 apartments (93.8% of the total) were permanently occupied, while 9 apartments (4.6%) were seasonally occupied and 3 apartments (1.5%) were empty. As of 2009, the construction rate of new housing units was 2.1 new units per 1000 residents. The vacancy rate for the municipality, in 2010, was 1.95%.

The historical population is given in the following chart:

== Politics ==
In the 2007 federal election the most popular party was the FDP which received 32.25% of the vote. The next three most popular parties were the SVP (31%), the CVP (15.75%) and the SP (9.25%). In the federal election, a total of 175 votes were cast, and the voter turnout was 48.1%.

== Economy ==
As of 2010, Grindel had an unemployment rate of 2.1%. As of 2008, there were 12 people employed in the primary economic sector and about 6 businesses involved in this sector. 7 people were employed in the secondary sector and there were 2 businesses in this sector. 16 people were employed in the tertiary sector, with 4 businesses in this sector. There were 239 residents of the municipality who were employed in some capacity, of which females made up 40.6% of the workforce.

In 2008 the total number of full-time equivalent jobs was 30. The number of jobs in the primary sector was 10, all of which were in agriculture. The number of jobs in the secondary sector was 6, all of which were in construction. The number of jobs in the tertiary sector was 14. In the tertiary sector; 6 or 42.9% were in wholesale or retail sales or the repair of motor vehicles, 4 or 28.6% were in the movement and storage of goods, 3 or 21.4% were in education.

In 2000, there were 6 workers who commuted into the municipality and 210 workers who commuted away. The municipality is a net exporter of workers, with about 35.0 workers leaving the municipality for every one entering. Of the working population, 26.8% used public transportation to get to work, and 60.7% used a private car.

== Religion ==
From the 2000 census, 396 or 80.2% were Roman Catholic, while 38 or 7.7% belonged to the Swiss Reformed Church. Of the rest of the population, and there were 12 individuals (or about 2.43% of the population) who belonged to another Christian church. There were 5 individuals who were Buddhist and 1 individual who belonged to another church. 28 (or about 5.67% of the population) belonged to no church, are agnostic or atheist, and 14 individuals (or about 2.83% of the population) did not answer the question.

== Education ==
In Grindel about 169 or (34.2%) of the population have completed non-mandatory upper secondary education, and 27 or (5.5%) have completed additional higher education (either university or a Fachhochschule). Of the 27 who completed tertiary schooling, 66.7% were Swiss men, 22.2% were Swiss women.

During the 2010–2011 school year there were a total of 31 students in the Grindel school system. The education system in the Canton of Solothurn allows young children to attend two years of non-obligatory Kindergarten. During that school year, there were children in kindergarten. The canton's school system requires students to attend six years of primary school, with some of the children attending smaller, specialized classes. In the municipality there were 31 students in primary school. The secondary school program consists of three lower, obligatory years of schooling, followed by three to five years of optional, advanced schools. All the lower secondary students from Grindel attend their school in a neighboring municipality.

As of 2000, there were 57 students from Grindel who attended schools outside the municipality.
