= Bärschwil =

- Municipality
- Flag Coat of arms
- Location of Bärschwil
- Location within Switzerland Location within Canton of Solothurn
- Coordinates: 47°23′N 7°28′E
- Country: Switzerland
- Canton: Solothurn
- District: Thierstein

Area
  - Total: 11.22 km^{2} (4.33 sq mi)
- Elevation: 466 m (1,529 ft)

Population (December 2020)
  - Total: 803
  - Density: 71.6/km^{2} (185/sq mi)
- Time zone: UTC+01:00 (CET)
  - Summer (DST): UTC+02:00 (CEST)
- Postal code: 4252
- SFOS number: 2611
- ISO 3166 code: CH-SO
- Surrounded by: Corban (JU), Courchapoix (JU), Courroux (JU), Grindel, Laufen (BL), Liesberg (BL), Montsevelier (JU), Vicques (JU)
- Website: baerschwil.ch

Bärschwil is a village and municipality in the district of Thierstein in the canton of Solothurn in Switzerland.

== History ==
Bärschwil is first mentioned in 1194 as Bermeswile.

From the 19th century until 1957, Bärschwil was a source of gypsum. Initially, the gypsum was extracted on the surface, but it was subsequently extracted using underground mines accessed via adits. Until 1910, the mine was situated at Gupf; when it was exhausted, a new mine was opened at Kirchacker.

In 1875, the Jura railway line was opened at the northern edge of Bärschwil municipality, along with a station. Between 1894 and 1952, the gypsum mines were linked to the station by the Bärschwil gypsum railway, a narrow- gauge line which used a combination of horse haulage and gravity.

== Geography ==
Aerial view from 3000 m by Walter Mittelholzer (1925)

Bärschwil has an area, as of 2009, of 11.22 square kilometers (4.33 sq mi). Of this area, 4.64 km^{2} (1.79 sq mi) or 41.4% is used for agricultural purposes, while 5.93 km^{2} (2.29 sq mi) or 52.9% is forested. Of the rest of the land, 0.56 km^{2} (0.22 sq mi) or 5.0% is settled (buildings or roads), 0.02 km^{2} (4.9 acres) or 0.2% is either rivers or lakes and 0.03 km^{2} (7.4 acres) or 0.3% is unproductive land.

Of the built up area, housing and buildings made up 2.5% and transportation infrastructure made up 1.8%. Out of the forested land, 49.5% of the total land area is heavily forested and 3.4% is covered with orchards or small clusters of trees. Of the agricultural land, 5.1% is used for growing crops and 31.7% is pastures, while 2.3% is used for orchards or vine crops and 2.2% is used for alpine pastures. All the water in the municipality is flowing water.

The municipality is located in the Thierstein district, in a side valley off the Birs river. It consists of the village of Bärschwil and the hamlets of Wiler and Schmelzi.

== Coat of arms ==
The blazon of the municipal coat of arms is Per fess Azure a Fish naiant Argent and of the last a Crozier Gules.

== Demographics ==
Bärschwil has a population (as of December 2020) of 803. As of 2008, 3.8% of the population were resident foreign nationals. Over the 10 years from 1999 to 2009, the population changed at a rate of -0.5%. It changed at a rate of 1.4% due to migration and at a rate of -2.2% due to births and deaths.

Most of the population (as of 2000) spoke German (831 or 95.3%), with French being second most common (9 or 1.0%) and English being third (9 or 1.0%). There was 1 person who spoke Romansh.

As of 2008, the gender distribution of the population was 52.4% male and 47.6% female. The population was made up of 425 Swiss men (48.9% of the population) and 30 (3.5%) non-Swiss men. There were 393 Swiss women (45.2%) and 21 (2.4%) non-Swiss women. Of the population in the municipality, 446 or about 51.1% were born in Bärschwil and lived there in 2000. There were 94 or 10.8% who were born in the same canton, while 252 or 28.9% were born somewhere else in Switzerland, and 70 or 8.0% were born outside of Switzerland.

In 2008, there were 4 live births to Swiss citizens and 5 deaths of Swiss citizens. Ignoring immigration and emigration, the population of Swiss citizens decreased by 1 while the foreign population remained the same. There were 3 Swiss men and 2 Swiss women who immigrated back to Switzerland. At the same time, there was 1 non-Swiss woman who immigrated from another country to Switzerland. In 2008, both the total Swiss population and the non-Swiss population remained the same. This represents a population growth rate of 0.0%.

The age distribution in Bärschwil, as of 2000, was as follows: 50 children or 5.7% of the population were between 0 and 6 years old and 176 teenagers or 20.2% were between 7 and 19. Of the adult population, 46 people or 5.3% of the population were between 20 and 24 years old, 236 people or 27.1% were between 25 and 44, and 231 people or 26.5% were between 45 and 64. Of the senior population, 110 people or 12.6% of the population were between 65 and 79 years old and 23 people or 2.6% were over 80.

As of 2000, there were 366 people who were single and never married in the municipality. There were 422 married individuals, 46 widows or widowers and 38 individuals who were divorced.

As of 2000, there were 338 private households in the municipality, and an average of 2.6 persons per household. There were 88 households that consisted of only one person and 36 households with five or more people. Out of a total of 338 households that answered this question, 26.0% were households made up of just one person and there were 6 adults who lived with their parents. Of the rest of the households, there were 94 married couples without children and 127 married couples with children. There were 14 single parents with a child or children. There were 9 households that were made up of unrelated people.

In 2000, there were 205 single family homes (or 69.0% of the total) out of a total of 297 inhabited buildings. There were 36 multi-family buildings (12.1%), along with 53 multi-purpose buildings that were mostly used for housing (17.8%) and 3 other use buildings (commercial or industrial) that also had some housing (1.0%). Of the single family homes, 39 were built before 1919, while 25 were built between 1990 and 2000.

In 2000, there were 364 apartments in the municipality. The most common apartment size was 5 rooms of which there were 113. There were 4 single room apartments and 172 apartments with five or more rooms. Of these apartments, a total of 335 apartments (92.0% of the total) were permanently occupied, while 12 apartments (3.3%) were seasonally occupied and 17 apartments (4.7%) were empty. As of 2009, the construction rate of new housing units was 1.2 new units per 1000 residents. The vacancy rate for the municipality, in 2010, was 4.42%.

The historical population is given in the following chart:

== Politics ==
In the 2007 federal election, the most popular party was the SVP which received 35.45% of the vote. The next three most popular parties were the CVP (24.77%), the FDP (21.91%) and the SP (9.33%). In the federal election, a total of 365 votes were cast, and the voter turnout was 50.9%.

== Economy ==
As of 2010, Bärschwil had an unemployment rate of 2.6%. As of 2008, there were 49 people employed in the primary economic sector and about 22 businesses involved in this sector. 52 people were employed in the secondary sector and there were 12 businesses in this sector. 25 people were employed in the tertiary sector, with 11 businesses in this sector. There were 433 residents of the municipality who were employed in some capacity, of which females made up 37.4% of the workforce.

In 2008, the total number of full-time equivalent jobs was 97. The number of jobs in the primary sector was 32, all of which were in agriculture. The number of jobs in the secondary sector was 47, of which 19 (40.4%) were in manufacturing and 28 (59.6%) were in construction. The number of jobs in the tertiary sector was 18. In the tertiary sector, 2 or 11.1% were in wholesale or retail sales or the repair of motor vehicles, 4 or 22.2% were in the movement and storage of goods, 4 or 22.2% were in a hotel or restaurant, and 6 or 33.3% were in education.

In 2000, there were 40 workers who commuted into the municipality and 331 workers who commuted away. The municipality is a net exporter of workers, with about 8.3 workers leaving the municipality for every one entering. Of the working population, 26.1% used public transportation to get to work, and 56.4% used a private car.

== Religion ==
From the 2000 census, 645 or 74.0% were Roman Catholic, while 81 or 9.3% belonged to the Swiss Reformed Church. Of the rest of the population, there were 2 members of an Orthodox church (or about 0.23% of the population), there were 10 individuals (or about 1.15% of the population) who belonged to the Christian Catholic Church, and there were 13 individuals (or about 1.49% of the population) who belonged to another Christian church. There were 7 (or about 0.80% of the population) who were Muslim. There was 1 person who was Buddhist and 1 person who was Hindu. 95 (or about 10.89% of the population) belonged to no church or were agnostic or atheist, and 17 individuals (or about 1.95% of the population) did not answer the question.

== Education ==
In Bärschwil, about 291 or 33.4% of the population have completed non-mandatory upper secondary education, and 48 or 5.5% have completed additional higher education (either university or a Fachhochschule). Of the 48 who completed tertiary schooling, 77.1% were Swiss men and 16.7% were Swiss women.

During the 2010–2011 school year, there were a total of 45 students in the Bärschwil school system. The education system in the Canton of Solothurn allows young children to attend two years of non-obligatory Kindergarten. During that school year, there were children in kindergarten. The canton's school system requires students to attend six years of primary school, with some of the children attending smaller, specialized classes. In the municipality there were 45 students in primary school. The secondary school program consists of three lower, obligatory years of schooling, followed by three to five years of optional, advanced schools. All the lower secondary students from Bärschwil attend their school in a neighboring municipality.

As of 2000, there were 37 students in Bärschwil who came from another municipality, while 62 residents attended schools outside the municipality.
