= Beinwil =

Beinwil may refer to:

in Switzerland:

- Beinwil (Freiamt) in the canton of Aargau
- Beinwil am See in the canton of Aargau
- Beinwil, Solothurn, location of the Beinwil Abbey
