= Ruins of Radegg =

Radegg Castle
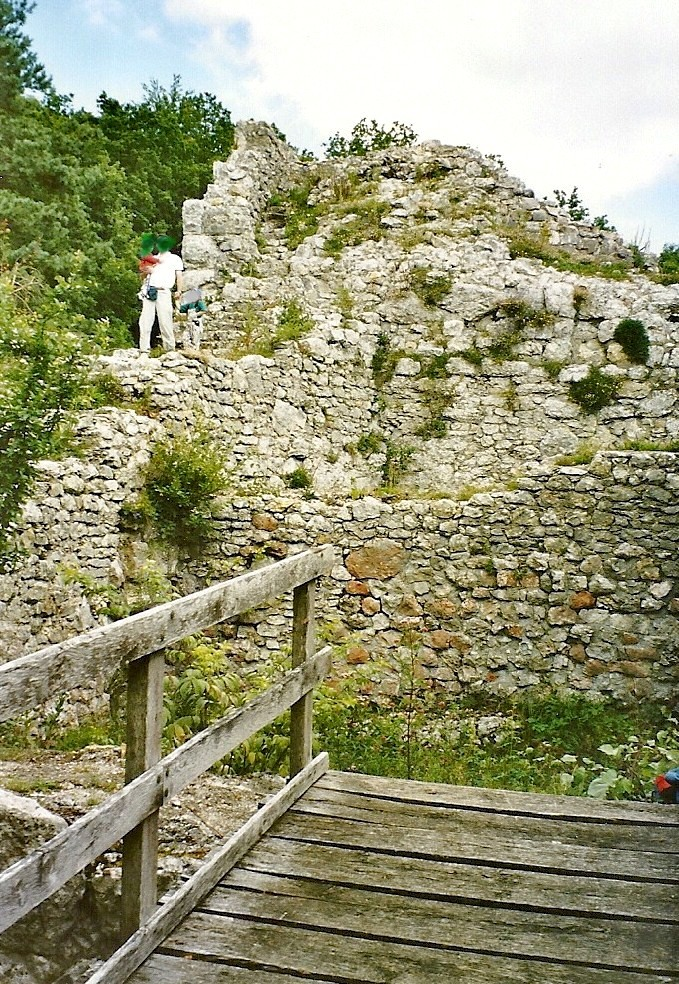

Site information
- Type: hill castle, spur castle
- Code: CH-SH
- Condition: ruin

Location
- Coordinates: 47°39′06″N 8°30′24″E
- Height: 560 m above the sea

Site history
- Built: 13th Century

Garrison information
- Occupants: Freiherren von Radegg (unverified)

The Ruins of Radegg are the ruins of a spur castle built around the year 1200 in the Canton of Schaffhausen, Switzerland and destroyed around the year 1300. It is located high above the Wangental on a spur of the Rossberg which drops off steeply on three sides in Osterfingen in the municipality of Wilchingen.

== History ==
The Ruins of Radegg were researched between the years 1923 and 1937. Nevertheless, little is known about their origin and destruction nor about those who had built the castle, the barons von Radegg. This family is first mentioned in 1188 with a reference to Heinrich Scado. A knight "Rudolf nobilis dictus Schade de Radegg" is documented around the year 1225. He is said to have had some unspecified relation to the Rheinau Abbey. In the 13th century there existed, in addition to the barons von Radegg, a second family of the same name. The bourgeois family Schad von Radegg settled in Schaffhausen in the Late Middle Ages. This makes it difficult to firmly assign individuals to the Ruins of Radegg. This baronial family died out in 1333. According to Johann Jakob Rüeger, chronicler of the history of Schaffhausen, the Randecker family was related to the lords of the castles of Burg Randeck (Landkreis Esslingen), Randenburg and Schloss Randegg.

The remains of the walls still visible today were not built before 1200. Whether or not there was a previous wooden construction on this site cannot be excluded, but also cannot be demonstrated. The castle was presumably destroyed shortly after 1300. By whom and why is unclear. On the inside of the castle, the limestone has reddened, which is suggestive of a fire. One reason for the destruction could be that the von Radegg family had attempted to protect the Rheinau Abbey from the claims of the neighboring von Krenkingen family. In addition, arrowheads and crossbow bolts were discovered during excavations.

== Layout ==
The castle was built along a line. It comprised (from east to west) a massive tower, a courtyard with a cistern and a second tower. The eastern defensive walls are up to four meters thick, whereas the southern walls facing the steep Wangental are only 2.8 meters thick. The building plan, which includes embossed corner blocks and massive stone blocks, is indicative of a construction date around 1200. The northeastern plateau is protected by ramparts and moats. In addition, there are still visible traces of earlier mining of materials.

== Tourism ==
Hiking trails lead from Osterfingen through the Wangental to Bad Osterfingen. It is a steep climb directly up to the ruins. The second path runs less steeply from Osterfingen through the Haartel Valley to the Rossberghof. From there it takes about 30 minutes to the ruins. The site is freely accessible with the proper caution. There is a rest area and fire pit at the ruins.

== The Legend of Kätterli ==
In his Legend of Kätterli, the writer Otto Uehlinger tells of a robber baron many centuries ago who lived with his wife and seven sons in Castle Radegg. The pious wife died during the birth of their first daughter. The girl was christened Kätterli. After the death of his kindhearted wife, the knight lost all sense of chivalry and decency. He and his seven sons began to plunder and loot the surrounding country. Even travelers who passed through the Wangental were not spared. Many prisoners who rotted in his dungeon were cared for and encouraged by the young, kindhearted Kätterli. One of the prisoners, an Italian nobleman, fell in love with Kätterli and, after payment of a high ransom, he was released and asked for her hand in marriage. But she did not want to leave her family and the prisoners. A year later, the nobleman allowed Kätterli to bring a blue-flowering rose bush back to Radegg Castle where she planted it. Whenever she was overcome with grief and sorrow, she would secretly visit this rose bush.

Meanwhile, the robber baron and his sons were growing ever bolder. For this reason, the warlords of Schaffhausen and the peasants of Osterfingen resolved to finally put an end to their lawlessness. One cold winter night, they snuck up to the castle and set it ablaze. As the castle was burning, the attackers saw Kätterli calling for help from a window. Before they were able to rush to her aid, the roof above collapsed upon her. To this day, Kätterli's unfulfilled love prevents her from rest. Even today, one can sometimes catch a glimpse of her on moonlit nights sitting atop the ruins of the castle where she prays for the souls of her family and awaits her redemption. Only a young man beyond reproach who can find one of the blooming blue roses and bring it to Kätterli can release her.

== Literature ==
- Thomas Bitterli-Waldvogel: Schweizer Burgenführer.
- Heinrich Boxler: Schweizer Beiträge zur Kulturgeschichte des Mittelalters. Nr. 22, 1995, S. 111–112.
- Werner Meyer (Red.): Burgen der Schweiz. Band 5: Kantone Zürich und Schaffhausen.
