= Saint Fintan =

Saint Fintan (or Saint Findan) can refer to:

- Fintan of Clonenagh, 6th- and 7th-century Irish saint
- Saint Fintan Munnu, 7th-century Irish saint, a disciple of Saint Columba
- Fintan of Rheinau (Findan, Findanus), 9th c. catholic saint and hermit, born in Leinster, active in Rheinau, Switzerland
