= Saint Ida =

Saint Ida may refer to several Catholic saints:

- Itta (died 652), wife of Pepin of Landen and mother of Saint Begga
- Saint Ita (also known as Ida, d. 570/577), an Irish nun
- Ida of Herzfeld (c. 788–813), widow of a Saxon duke
- Ida of Lorraine (1040–1113), noblewoman saint
- Ida of Toggenburg (c. 1140 – c. 1226), Swiss Christian nun
