= Muri-Gries Abbey =

Benedictine abbey in Italy

Muri-Gries Monastery
- Kloster Muri-Gries
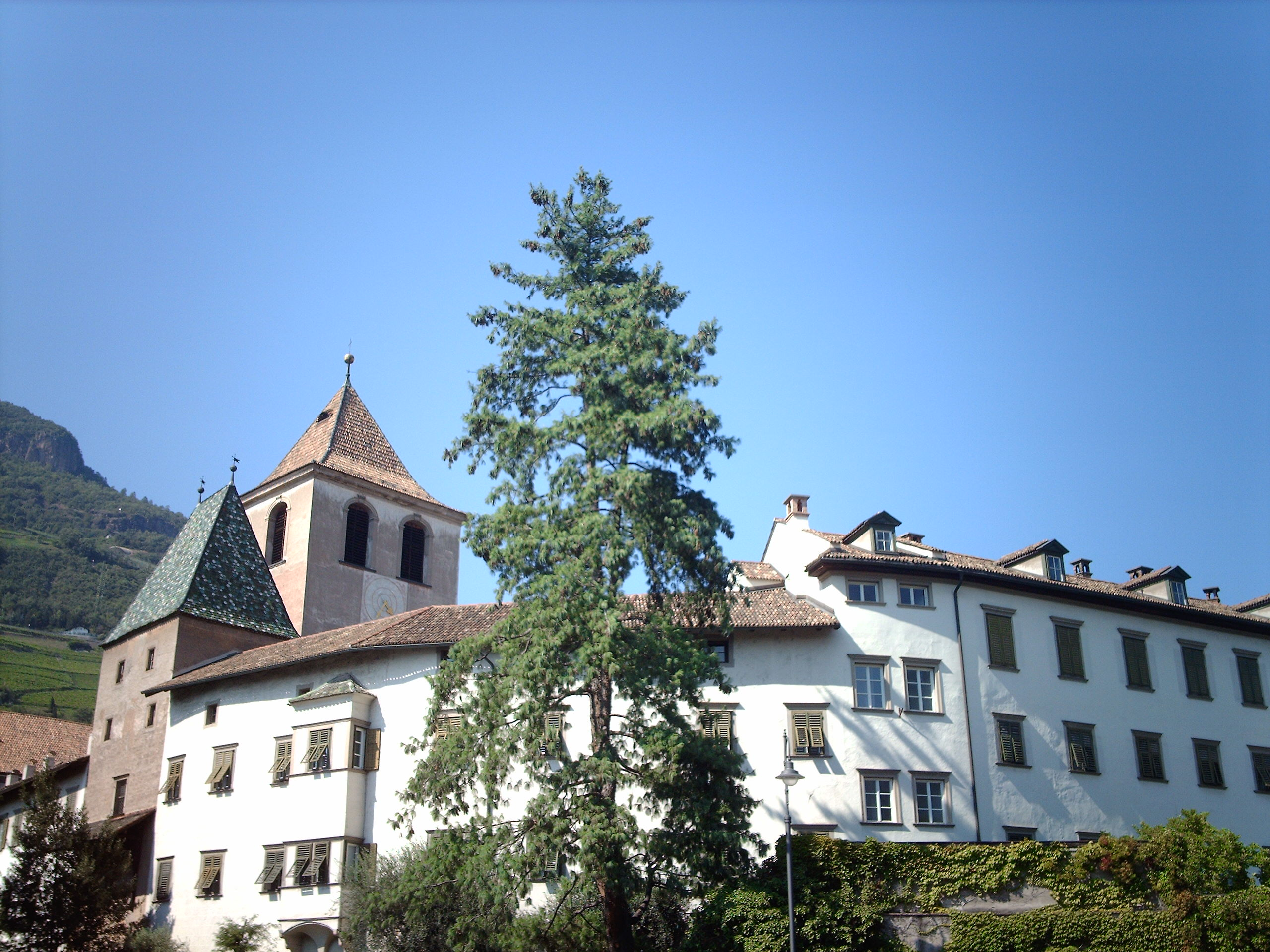
- Muri-Gries Monastery
- 46°30′12″N 11°20′06″E
- Location: Bozen, South Tyrol
- Country: Italy
- Denomination: Roman catholic
- Website: www.muri-gries.it/de

History
- Status: Convent
- Founded: 1845
- Dedication: St Augustine

Architecture
- Functional status: active

Clergy
- Abbot: Peter Stuefer

Muri-Gries Abbey (German: Benediktinerabtei Muri-Gries, Italian: Abbazia dei Benedettini di Muri-Gries) is located in Bolzano, South Tyrol, Italy and was founded in 1845 as an offshoot of the former Muri Abbey in Aargau. It is a member of the Swiss Congregation of the Benedictine Confederation, mostly known for its wine-making.

== History ==
=== Augustinians ===
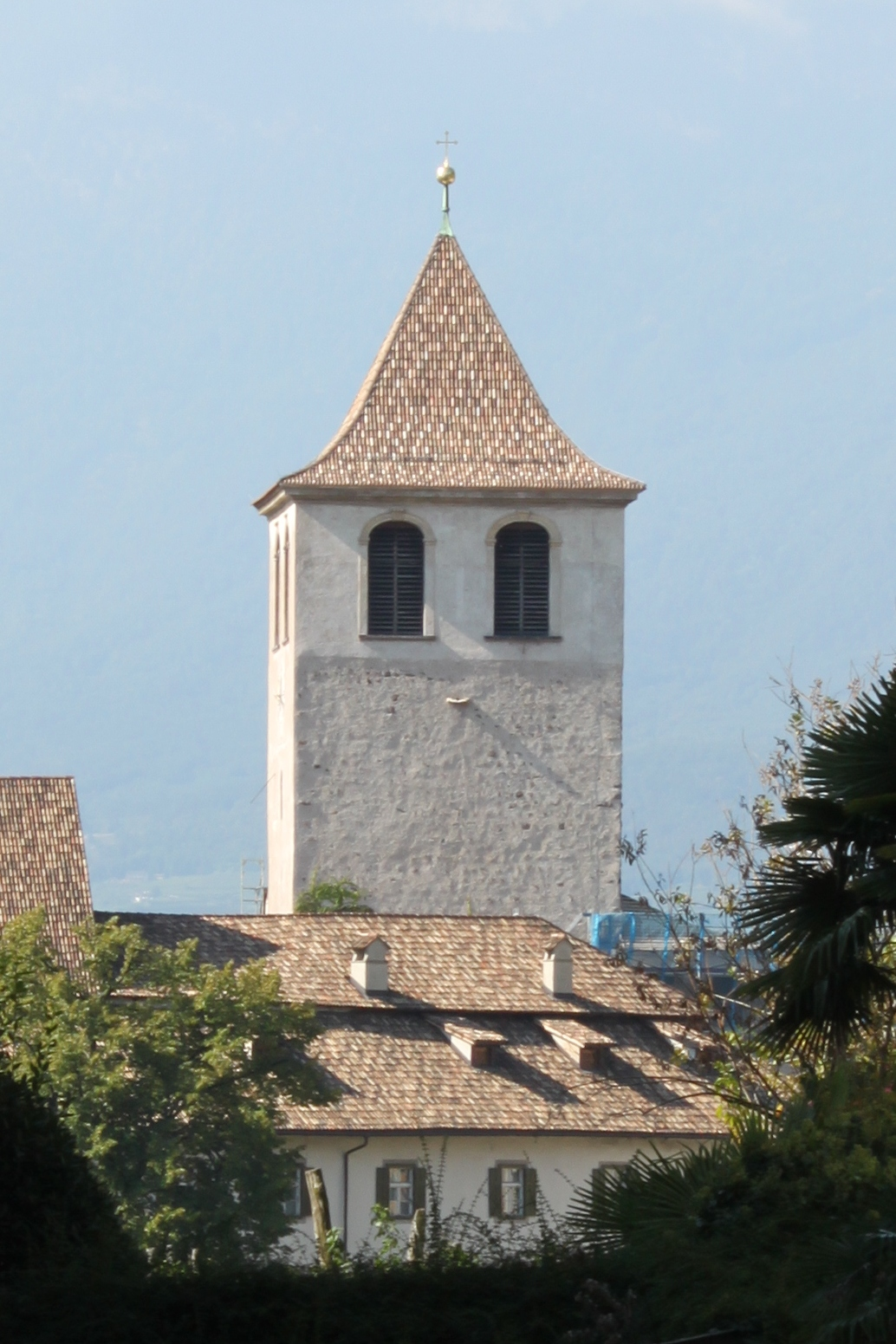
Tower of the church of Muri-Gries Abbey

An Augustinian monastery was founded in the area of Bolzano in 1163. When this convent fell victim to the floods of the Eisack river in 1406, the Habsburg Duke Leopold gave the Augustinian canons the 11th century castle of the Counts of Tyrol in today's district of Gries. A church was built in 1416. Remnants of the keep became the church's bell tower. Insurgent peasants pillaged the monastery in 1525.

The baroque St. Augustine Collegiate (Stiftskirche zum Hl. Augustinus, Chiesa Abbaziale di Sant'Agostino), decorated by painter Martin Knoller, dates to 1769. Like most monasteries, the Augustinian monastery was dissolved in 1807 after Tyrol had come to Bavaria.

=== Benedictines ===
The Benedictine abbey at Gries traces its roots to the monastery of St. Martin founded by the Hapsburgs at Muri in the Canton of Aargau in 1027, which was in turn, founded from the Abbey of St. Meinrad at Einsiedeln.

When the monasteries in Switzerland were dissolved in 1841 the abbot was invited to manage of the cantonal college at Sarnen. There the main body of the monks resided, until the Austrian Emperor, Ferdinand I, offered them a residence at Gries near Bozen in Tyrol, in an old priory formerly occupied by the Canons Regular of the Lateran which had been vacant since 1807. The Holy See concurred in the grant, and confirmed the transfer of the community of Muri to Gries by a Brief of Gregory XVI, dated 16 September 1844.

== Present day ==
Muri-Gries is a member of the Swiss Congregation of the Benedictine Confederation.

The monks managed to save a valuable part of their library from Muri. The current monastery library also contains items that can be traced back to the earlier Augustinian community. The bell tower houses the abbey's Nativity Scene Museum.

The abbey supports itself through a number of agricultural activities including vineyards, fruit orchards, and a large farm with meadows and woods. The area of the complex that once was the Augustinian seminary, now houses the abbey's winery.
