= Fischingen Abbey =

Coordinates: 47.411927°N 8.968282°E

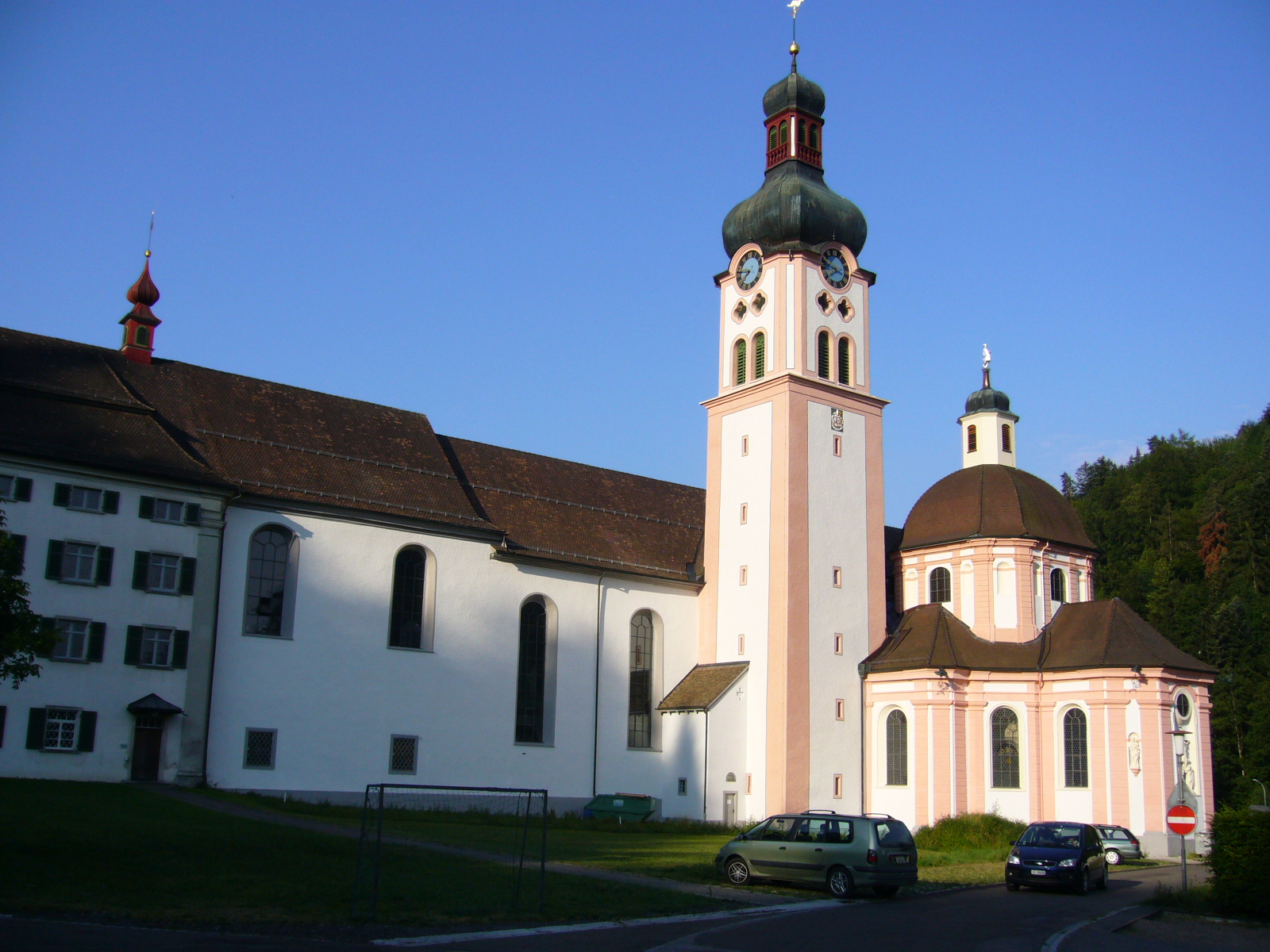
The monastic church

Fischingen Abbey (Kloster Fischingen), later Fischingen Priory, is a Benedictine monastery situated in Fischingen in the Canton of Thurgau, Switzerland, on the upper reaches of the Murg, a tributary of the Thur. It was founded in 1138, dissolved in 1848 and re-founded as a priory in 1977.

== History ==
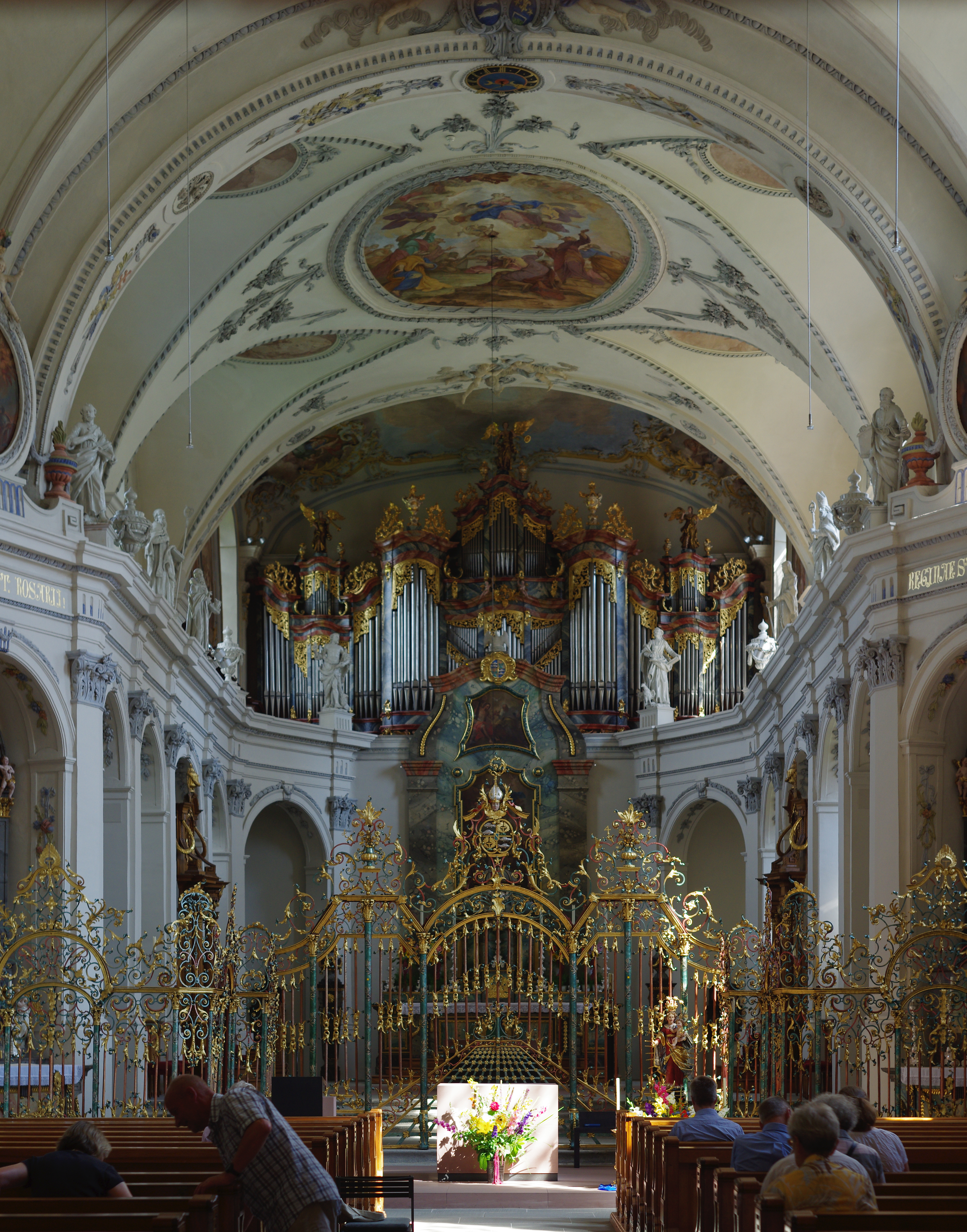
Interior of the Baroque abbey church.

The abbey was founded in 1138 by Ulrich II, Bishop of Constanz as a private episcopal monastery, with the intention that it should offer shelter and hospitality to pilgrims on their way from Constanz to Einsiedeln Abbey.

The hermit Gebino was appointed the first abbot. In only six years he had had built a bell tower, accommodation for both monks and nuns, and a guesthouse. At its high point in about 1210, Fischingen had about 150 monks and 120 nuns. The "Vogtei" (protective lordship) over the abbey belonged to the Counts of Toggenburg. Saint Idda of Toggenburg, who lived in a cell of the abbey in about 1200, is buried in a chapel off the abbey church.

From 1460 the abbey was under the authority of the administration of Thurgau in the Old Swiss Confederacy.

During the Reformation, the abbey was dissolved for several years, when in 1526 the abbot and the four remaining monks converted to the Reformed beliefs. The abbey was reopened however on the initiative of the Roman Catholic townships of the Old Swiss Confederacy.

In the 17th and 18th centuries the premises were rebuilt in the Baroque and Rococo styles. Between 1685 and 1687 a new abbey church was constructed, and in 1705 a new chapel dedicated to Saint Idda. In the 18th century part of the monastic premises was rebuilt, but could not be completed because of the abbey's accumulated debts.

Fischingen Abbey was dissolved on 27 June 1848 by the Grand Council of Thurgau.

=== 1852–1977: dissolution and abuse allegations ===
The abbey premises were sold in 1852 to a textile factory. Later a business and trade school was set up here. In 1879 the buildings were acquired by the Catholic voluntary society "Verein St. Iddazell", who established in them the St. Iddazell orphanage. During this time, several cases of abuse have been uncovered which include physical, sexual and psychological abuse during the 1950s up to the 1970s. A commission was installed, which produced a report in 2014 that largely confirmed the accusations and identified lack of oversight by the authorities as a major contributing factor to the abuse. The report also uncovered that students were used as test subjects for non-approved drugs without informed consent and without proper approval by the authorities at the psychiatric hospital in Münsterlingen, experiments which were led by Roland Kuhn. The canton of Thurgau issued an official apology for the abuse in 2014.

After the repeal in 1973 of the so-called "Article of exception" ("Ausnahmeartikel") in the Swiss constitution, which forbade the opening of new monasteries and the re-establishment of old ones, Fischingen was reopened as an independent priory in its former premises in 1977. In 1602 Fischingen joined the then newly established Swiss Congregation, now part of the Benedictine Confederation, and re-joined on its re-foundation in 1977.
