= Beinwil Abbey =

Benedictine monastery in Beinwil, Switzerland

Coordinates: 47°21′44″N 7°35′14″E

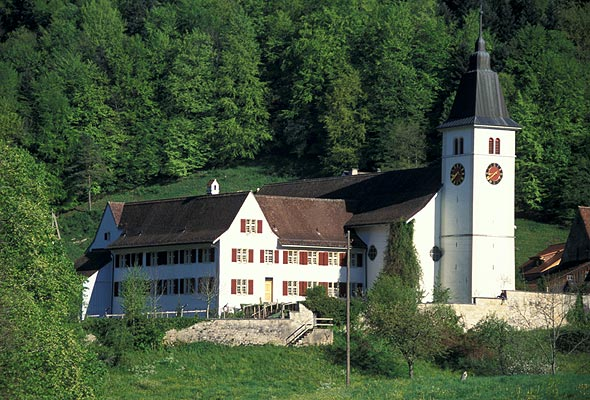
Beinwil Abbey

Beinwil Abbey (Kloster Beinwil) was a Benedictine monastery in Beinwil in the Canton of Solothurn in Switzerland.

== History ==
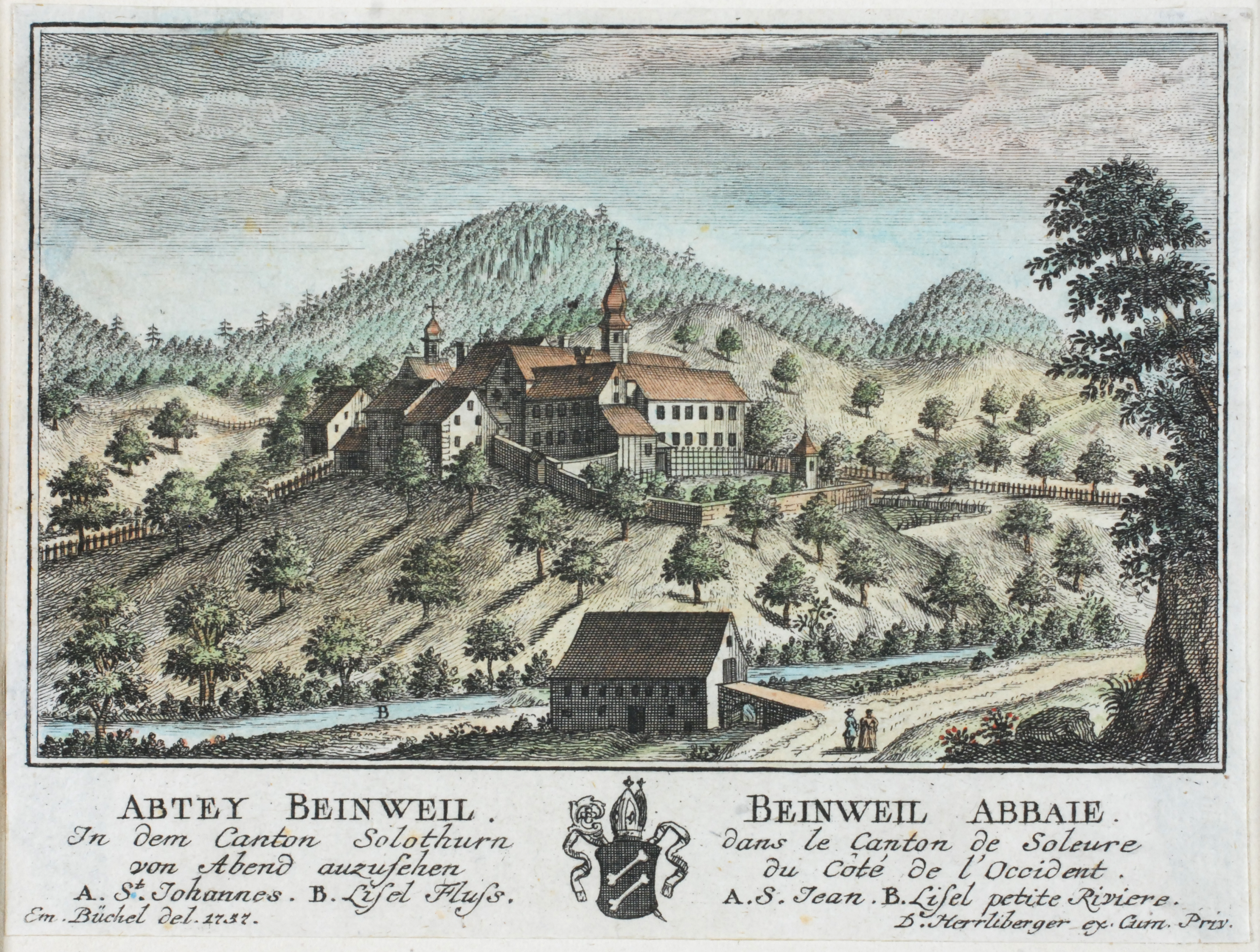
Copper engraving on paper showing the abbey, about 1757.

It was founded around 1100, probably by the local nobility and was first mentioned in 1147. After conflicts arising from the territorial claims of the towns of Solothurn and Basel against the Counts of Thierstein, who acted as the abbey's Vögte (reeve), it was burnt down in 1445. After Beinwil had been taken over by Solothurn in 1519, the authorities of the city impounded much of the abbey's possessions.

By the 16th century only a few monks were left in the abbey, and it was formally dissolved in 1554. A small community remained, first in the care of the Einsiedeln Abbey from 1589. And then, from 1622, under the care of the Rheinau Abbey. As no monastic revival could be achieved due to its remoteness, it was decided to re-settle the community to the newly founded Mariastein Abbey nearby at an important pilgrimage site in 1648. In anticipation of this, Mariastein became a member of the Swiss Congregation, now part of the Benedictine Confederation. From the late 18th century, it was finally possible to revive the Beinwil Abbey out of Mariastein, and during this period the church and the monastic premises were rebuilt.

The abbey was however dissolved in 1874 by a plebiscite during the so-called Kulturkampf, and the community of Beinwil went into exile.

== Present day ==
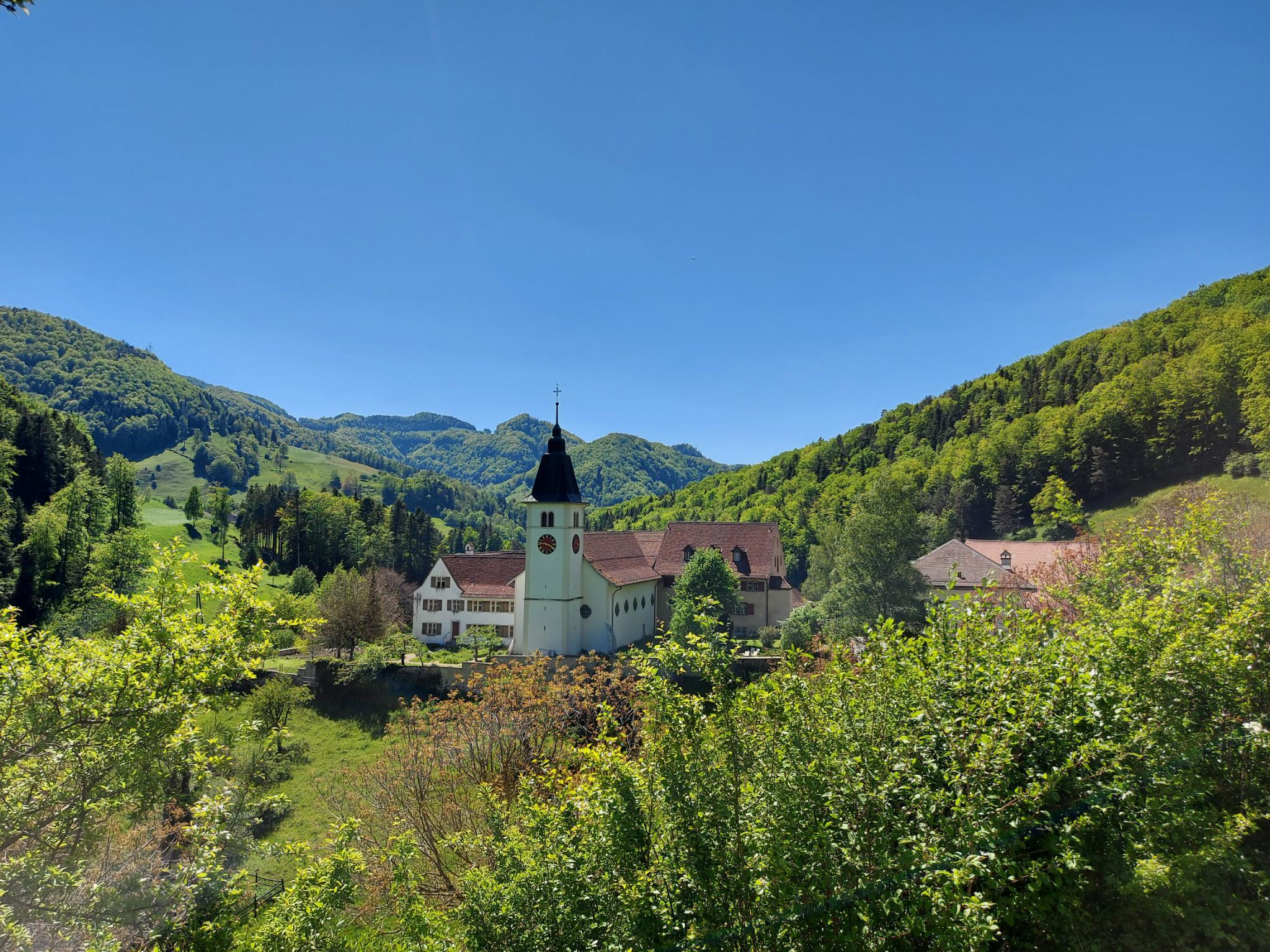
Abbey Beinwil and surrounding Jura hills

The abbey church, dedicated to Saint Vincent of Saragossa was destroyed by fire in 1978. It has now been comprehensively restored and a high altar has been installed, dated about 1700, from Bellwald. Until 2019, the former abbey was used as a ecumenical conference and retreat centre. In January 2019 it became an orthodox monastery with four monks (as of 2022). The local catholic parish continues to use the abbey church, with the monastery using the crypt for their liturgy. About 12 rooms are available for visitors for short term visits. In 2023 the Orthodox monastery already counted 2,200 visitors. In March 2025, the Russian-Orthodox priests' convention of Zürich published a distancing statement in which they questioned the canonical affiliation of the monastery.
