= Ida of Toggenburg =

Catholic saint

Saint Ida of Toggenburg
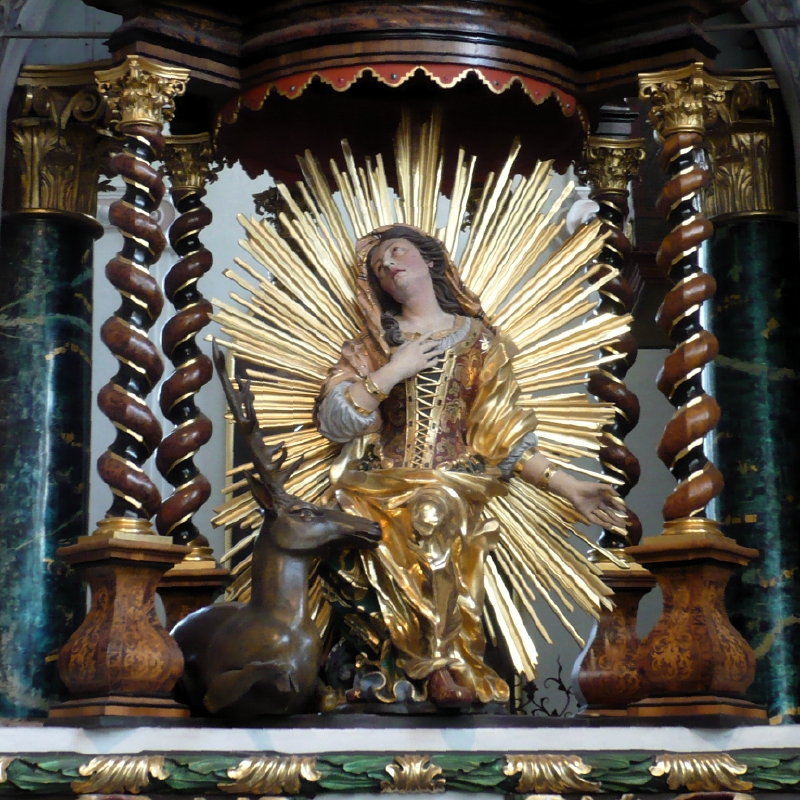
- Born: c. 1140; Kirchberg
- Died: 3 November 1226; Fischingen
- Venerated in: Catholic Church
- Beatified: 1724 by Pope Benedict XIII
- Feast: 3 November
- Attributes: Deer, or a deer with 12 candles, crow
- Patronage: Headaches, pregnancy complaints, for finding escaped cattle

Ida of Toggenburg (c. 1140 – 3 November 1226) (also: Idda, Ita, Itha, Itta, Ydda, Judith and Gutta of Fischingen) is a Swiss Christian nun, venerated as a saint in the Diocese of Constance especially in Fischingen, Switzerland. She is the protagonist of many stories and legends in the local culture.

== Hagiography ==
There is no written record of a cult in Fischingen Abbey before the 15th century. The first humanist Albrecht von Bonstetten wrote several "Lives of Saints" that the oldest dates back from 1481.

According to legend, Ida was the daughter of a Count of Kirchberg near Ulm and was married to a Count of Toggenburg (in a document after 1562 he was named Heinrich). According to legend, a raven stole Ida's wedding ring. The ring was found in the bird's nest by a bird catcher. When her husband noticed the ring on the bird catcher's hand, he accused Ida of infidelity. He had the bird catcher killed and threw Ida out of his castle window. However, due to her innocence, God miraculously saved her and Ida fled the castle. By a divine miracle later she returned home and retreated to a cave where she found in her hermitage, the error was cleared up, but Ida wanted to continue dedicating her life to God as a hermit. When she went to the nearby Fischinge monastery during the mass, a stag ran ahead, and it had twelve rings in it. A huntsman went there and told his grandfather. Later, her repentant husband had a hermitage built for her in Au, near the Fischingen monastery, where she lived until her death on 3 November 1226 and died in the name of holiness and was venerated as a saint before 1410.

In the 12th century there was an Ida, who was married to a Diethelm of Toggenburg and a second marriage to Gottfried of Marstetten. It is hypothesised that she was Countess of Homburg and founded the cult tradition through her holy life.

== Cult ==
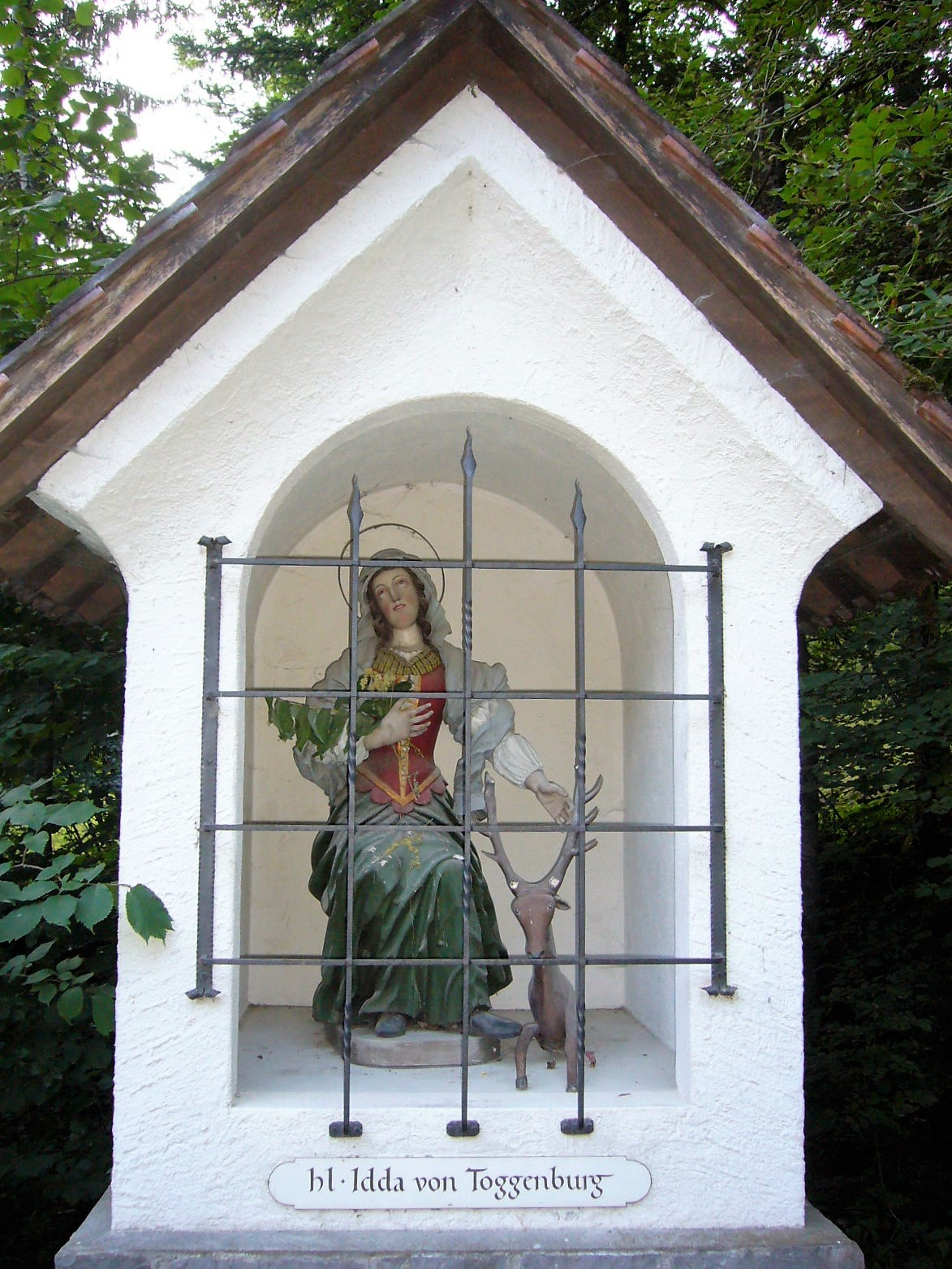
Wayside shrine of Saint Ida in Au, Fischingen

Ida of Toggenburg is represented as a nun, with a crow or a deer, whose antlers shine. It is said that he often led her to the monastery church. Her memory is celebrated on November 3.

In 1496 a monumental table tomb was dedicated to the saint from the newly established Fischingen monastery, who even expelled Our Lady from the monastery's secrecy in the 18th century. In 1580 an Ida brotherhood was founded. Veneration for Ida was limited to Fischingen and its environs until around 1600, after which it extended to the county of Kirchberg. Ida is also the patron saint of the Bauen chapel, on Lake Lucerne, where it is documented for the first time in 1561 at the Chapel of Saint Ida.

In 1704 the legend of Ida was reconstructed by the abbot of Fisching Franz Troger with local data (Lake Lucerne):

- birth: 1156
- marriage: 1179
- fall from the fortress: 1191
- stay at the Abbey of Fischingen: 1218–1226.

In 1724 Pope Benedict XIII granted her cult for the entire Diocese of Constance. She is also venerated to this day in the Diocese of Basel as the patroness of runaway cattle. A little south of Fischingen Abbey, on a 976-meter-high mountain in the area of the Kirchberg community, there is a small pilgrimage site, St. Iddaburg (966 m).

== Legends and reception ==
- A legend of Ida in the German language (after Bonstetten) was printed in the legend Der Heiligen Leben published by Sebastian Brant in 1510 (edited by Williams-Krapp in the magazine for the history of the Upper Rhine 1982, pp. 71–80).
- Froben Christoph von Zimmer reports in the Zimmerische Chronik (written between 1559 and 1566) of the Counts of Kirchberg and Ita von Dockenburg, née Countess of Kirchberg. (Zimmerische Chronik Volume 1, p. 346, legend on page 352).
- As number 513 (most recent count), the Brothers Grimm—based on the mention in the Swiss history of Johannes von Müller—included a short text about Ida in their German sagas.
- Ida von Toggenburg is the main character in Thomas Bornhauser's novel Ida von Tockenburg, which was published in Schwäbisch Hall in 1840.
- Edifying writings about Ida appeared in the 19th century, including Itha, Countess of Toggenburg. A very beautiful and instructive story from the 12th century told for all good people. A complement for Genevieve of Brabant, published in Regensburg in 1880.

== Gallery ==
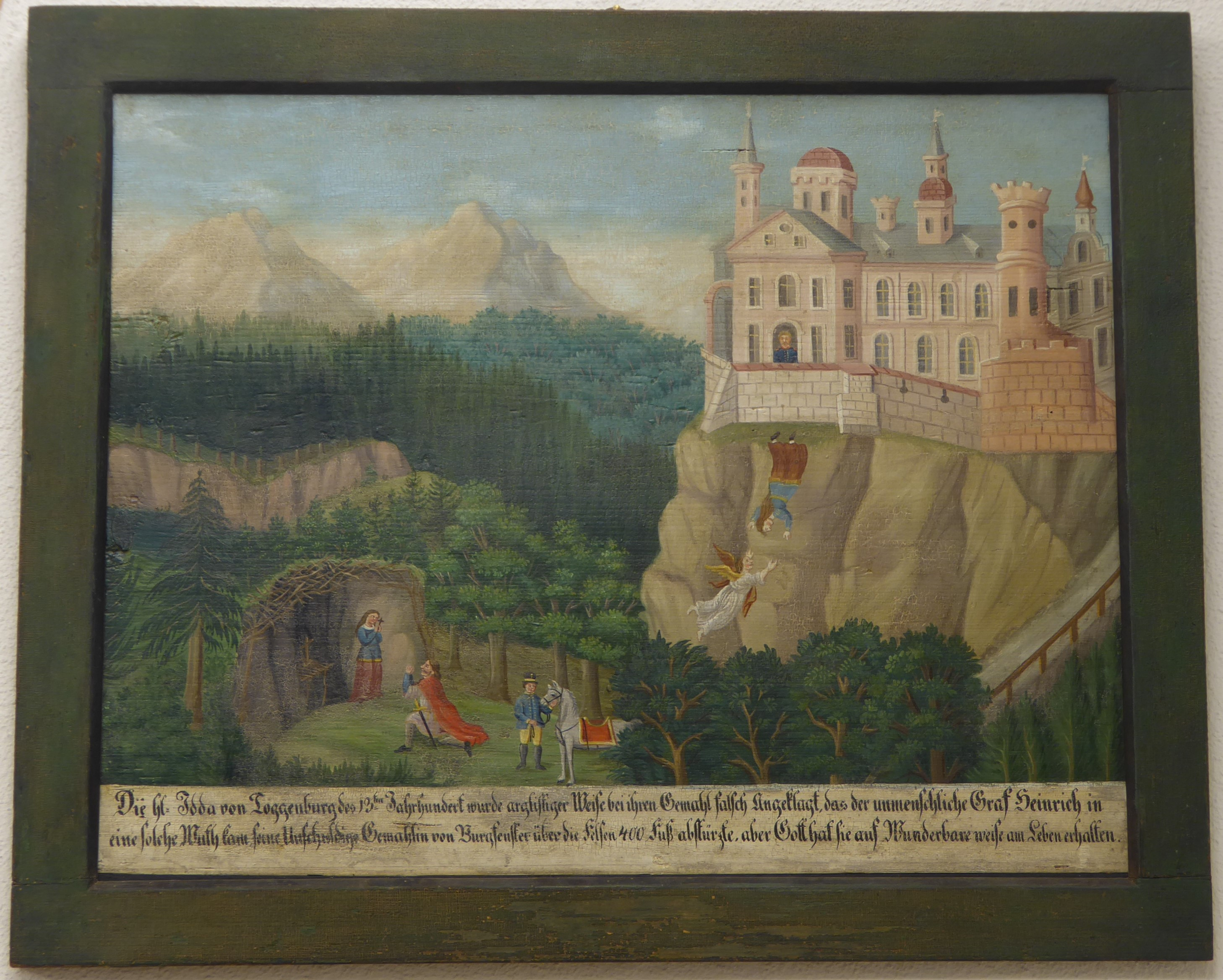
Ida is pushed down from the castle. Picture in the Toggenburg Museum Lichtensteig

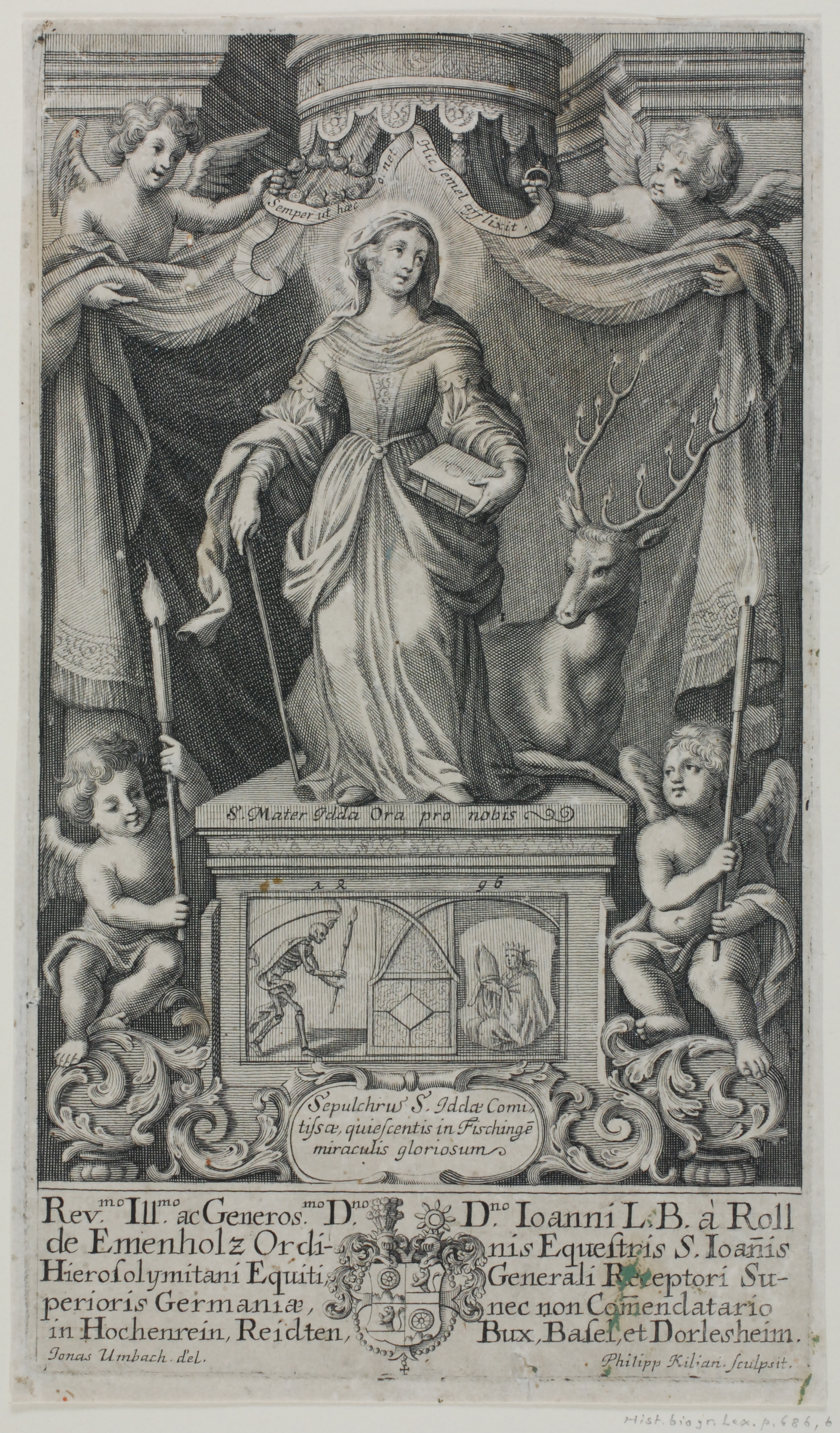
Ida of Toggenburg, copper engraving around 1700

== Bibliography ==
- Büchler, Hans (1993). Das Toggenburg [The Toggenburg] (in German). Niggli. ISBN 3-7212-0256-2.
- Collins, David J. (2008). "The Holy Recluses". Reforming Saints: Saints' Lives and Their Authors in Germany, 1470-1530. Oxford Studies in Historical Theology (in German). Oxford: Oxford University Press. pp. 51–74.
- Canisius, SJ, Peter (1996). I fioretti di Santa Ida di Fischingen [The Florets of Saint Ida of Fischingen] (in Italian). Translation introduction and appendix by Ilsemarie Brandmair Dallera. Preface and lexicological tables by Roberto Busa, SJ. Brescia: Morcelliana.
- Meyer, Bruno (1974–1975). "Die heilige Ita von Fischingen". Thurgauische Beiträge zur vaterländischen Geschichte [Thurgauische Contributions to Patriotic History] [The Holy Ita of Fischingen] (in German). Vol. CXII. pp. 21–97. doi:10.5169/seals-585258.
- Michael Tilly (1990). "Ida von Toggenburg, auch: Idda, Itha, Itta, Ydda, Judith und Gutta". In Bautz, Friedrich Wilhelm (ed.). Biographisch-Bibliographisches Kirchenlexikon (BBKL) (in German). Vol. 2. Hamm: Bautz. col. 1251. ISBN 3-88309-032-8. (in German)
- William-Krapp, Werner. "Ida von Toggenburg". Verfasserlexikon [Author's Lexicon] [Ida of Toggenburg] (in German). Vol. IV. pp. 359–361.
