= Swiss Congregation =

Grouping of Benedictine monasteries in Switzerland

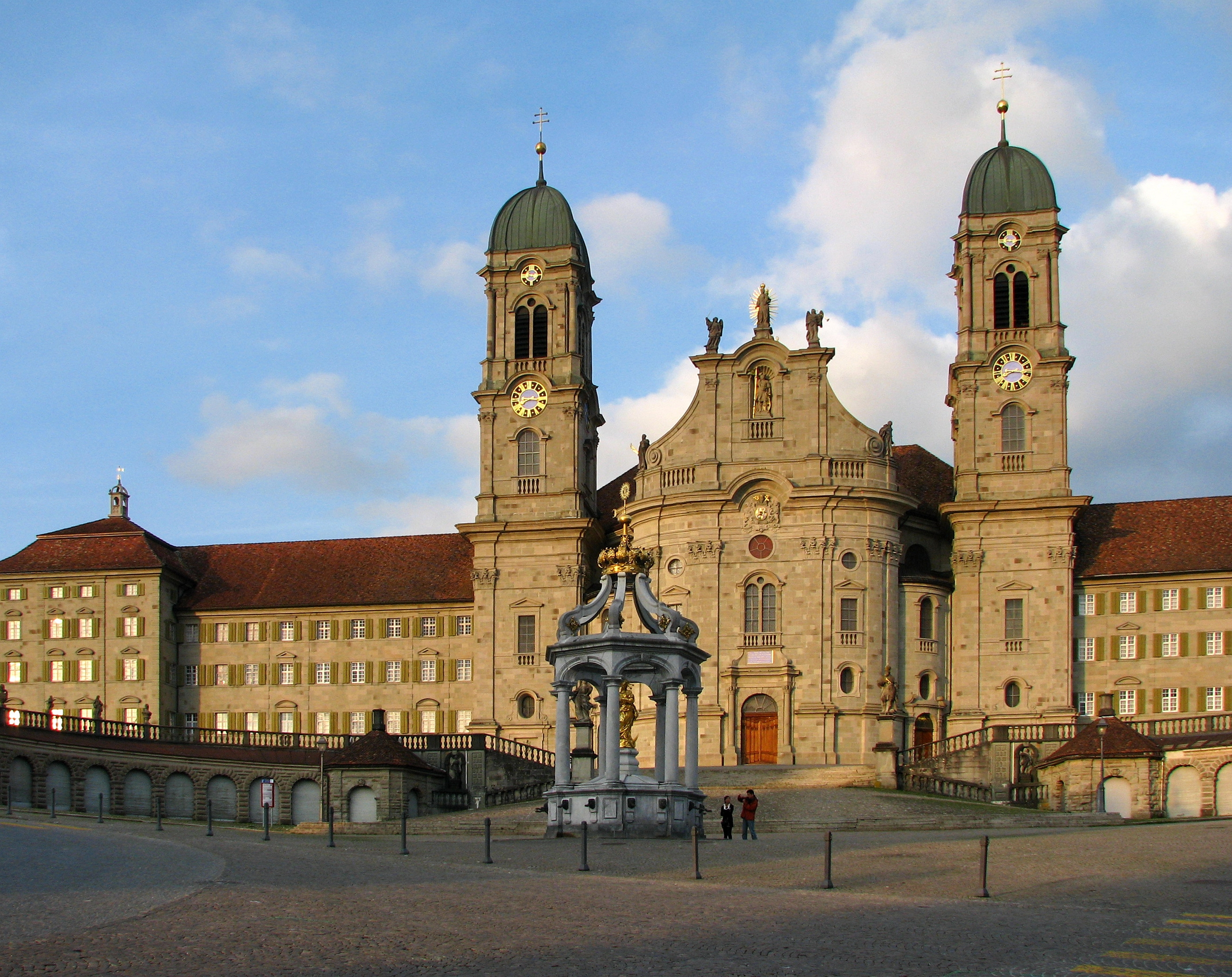
Kloster Einsiedeln

The Swiss Congregation of the Benedictine Confederation is a grouping of Benedictine monasteries in Switzerland or with significant historical Swiss connections.

== Foundation ==
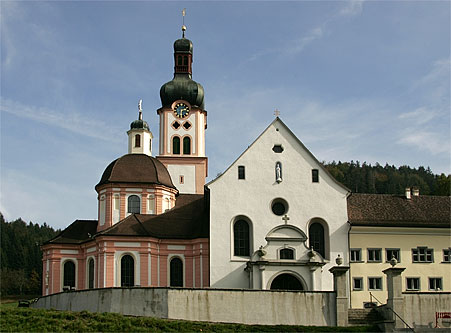
Kloster Fischingen

The congregation was founded, at the urging of the Papal legate to Switzerland, in 1602, with a significant reform agenda. Of the nine Benedictine monasteries in Switzerland which had survived the Reformation, seven had joined by 1604. Disentis Abbey was prevented at first by considerations of the sensitive politico-religious situation in Graubünden, but joined in 1617. Beinwil Abbey had been dissolved in 1554, but the community was still together, and at last, after it had been decided that a re-foundation would take place at Mariastein, joined in 1647.

As at 1647, therefore, the congregation included all the extant Benedictine monasteries in Switzerland:

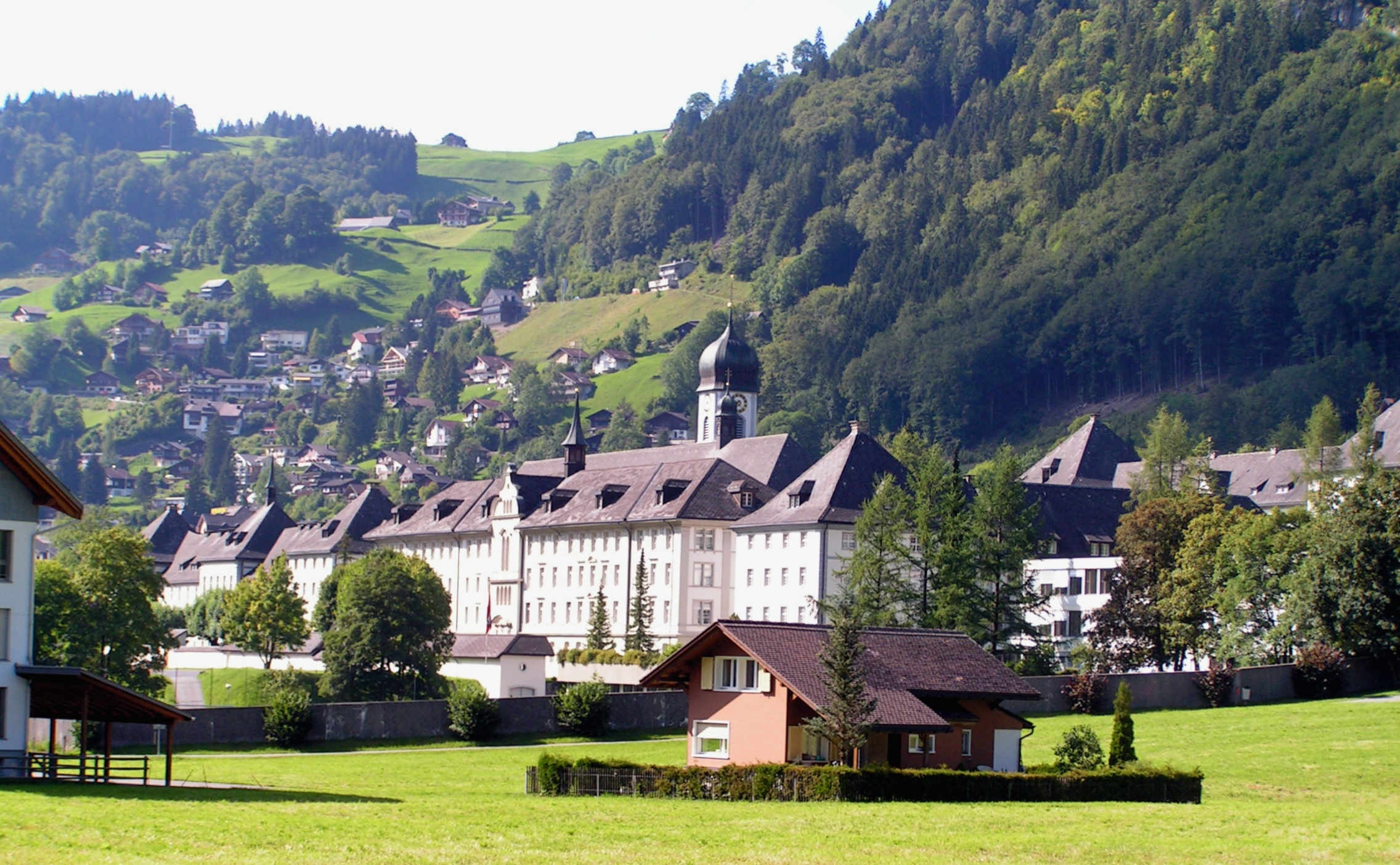
Engelberg kloster

- Einsiedeln Abbey (May 1602)
- Fischingen Abbey (May 1602)
- Muri Abbey (May 1602)
- St. Gall Abbey (May 1602)
- Pfäfers Abbey (Nov 1602)
- Rheinau Abbey (1603)
- Engelberg Abbey (1604)
- Disentis Abbey (1617)
- Mariastein Abbey (1647)

== Changes ==
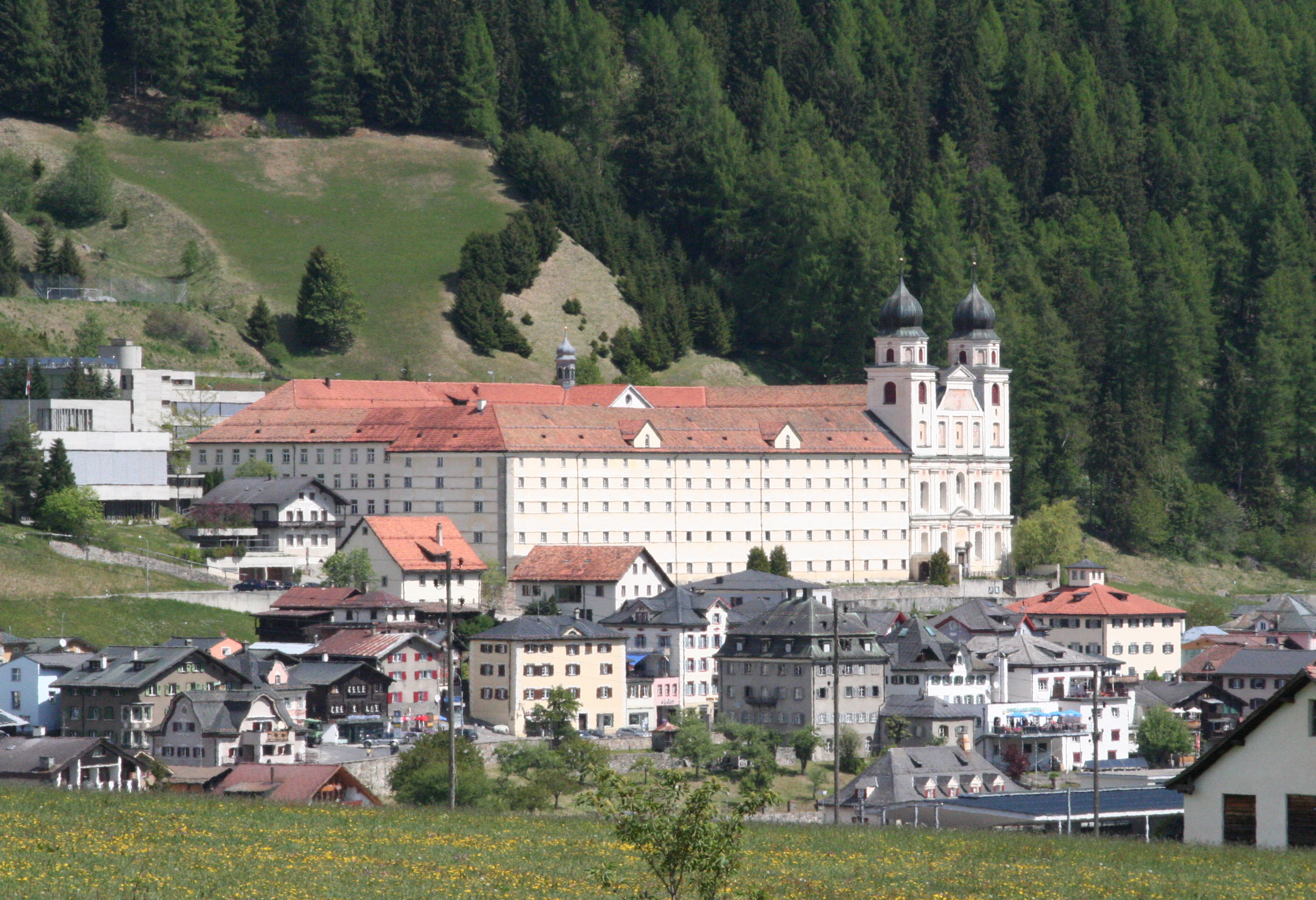
Kloster Disentis

The fortunes of Roman Catholic establishments in Switzerland were turbulent, especially in the 19th century. All were dissolved as a consequence of the French Revolution in 1798, but were restored by Napoleonic decree in 1803, with the exception of St. Gall, where the Prince-Abbot refused to make the necessary political concessions. The politics of the Swiss cantons brought about the dissolution of Pfäfers (1838), Muri (1841), Fischingen (1848) and Rheinau (1863), of which Muri was re-founded in 1845 at Gries in what is now the Italian province of South Tyrol and Fischingen not until 1977, as an independent priory.

The "Kulturkampf" caused the dissolution of Mariastein in 1874/75. The exiled community sought refuge first in France, and, exiled again in 1901, in Austria, where they settled at Bregenz, only to be deported yet again in 1941, by the Gestapo. The Swiss government then allowed them as political refugees to re-occupy their old monastery, which was however not re-established as such until 1973.

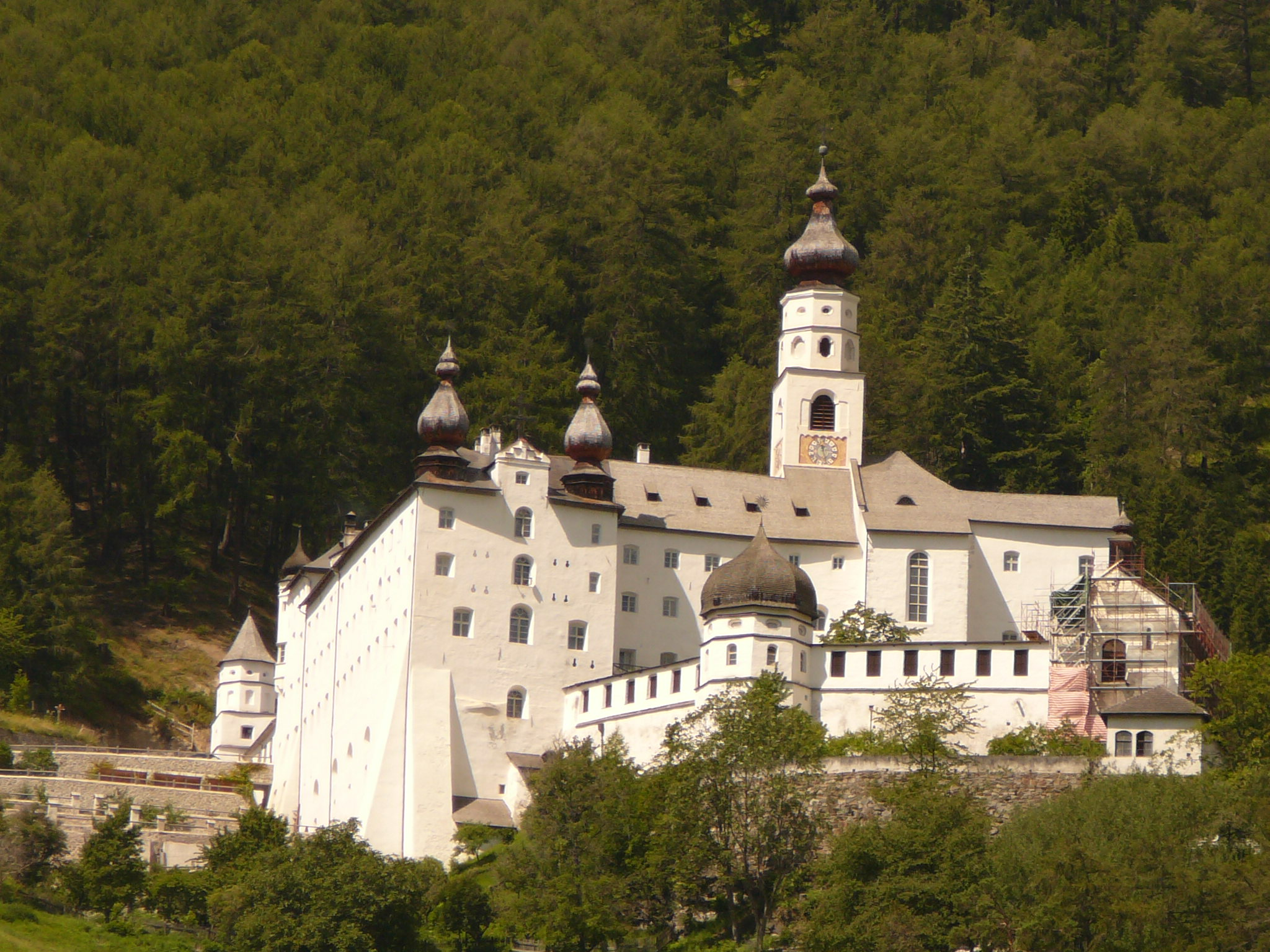
Kloster Marienberg

The outlook for Swiss Roman Catholics during the "Kulturkampf" was so bleak that Einsiedeln and Engelberg began a programme of establishing new religious houses in the United States of America so that the remaining monasteries and nunneries in Switzerland would have a refuge if they were all exiled. Eventually the crisis passed, but the new foundations took on a life of their own as the Swiss-American Congregation of the Benedictine Confederation.

Political changes outside Switzerland brought the addition of Marienberg Abbey in South Tyrol, which transferred from the Austrian Congregation in 1931.

== Present membership ==
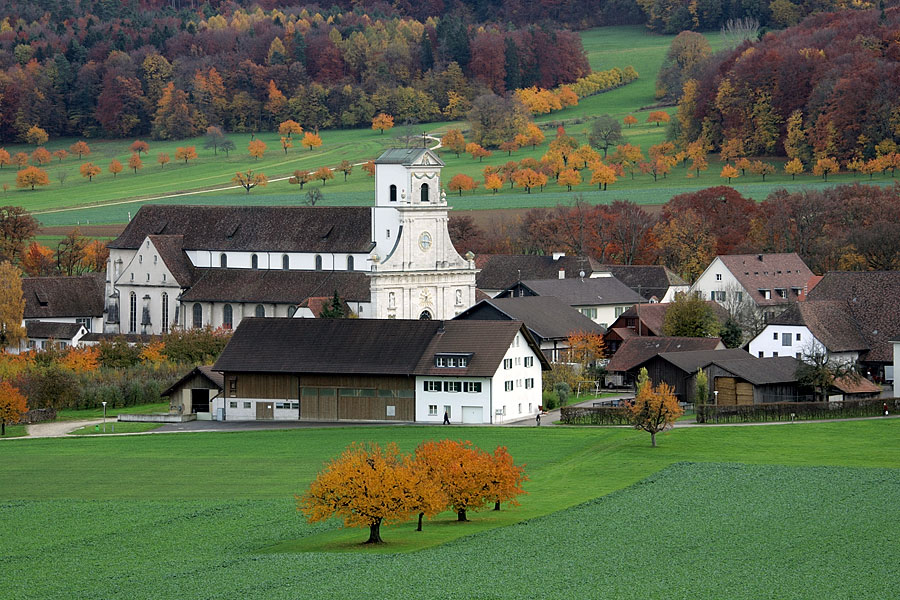
Kloster Mariastein

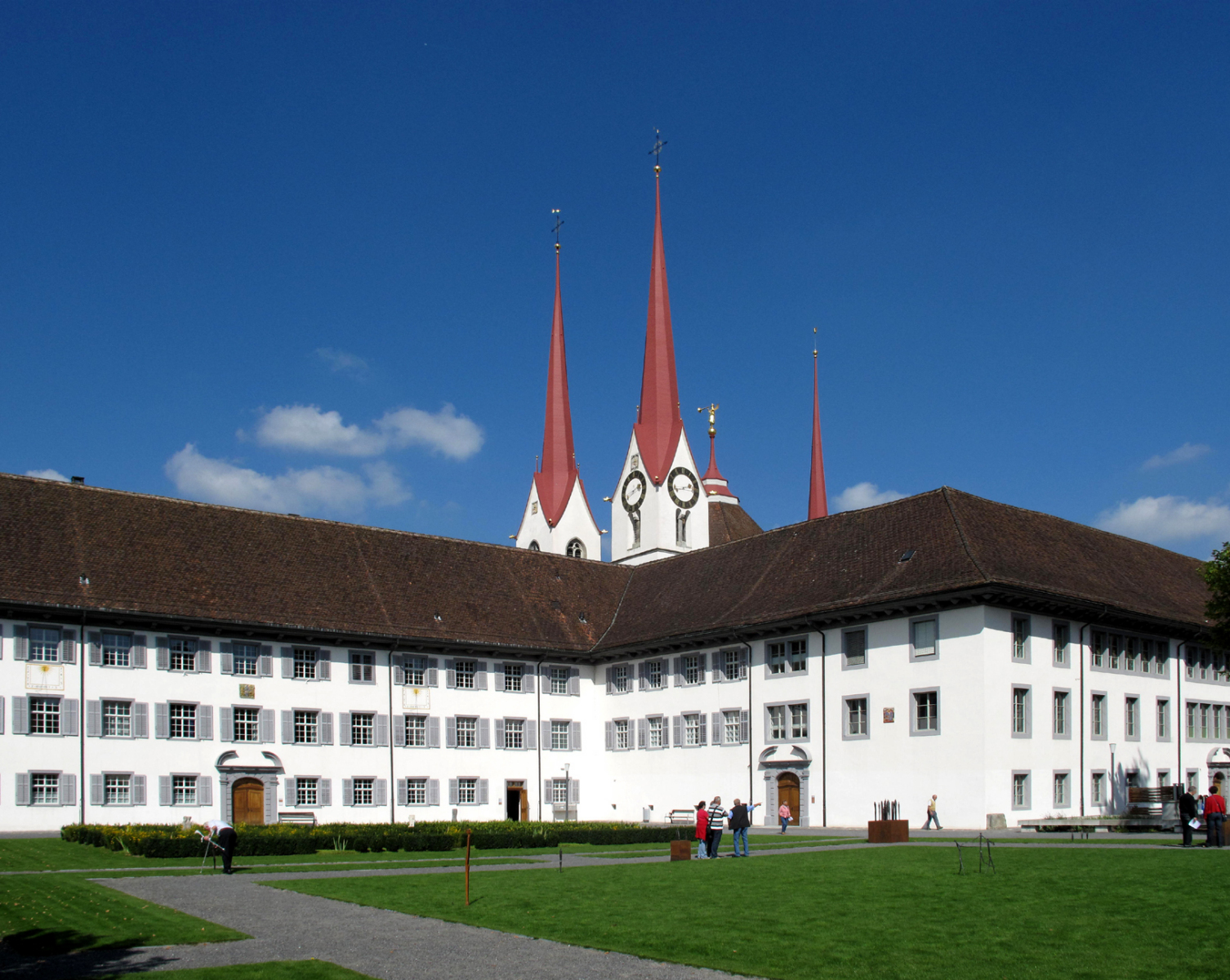
Murikloster

The member houses of the Swiss Congregation are presently as follows:

- Einsiedeln Abbey
- Fischingen Priory (re-founded in 1977)
- Engelberg Abbey
- Disentis Abbey
- Marienberg Abbey (since 1931; in South Tyrol)
- Mariastein Abbey (re-founded in 1970/71)
- Muri-Gries Abbey (since 1845 in South Tyrol; head of the congregation)
