= Mariastein Abbey =

Coordinates: 47°28′34″N 7°29′32″E

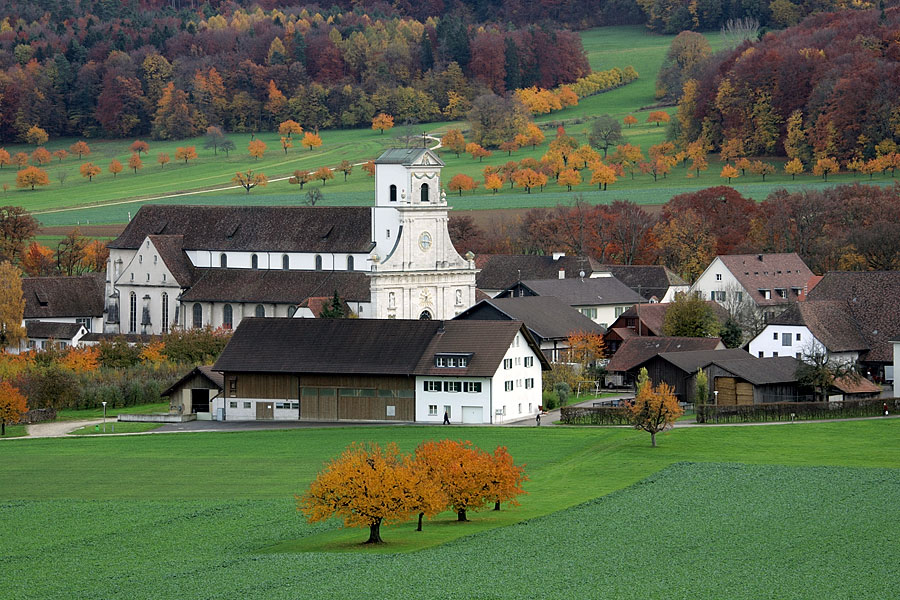
Mariastein Abbey

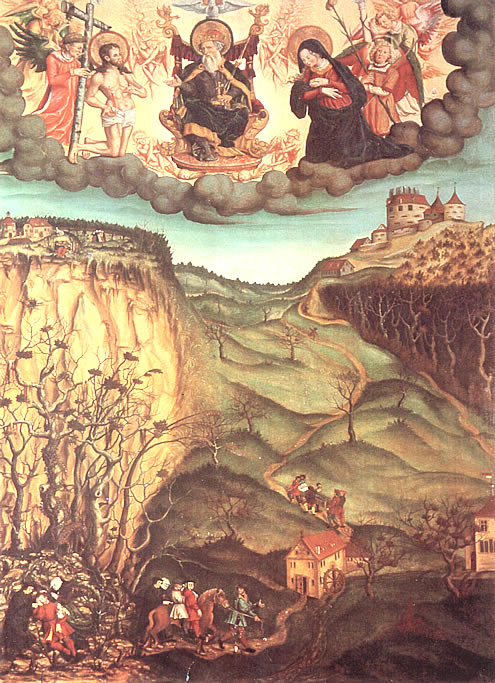
Miracle of Mariastein, by Meister E.S., 1543, in Mariastein Abbey church

Mariastein Abbey (Kloster Mariastein) is a Benedictine monastery in Metzerlen-Mariastein in the Canton of Solothurn, Switzerland.

Mariastein, after Einsiedeln, is the second most important place of pilgrimage in Switzerland. Over the Chapel of Grace ("Gnadenkapelle") now stands a late Gothic three-aisled basilica. The interior is Baroque and the entrance facade classicist.

== History ==
Aerial view (1950)

Mariastein originated as a place of pilgrimage in the late 14th century, with the legend of a miracle of the Blessed Virgin Mary; a stone chapel was first definitely mentioned in 1434. The Augustinian hermits of Basel had charge of the site.

In 1648 Mariastein Abbey was established here with the relocation of the remnants of the failing community at Beinwil, and the foundation of the Benedictine abbey to house them. The abbey was extremely successful both as a revived Benedictine community and as promoters and custodians of the pilgrimage site, which assumed at that period its present importance.

The abbey was secularized twice, after 1792, because of the French Revolution from 1791 onwards. Since in France many citizens did not approve of the preachers there, they travelled to Mariastein and it was there where their French children received their baptism or marriages were sealed. To this the French government opposed and threatened to sack the monastery, which led the Cantonal Government to send a civil governor to lead over the abbey, who prohibited public masses. In 1798 troops commanded by the French General Balthazar Alexis Henri Schauenburg sacked the monastery and sent the monks into exile. Only in 1802 the monks were permitted to return and re-establish the abbey. As a result of a conflict between the state and the Roman Catholic Church, the monks were obliged to seek refuge in 1874; first in France, at Delle. In 1902 they were expelled as a result of legal changes in France, for a short time at Dürrnberg near Hallein in Austria, and finally in Bregenz, also in Austria. When the monastery at Bregenz was closed down by the Gestapo, the monks returned to Mariastein, where they were granted asylum in 1941. After a referendum in 1970, the abbey was re-established on the 21 June 1971 with a ceremony during which the Landamman of the Canton of Solothurn Willi Ritschard returned the legal rights over the monastery to Abbot Basilius Niederbegrer.

The abbey has been a member of the Swiss Congregation, now a part of the Benedictine Confederation, since 1647.

== See also ==
- Beinwil Abbey
- Catholic Church in Switzerland
