= Rheinau Abbey =

Abbey in Zurich, Switzerland

Coordinates: 47°38′32″N 8°36′30″E

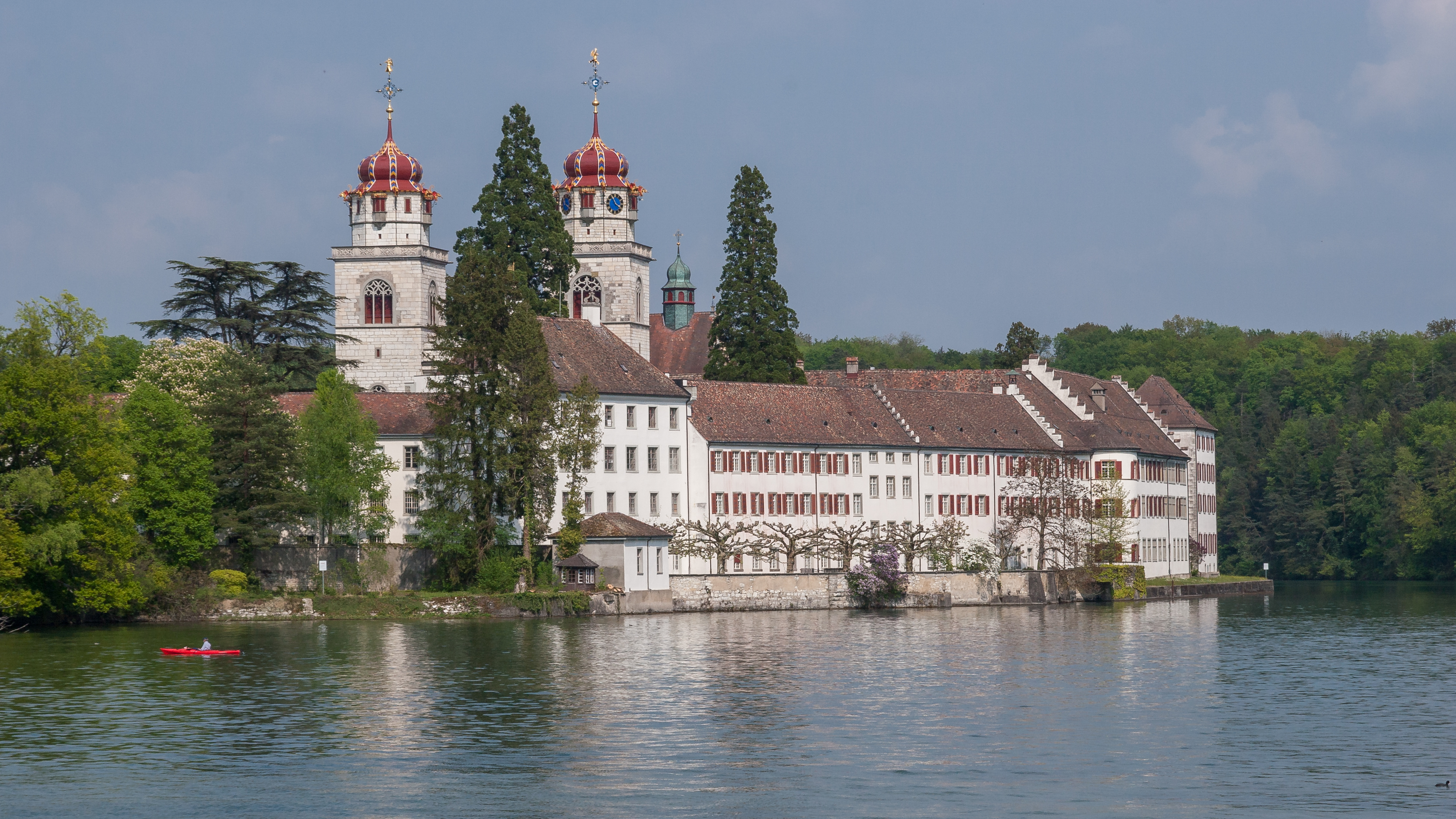
Former Abbey at the Rhine

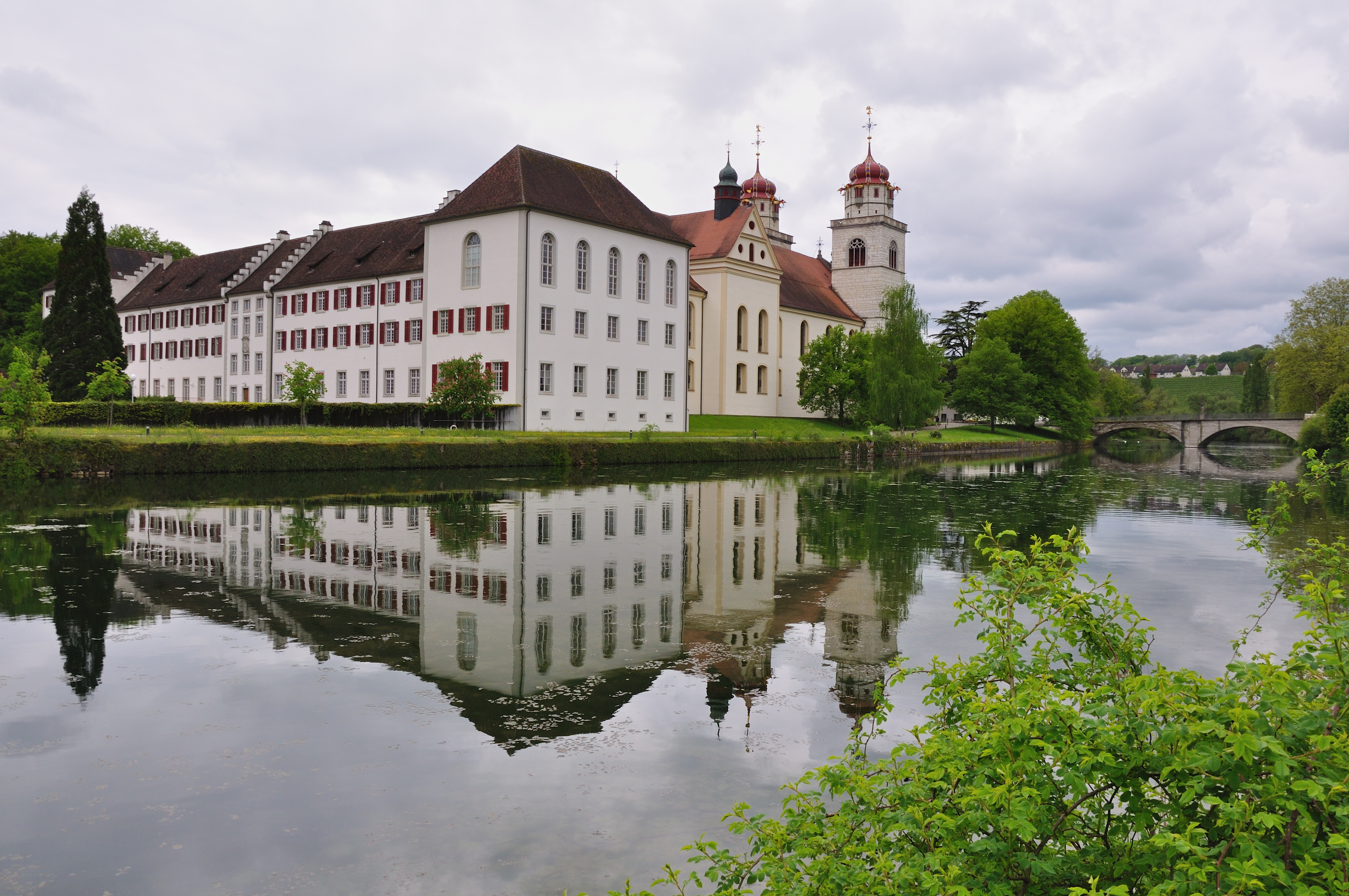
Rheinau Abbey

Rheinau Abbey (Kloster Rheinau) was a Benedictine monastery in Rheinau in the canton of Zurich, Switzerland, founded in about 778 and suppressed in 1862. It is located on an island in the Rhine.

== History ==
The foundation of the abbey, on a strategically sheltered bend of the Rhine, is supposed to have taken place in about 778. In the ninth century, the community number forty-three, about half of whom were ordained priests. St. Findan was from Ireland; after escaping Viking slavers, he lived at the abbey as a hermit for twenty-two years.

In 1114 a Romanesque basilica was dedicated here and in 1120 the still extant archive begun. The early history of the abbey, like that of many others, consists of an alternation between generous endowments and privileges from the Holy Roman Emperors, and oppression and fraud from the "Vögte" (lords protector). In 1126 Count Rudolf of Lenzburg founded the adjoining settlement of Rheinau. The abbey's scriptorium flourished in the twelfth century.

Against the increasingly aggressive territorial claims of the Counts of Sulz the abbey made a treaty in 1455 with the Old Swiss Confederacy, which was intended to protect it against further attacks by the noble families of the Klettgau. In 1529 the Reformation swept in from Zürich and overwhelmed the abbey, which was abandoned shortly afterwards. It was re-established however in 1532, and became a centre of the Counter-Reformation. A pipe organ was built at the abbey by Daniel Hayl the elder in the years 1592–1594.

In the 18th century under Abbot Gerold II Zurlauben, Rheinau Abbey, like St. Gallen, enjoyed a late resurgence. Abbot Gerold II Zurlauben had the monastic complex (in construction up to 1744) magnificently re-built in the Baroque style, much as they appear today. Franz Beer worked on the abbey church which was re-dedicated 1710.

During the turmoil of the French Revolution and the French invasion of Switzerland in 1798, the abbey was temporarily suspended, but restored in 1803. The abbey's territory with the little town of Rheinau were added to the newly restored Canton of Zürich, which placed it under cantonal supervision in 1834 and from 1836 prevented it from accepting new novices. In 1862 the cantonal council decreed the dissolution of the abbey.

From 1603 until its dissolution the abbey was a member of the Swiss Congregation, now part of the Benedictine Confederation.

== After dissolution ==
In 1867 in the abbey buildings a cantonal hospital and nursing home were set up. The later cantonal psychiatric clinic that developed here was closed in 2000, since then the buildings have stood empty.

== List of abbots ==
- Gozbert (837–850)
- Antwarth, 850
- Wolven I, 858–878
- Wiehram, 879–888
- Gozbert, 888–912
- Rupertus, 912–934
- Conrad I, 934–975
- Wipract, 975–977
- Sigehart, 978–985
- Adalbract, 985–993
- Notker, 993–1010
- Burkard I, 1010–1026
- Birthilo, 1026–1040
- Richardus, 1040–1060
- Gerungus, 1060–1084
- Cuno von Petershausen 1084–1098
- Wolven II, 1098–1105
- Otto, 1105–1124
- Dietmar, 1125–1140
- Otmar, 1140–1157
- Diethelm von Krenkingen, 1157–1161
- Heinrich I, 1161–1206
- Heinrich II, 1206–1233
- Burkart II, 1233–1241
- Hermannus, 1241–1243
- Eberhard I, 1243–1247
- Berchtold von Falkenstein, 1248–1271
- Konrad II von Herten, 1271–1302
- Heinrich III von Aitlingen, 1302–1329
- Heinrich IV von Neuenburg, 1329–1351
- Heinrich V von Aitlingen, 1351–1377
- Konrad III Mayer von Jestetten, 1380–1404
- Konrad IV von Bissingen 1404–1409
- Heinrich IV von Bettmaringen, 1409
- Hugo von Almishofen, 1409–1434
- Johannes von Kummer, 1434–1439
- Eberhard II von Schwager, 1439–1465
- Nikolaus Rüegger von Winterthur, 1466–1478
- Lorenz von Reischach, 1478–1483
- Johann Conrad von Grießen, 1483–1498
- Heinrich VII von Mandach, 1498–1529
- Bonaventura von Wellenberg, 1529–1555
- Johann Heinrich Schenk von Castell, 1555–1559
- Michael Herster von Zug, 1559–1565
- Johann Theobald Werlin von Greiffenberg, 1565–1598
- Gerold Zurlauben von Zug, 1598–1607
- Ulrich Koch von Wil, 1607–1613
- Eberhard III von Bernhausen-Kempten, 1613–1642
- Bernhard I von Freyburg-Rheinau, 1642–1682
- Basilius Iten von Unterägeri, 1682–1697
- Gerold II Zurlauben von Zug, 1697–1735
- Benedikt Ledergerber von Wil, 1735–1744
- Bernhard II Rusconi von Luzern, 1744–1753
- Romanus Effinger von Einsiedeln, 1753–1758
- Januarius I Dangel von Beromünster, 1758–1775
- Bonaventura II Lacher von Einsiedeln, 1775–1789
- Bernhard III Meyer von Schauensee, 1789–1805
- Januarius II Frey von Zurzach, 1805–1831
- Januarius III Schaller von Fribourg, 1831–1859
- Leodegar Ineichen von Urswil-Hochdorf, 1859–1862

== Gallery ==
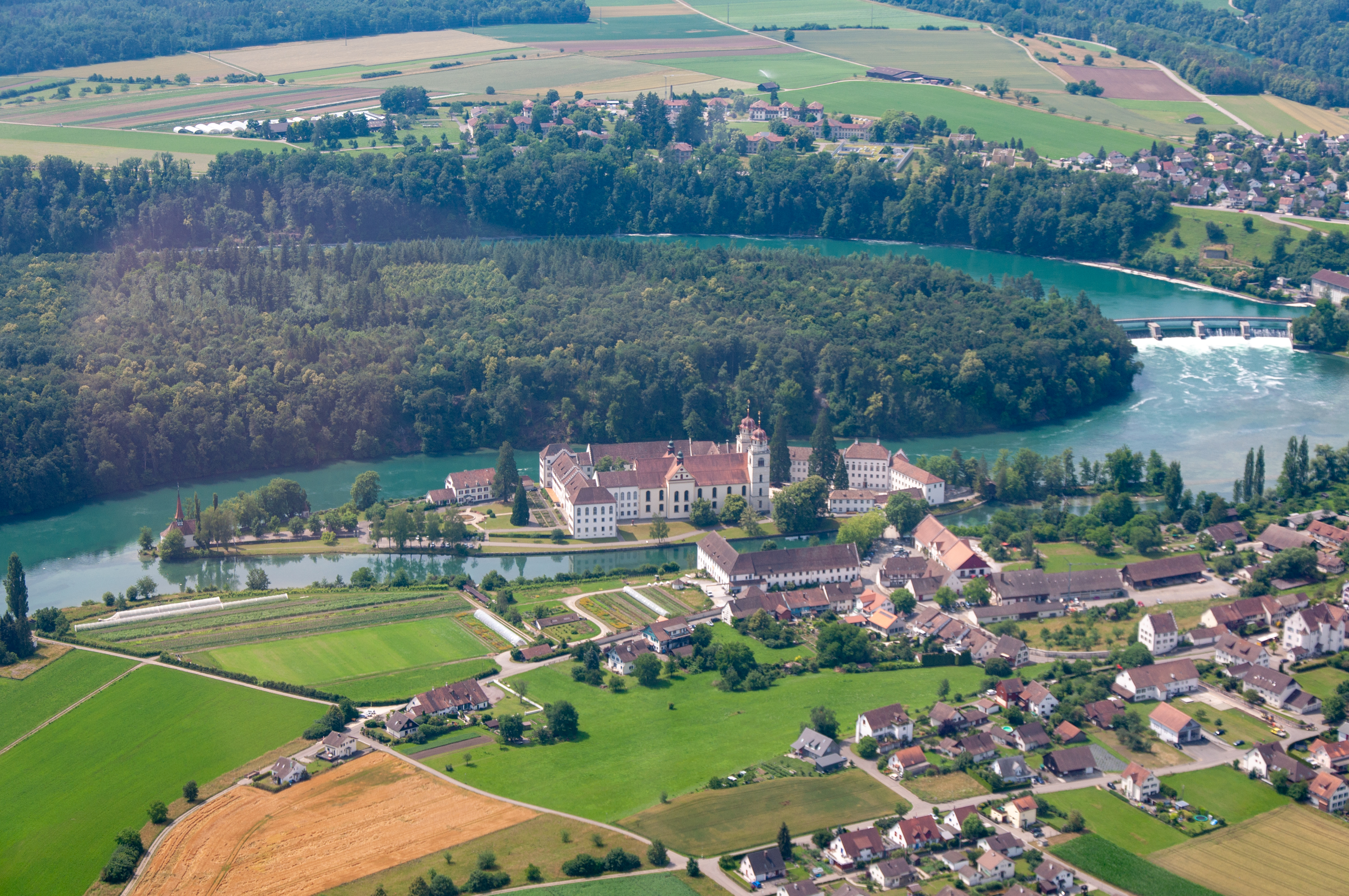
Rhine loop

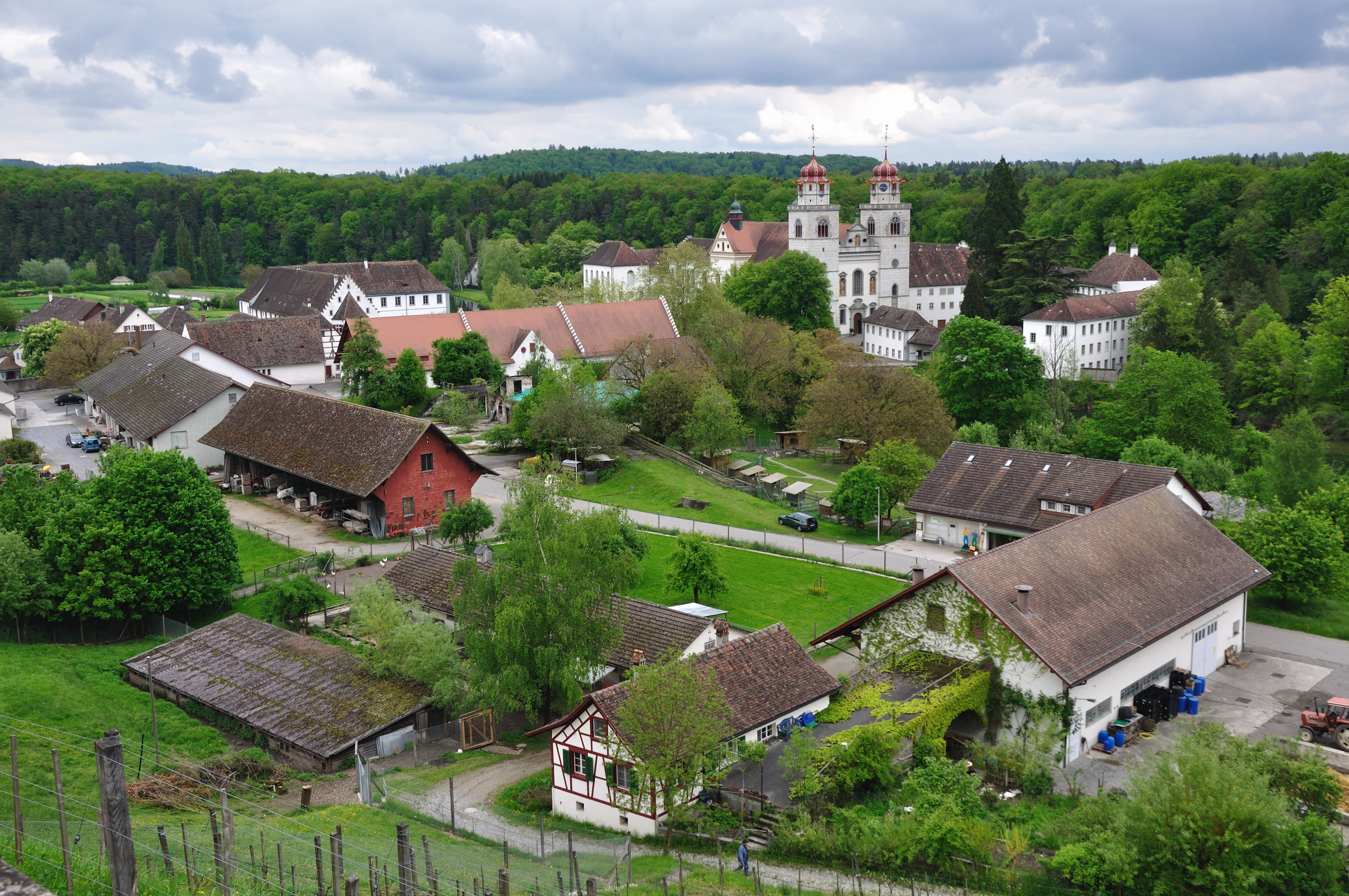
Alt-Rheinau

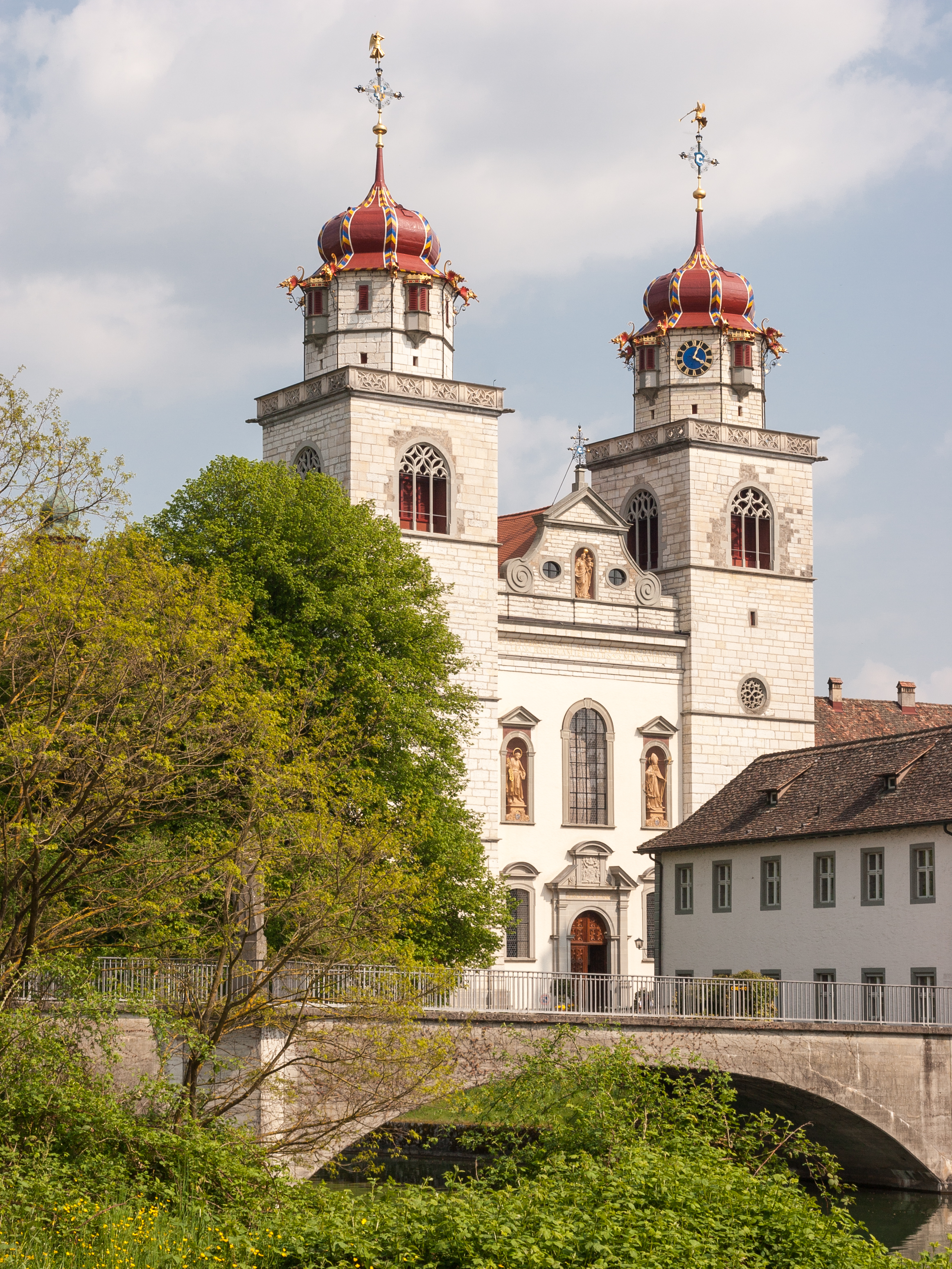
Abbey Church

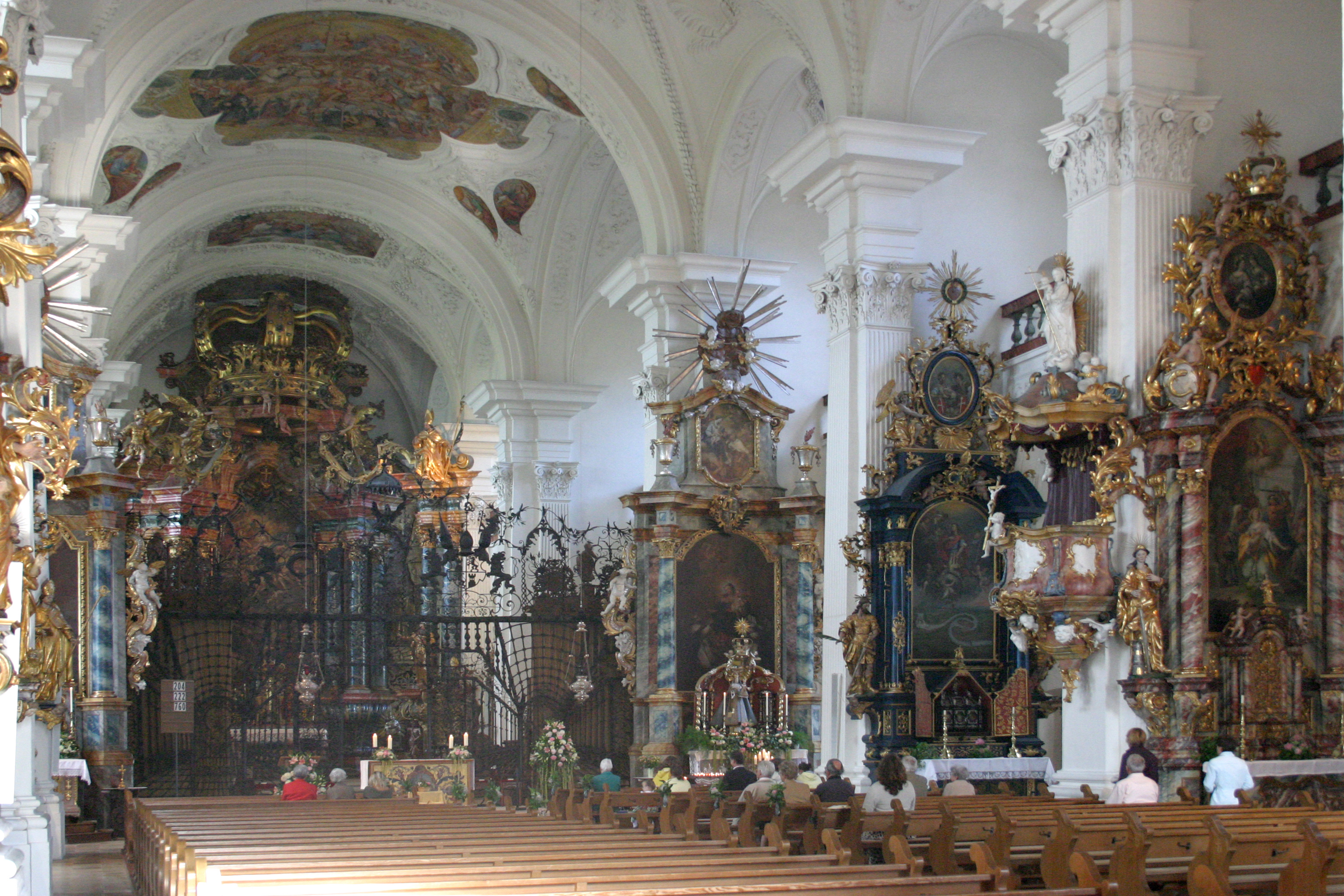

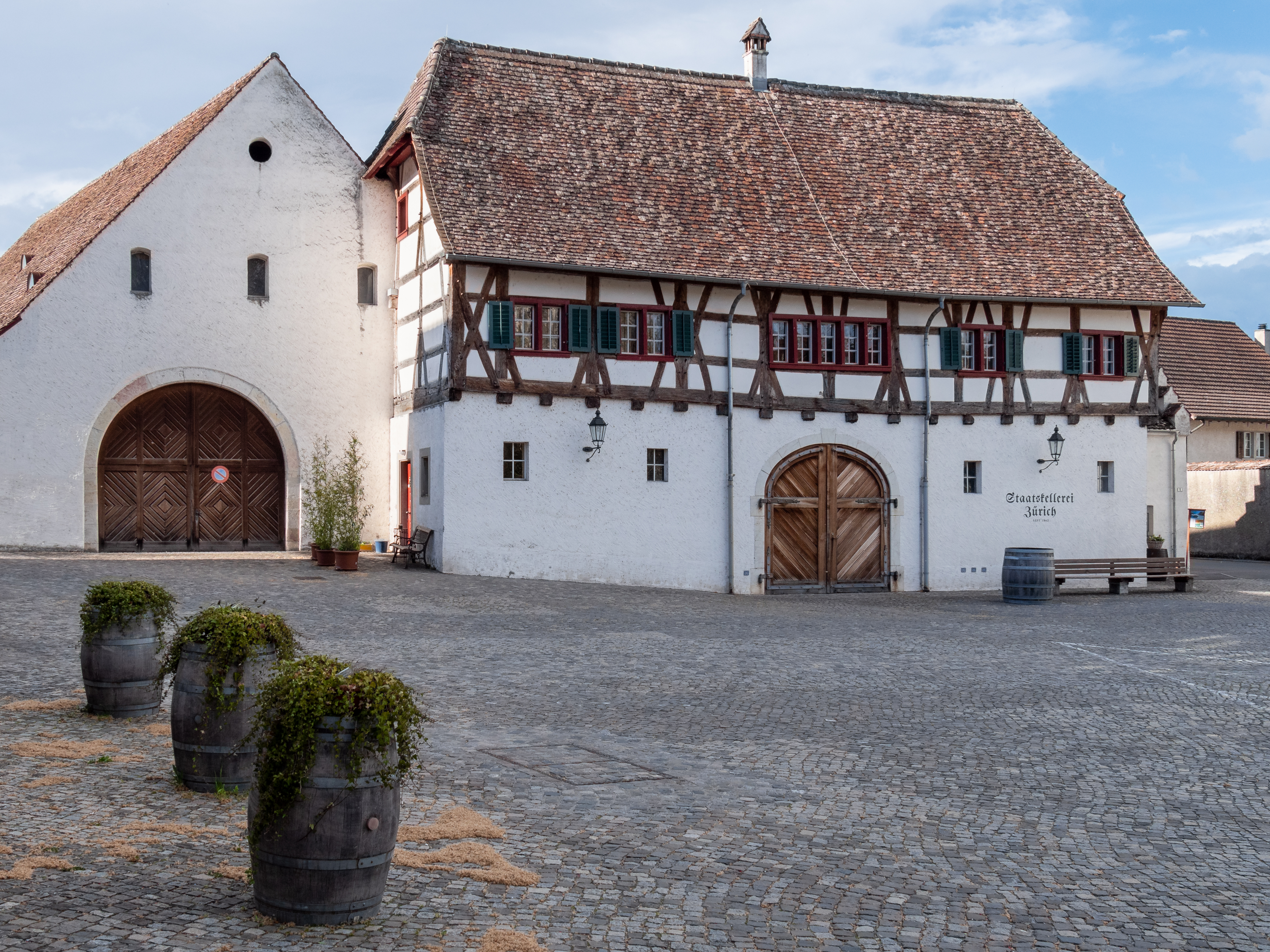
Staatskellerei Zürich
