= Fintan of Rheinau =

Irish Catholic hermit and saint

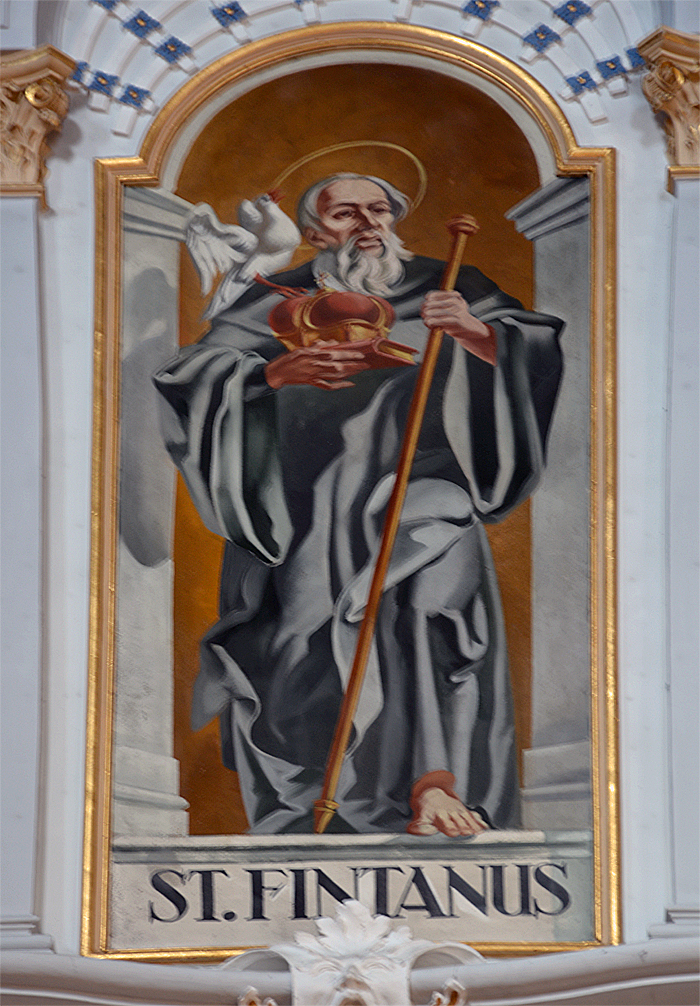
St. Fintan of Rheinau, painting from the Monastery Mariastein

Fintan of Rheinau (Findan, Findanus) (803/4 in Leinster, Ireland – 15 November 878 in Rheinau, Switzerland) was an Irish Catholic hermit who settled in Rheinau. In the Catholic Church he is venerated as a saint.

== Life ==
Fintan was born in Leinster, Ireland into a noble family. He lost his parents and siblings in internal wars in Ireland and through abductions by the Vikings. He himself was enslaved by the Vikings (possibly handed over by his Irish enemies) and taken to the Orkney Islands, but was able to escape to Scotland. There he stayed with a bishop for two years, and became a clergyman. In 845 he made a pilgrimage through the Frankish Empire to Rome. From there he went to the monastery of Farfa where he lived as a monk for some time, then via Rhaetia to Swabia, or to the landgraviate of Klettgau, where he entered the service of the Alemannic nobleman Wolvene. Wolvene persuaded him after a few years to join his monastery in Rheinau as a monk, which he did in 851. From the year 856 he lived there walled in as a recluse until his death. His bones are kept in the Rheinau monastery church in the reliquary in the Fintan altar. Shortly after his death, the Vita Findani was written by a confrere of the monastery; it is considered reliable. His attributes in church art are a dove, a ducal hat, and the monks' habit.

His biography, the Vita Findani, is considered to be a relatively accurate description of the Viking Age slave trade. Interwoven with the story of Melkorka from the Icelandic Laxdoela-Saga, it has been the basis of the Austrian-German-French documentary "Victims of the Vikings" (ORF/ZDF/Arte 2021).

== Literature ==
- Fintan Birchler: Der Heilige Fintan: ein Muster der Christlichen Vollkommenheit, 1793, 643 S. Google Books
- Harald Derschka: Das Leben des heiligen Findan von Rheinau nach der St. Galler Vita Findani aus der Handschrift 317 der Vadianischen Sammlung, Kantonsbibliothek (Vadiana). In: Rorschacher Neujahrsblatt 84 (1994), S. 77–86 (Digitalisat).
- Georg Gresser: Artikel "Findan", in: Lexikon für Theologie und Kirche (LThK) Band 3, Spalte 1293, Freiburg 1995.
- Ekkart Sauser (2000). "FINDAN (Fintan): hl. Eremit". In Bautz, Traugott (ed.). Biographisch-Bibliographisches Kirchenlexikon (BBKL) (in German). Vol. 17. Herzberg: Bautz. col. 382. ISBN 3-88309-080-8.
- Beatrix Zureich: Der heilige Fintan von Rheinau Sein Leben und seine Spiritualität. Miriam, Jestetten 2003. ISBN 978-3-87449-326-0.
- Reidar Th. Christiansen, "The People of the North", Lochlann: A Review of Celtic Studies 2/Norsk tidsskrift for sprogvidenskap, supplementary volume 6 (1962), 137–164. This reprints the early part of the Life of Fintan from Monumenta Germaniae Historica, Scriptores 15.1 (Hannover: Hahn, 1883), pp. 502–506, and includes a translation into English by Kevin Ó Nolan (pp. 155–164).
