= La Scheulte =

La Scheulte may refer to

- The municipality of Schelten in the canton of Bern, Switzerland.
- Scheulte (river) in the canton of Bern.
- The Schelten Pass in the Jura Mountains.
