= Holderbank =

Holderbank may refer to:

Two municipalities of Switzerland:

- Holderbank, Aargau
- Holderbank, Solothurn

The former name of the cement manufacturer Holcim
