= Schelten Pass =

Mountain pass in the Jura Mountains, Switzerland

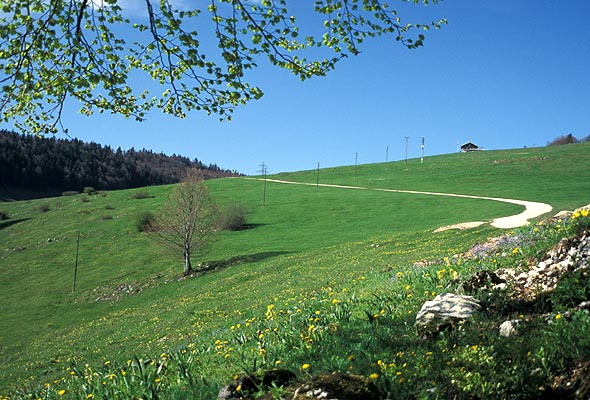
- Schelten Pass

- Location within Alps
- Elevation: 1,051 metres (3,448 ft)
- Traversed by: Road

Third Approach
- Location: Switzerland
- Range: Jura Mountains
- Coordinates: 47°20′2.8″N 07°32′0.1″E

Schelten Pass (French: La Scheulte) (el. 1051 m.) is a high mountain pass in the Jura Mountains between the cantons of Jura and Solothurn in Switzerland.

It connects Mervelier and Ramiswil and is the most direct route from Delémont and Balsthal. The pass road has a maximum grade of 12 percent.

Bunkers and fortifications built by the Swiss Army during World War II are still visible on the pass.

Hiking paths lead from the pass to Hohe Winde, Passwang, and Delémont.

== See also ==
- List of highest paved roads in Europe
- List of mountain passes
- List of the highest Swiss passes
