= Holderbank, Solothurn =

Holderbank
- Municipality
- Coat of arms
- Location of Holderbank
- Location within Switzerland Location within Canton of Solothurn
- Coordinates: 47°20′N 7°45′E
- Country: Switzerland
- Canton: Solothurn
- District: Thal

Area
  - Total: 7.76 km^{2} (3.00 sq mi)
- Elevation: 465 m (1,526 ft)

Population (December 2020)
  - Total: 705
  - Density: 90.9/km^{2} (235/sq mi)
- Time zone: UTC+01:00 (CET)
  - Summer (DST): UTC+02:00 (CEST)
- Postal code: 4718
- SFOS number: 2425
- ISO 3166 code: CH-SO
- Surrounded by: Balsthal, Egerkingen, Langenbruck (BL), Mümliswil-Ramiswil, Oberbuchsiten
- Website: www.holderbank-so.ch

Holderbank is a municipality in the district of Thal in the canton of Solothurn in Switzerland.

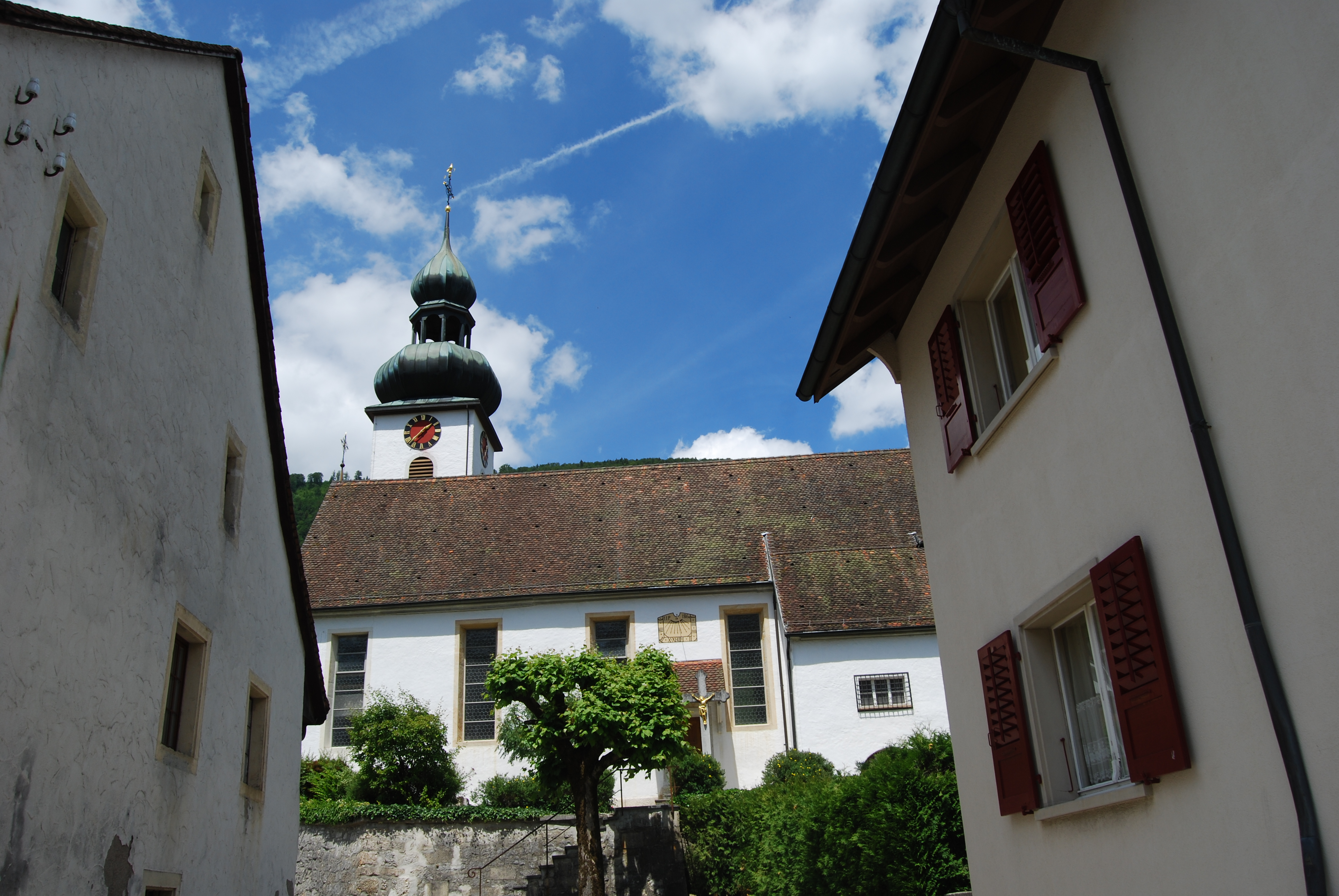
Holderbank

== History ==
Holderbank is first mentioned in 1226 as in villa Halderwane.

== Geography ==
Holderbank has an area, as of 2009, of 7.76 square kilometers (3.00 sq mi). Of this area, 3.44 km^{2} (1.33 sq mi) or 44.3% is used for agricultural purposes, while 3.84 km^{2} (1.48 sq mi) or 49.5% is forested. Of the rest of the land, 0.48 km^{2} (0.19 sq mi) or 6.2% is settled (buildings or roads), 0.03 km^{2} (7.4 acres) or 0.4% is either rivers or lakes.

Of the built up area, housing and buildings made up 3.2% and transportation infrastructure made up 2.6%. Out of the forested land, 47.0% of the total land area is heavily forested and 2.4% is covered with orchards or small clusters of trees. Of the agricultural land, 3.2% is used for growing crops and 29.8% is pastures and 10.7% is used for alpine pastures. All the water in the municipality is flowing water.

The municipality is located in the Thal district, in a longitudinal valley between the first and second Jura mountain chains near the Oberer Hauenstein Pass. It consists of the linear village of Holderbank.

== Coat of arms ==
The blazon of the municipal coat of arms is Tierced in bend Gules Argent and Sable, in the second a Letter H of the first.

== Demographics ==
Holderbank has a population (as of December 2020) of 705. As of 2008, 9.2% of the population are resident foreign nationals. Over the last 10 years (1999–2009 ) the population has changed at a rate of 3.4%.

Most of the population (as of 2000) speaks German (561 or 95.2%), with Serbo-Croatian being second most common (13 or 2.2%) and English being third (7 or 1.2%). There are 3 people who speak French.

As of 2008, the gender distribution of the population was 51.2% male and 48.8% female. The population was made up of 290 Swiss men (44.5% of the population) and 44 (6.7%) non-Swiss men. There were 280 Swiss women (42.9%) and 38 (5.8%) non-Swiss women. Of the population in the municipality 230 or about 39.0% were born in Holderbank and lived there in 2000. There were 106 or 18.0% who were born in the same canton, while 177 or 30.1% were born somewhere else in Switzerland, and 66 or 11.2% were born outside of Switzerland.

In 2008 there were 2 live births to Swiss citizens and were 6 deaths of Swiss citizens and 1 non-Swiss citizen death. Ignoring immigration and emigration, the population of Swiss citizens decreased by 4 while the foreign population decreased by 1. There were 2 Swiss men and 1 Swiss woman who immigrated back to Switzerland. At the same time, there were 6 non-Swiss men and 3 non-Swiss women who immigrated from another country to Switzerland. The total Swiss population change in 2008 (from all sources, including moves across municipal borders) was a decrease of 22 and the non-Swiss population increased by 8 people. This represents a population growth rate of -2.1%.

The age distribution, as of 2000, in Holderbank is; 43 children or 7.3% of the population are between 0 and 6 years old and 100 teenagers or 17.0% are between 7 and 19. Of the adult population, 23 people or 3.9% of the population are between 20 and 24 years old. 175 people or 29.7% are between 25 and 44, and 150 people or 25.5% are between 45 and 64. The senior population distribution is 71 people or 12.1% of the population are between 65 and 79 years old and there are 27 people or 4.6% who are over 80.

As of 2000, there were 214 people who were single and never married in the municipality. There were 300 married individuals, 35 widows or widowers and 40 individuals who are divorced.

As of 2000, there were 260 private households in the municipality, and an average of 2.3 persons per household. There were 89 households that consist of only one person and 19 households with five or more people. Out of a total of 263 households that answered this question, 33.8% were households made up of just one person and there were 3 adults who lived with their parents. Of the rest of the households, there are 81 married couples without children, 66 married couples with children. There were 14 single parents with a child or children. There were 7 households that were made up of unrelated people and 3 households that were made up of some sort of institution or another collective housing.

In 2000 there were 141 single family homes (or 66.2% of the total) out of a total of 213 inhabited buildings. There were 28 multi-family buildings (13.1%), along with 26 multi-purpose buildings that were mostly used for housing (12.2%) and 18 other use buildings (commercial or industrial) that also had some housing (8.5%). Of the single family homes 20 were built before 1919, while 11 were built between 1990 and 2000. The greatest number of single family homes (35) were built between 1946 and 1960.

In 2000 there were 296 apartments in the municipality. The most common apartment size was 5 rooms of which there were 75. There were 6 single room apartments and 134 apartments with five or more rooms. Of these apartments, a total of 245 apartments (82.8% of the total) were permanently occupied, while 28 apartments (9.5%) were seasonally occupied and 23 apartments (7.8%) were empty. As of 2009, the construction rate of new housing units was 0 new units per 1000 residents. The vacancy rate for the municipality, in 2010, was 1.95%.

The historical population is given in the following chart:

== Heritage sites of national significance ==
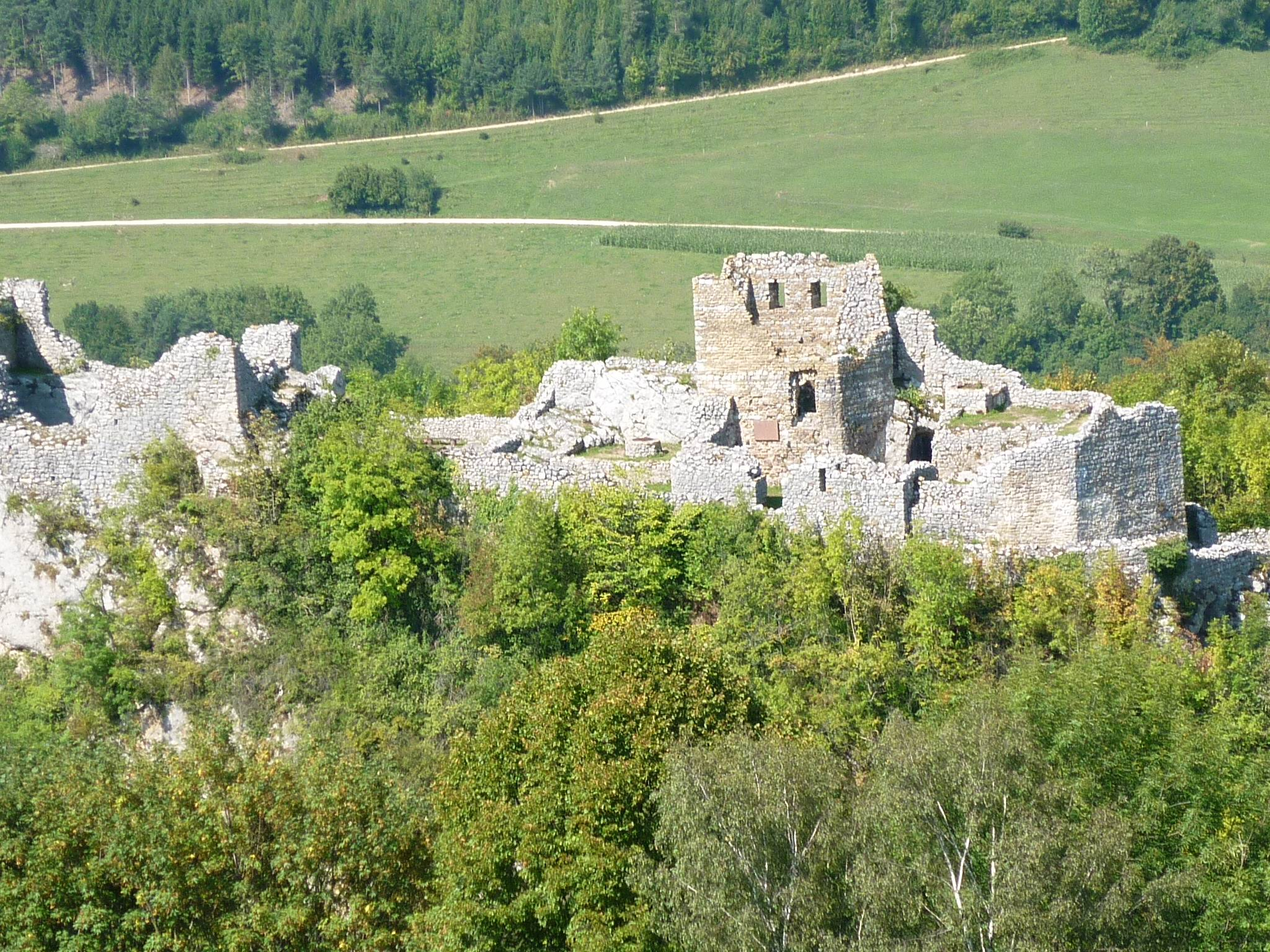
Ruins of Alt-Bechburg

The Ruin of Alt-Bechburg Castle is listed as a Swiss heritage site of national significance.

== Politics ==
In the 2007 federal election the most popular party was the CVP which received 32.88% of the vote. The next three most popular parties were the SVP (30.9%), the FDP (20.45%) and the Green Party (7.12%). In the federal election, a total of 260 votes were cast, and the voter turnout was 53.5%.

== Economy ==
As of 2010, Holderbank had an unemployment rate of 2.7%. As of 2008, there were 35 people employed in the primary economic sector and about 13 businesses involved in this sector. 109 people were employed in the secondary sector and there were 9 businesses in this sector. 65 people were employed in the tertiary sector, with 17 businesses in this sector. There were 305 residents of the municipality who were employed in some capacity, of which females made up 41.3% of the workforce.

In 2008 the total number of full-time equivalent jobs was 173. The number of jobs in the primary sector was 25, of which 23 were in agriculture and 2 were in forestry or lumber production. The number of jobs in the secondary sector was 102 of which 92 or (90.2%) were in manufacturing and 8 (7.8%) were in construction. The number of jobs in the tertiary sector was 46. In the tertiary sector; 5 or 10.9% were in wholesale or retail sales or the repair of motor vehicles, 3 or 6.5% were in the movement and storage of goods, 29 or 63.0% were in a hotel or restaurant, 1 was the insurance or financial industry, 1 was a technical professional or scientist, 5 or 10.9% were in education.

In 2000, there were 88 workers who commuted into the municipality and 207 workers who commuted away. The municipality is a net exporter of workers, with about 2.4 workers leaving the municipality for every one entering. Of the working population, 10.2% used public transportation to get to work, and 63% used a private car.

== Religion ==
From the 2000 census, 318 or 54.0% were Roman Catholic, while 162 or 27.5% belonged to the Swiss Reformed Church. Of the rest of the population, there were 19 members of an Orthodox church (or about 3.23% of the population), there were 2 individuals (or about 0.34% of the population) who belonged to the Christian Catholic Church, and there were 5 individuals (or about 0.85% of the population) who belonged to another Christian church. There were 13 (or about 2.21% of the population) who were Islamic. There was 1 individual who belonged to another church. 60 (or about 10.19% of the population) belonged to no church, are agnostic or atheist, and 9 individuals (or about 1.53% of the population) did not answer the question.

== Education ==
In Holderbank about 223 or (37.9%) of the population have completed non-mandatory upper secondary education, and 48 or (8.1%) have completed additional higher education (either university or a Fachhochschule). Of the 48 who completed tertiary schooling, 75.0% were Swiss men, 10.4% were Swiss women and 10.4% were non-Swiss women.

As of 2000, there were 54 students in Holderbank who came from another municipality, while 37 residents attended schools outside the municipality.
