= Alt-Bechburg Castle =

Castle in Holderbank, Switzerland

- Holderbank
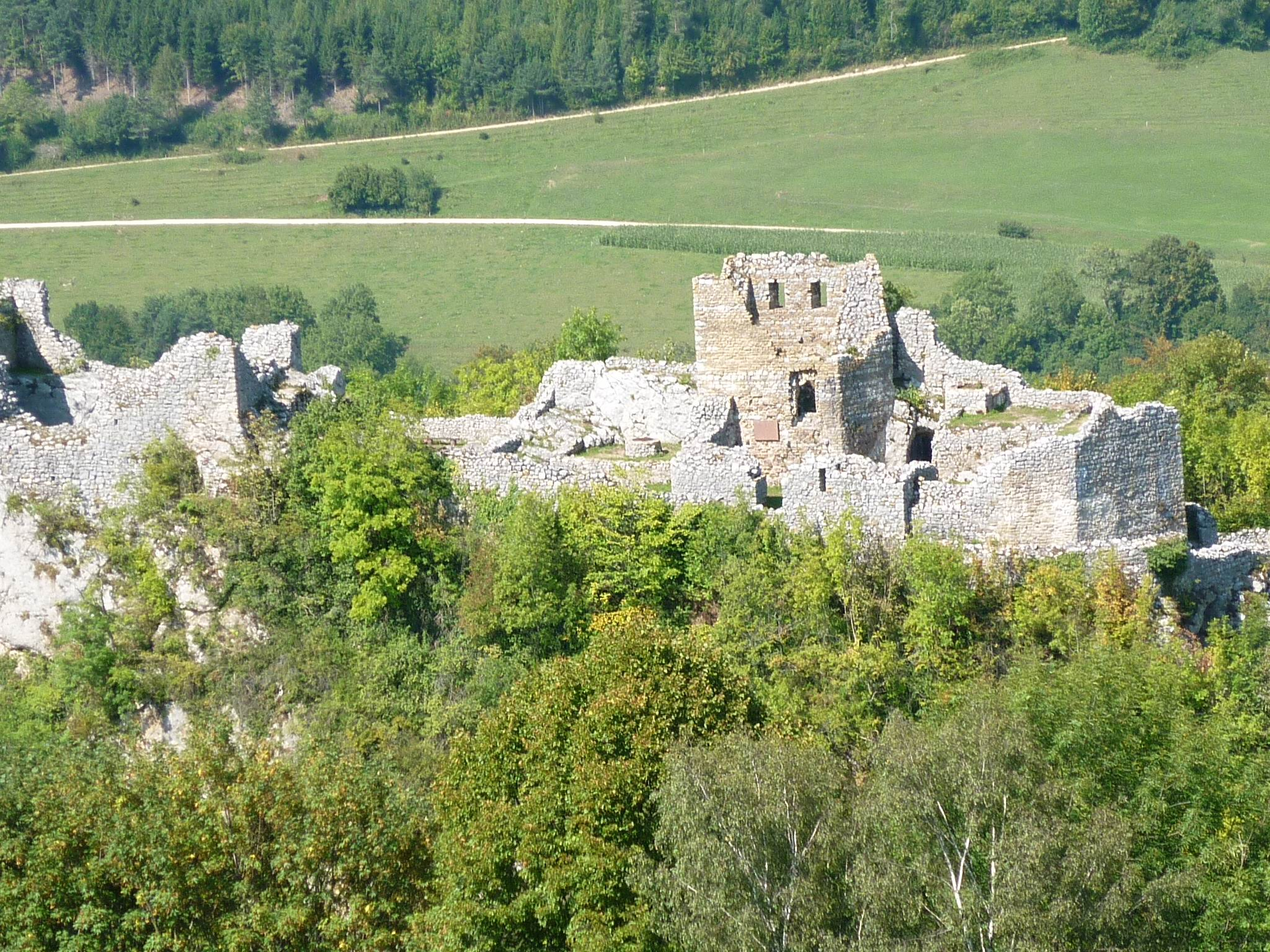
- Ruins of Alt-Bechburg

Site information
- Type: hill castle
- Code: CH-SO
- Condition: ruin

Location
- Coordinates: 47°19′56″N 7°46′18″E

Site history
- Built: c. 1000-1100

Garrison information
- Occupants: counts

Alt-Bechburg Castle is a castle in the municipality of Holderbank of the Canton of Solothurn in Switzerland. It is a Swiss heritage site of national significance.

== See also ==
- List of castles in Switzerland
