= Mümliswil-Ramiswil =

- Municipality
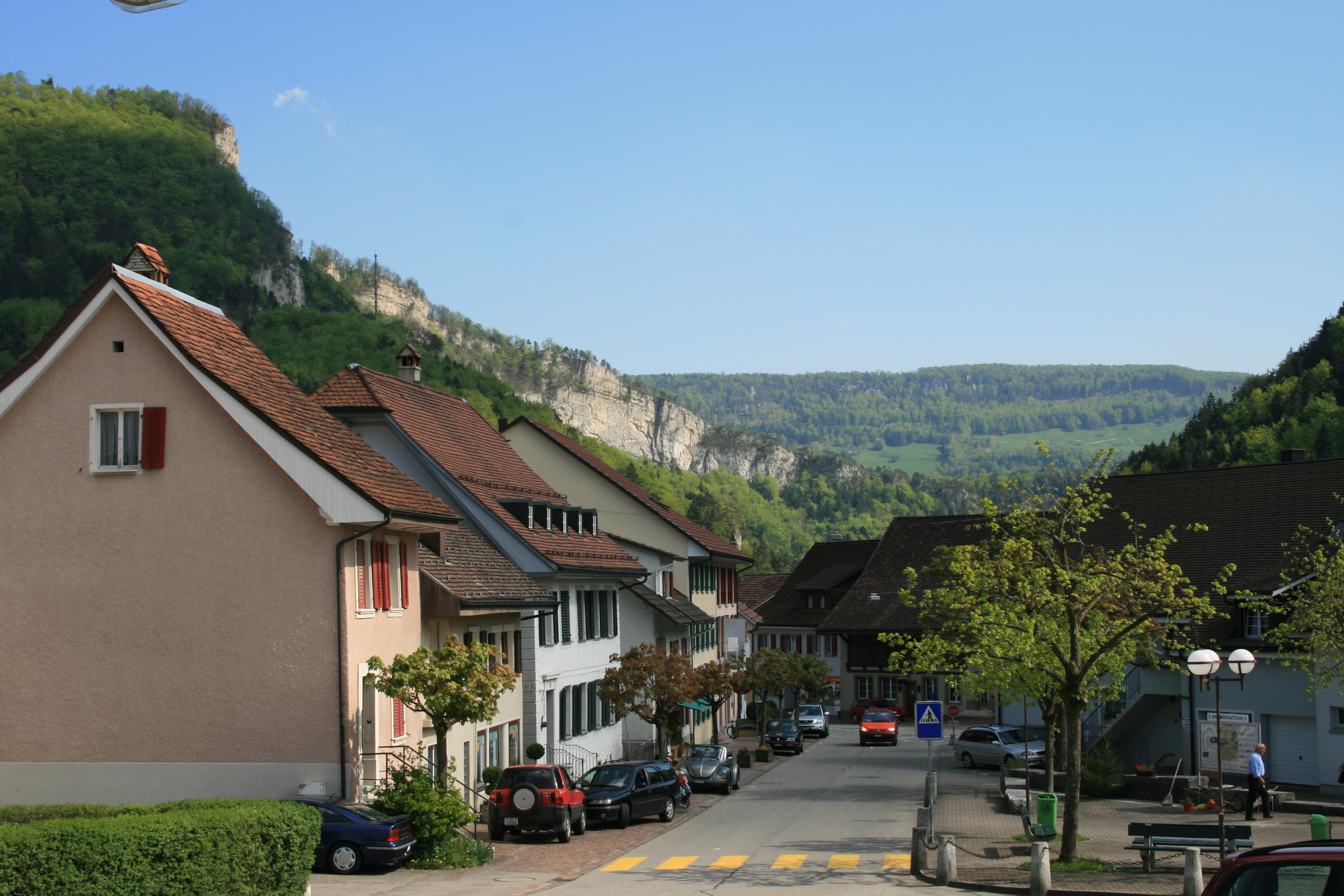
- Mümliswil village

- Coat of arms
- Location of Mümliswil-Ramiswil
- Location within Switzerland Location within Canton of Solothurn
- Coordinates: 47°20′N 7°42′E
- Country: Switzerland
- Canton: Solothurn
- District: Thal

Area
  - Total: 35.53 km^{2} (13.72 sq mi)
- Elevation: 556 m (1,824 ft)

Population (December 2020)
  - Total: 2,386
  - Density: 67.15/km^{2} (173.9/sq mi)
- Time zone: UTC+01:00 (CET)
  - Summer (DST): UTC+02:00 (CEST)
- Postal codes: 4717 Mümliswil, 4719 Ramiswil
- SFOS number: 2428
- ISO 3166 code: CH-SO
- Surrounded by: Aedermannsdorf, Balsthal, Beinwil, Holderbank, Langenbruck (BL), Laupersdorf, Lauwil (BL), Matzendorf, Reigoldswil (BL), Waldenburg (BL)
- Website: muemliswil-ramiswil.ch

Mümliswil-Ramiswil is a municipality in the district of Thal in the canton of Solothurn in Switzerland.

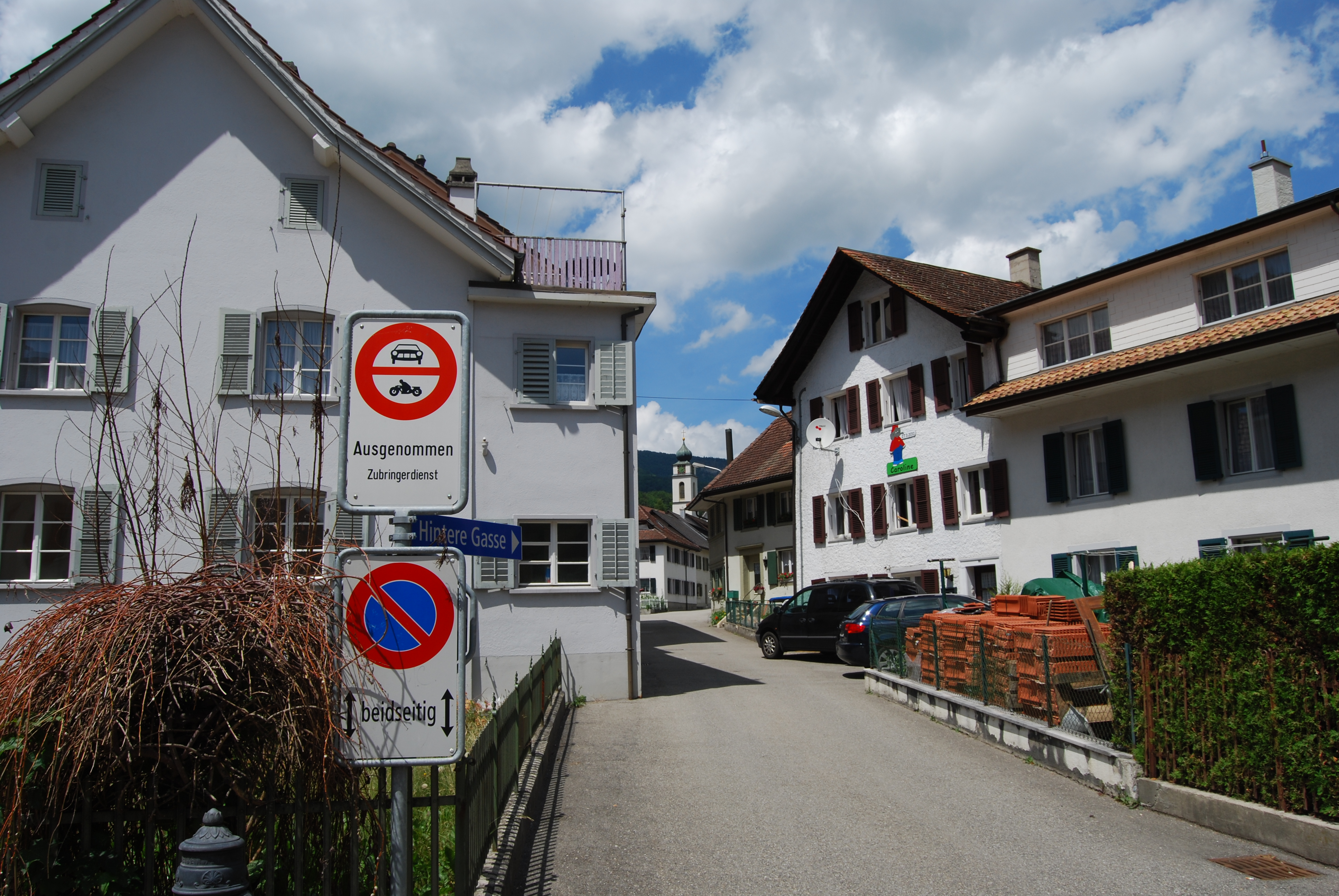
Mümliswil

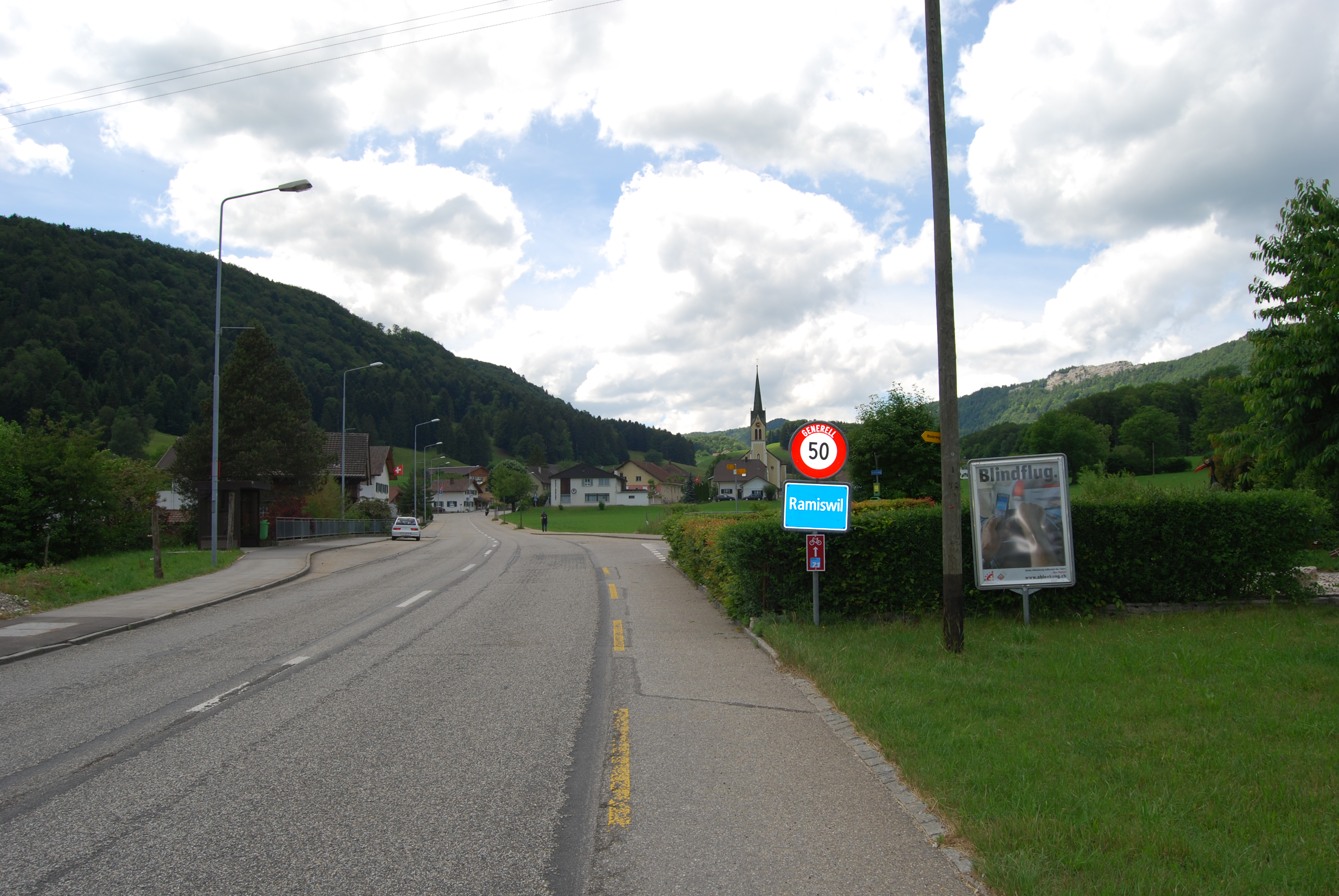
Ramiswil

== History ==
Mümliswil is first mentioned in 1145 as Mumliswilre and Mumliswilere. In 1194 it was mentioned as Mumeliswile. Ramiswil was first mentioned in 1147 as Rammolswlare, while in 1152 it was mentioned as Rammolswilare.

== Geography ==
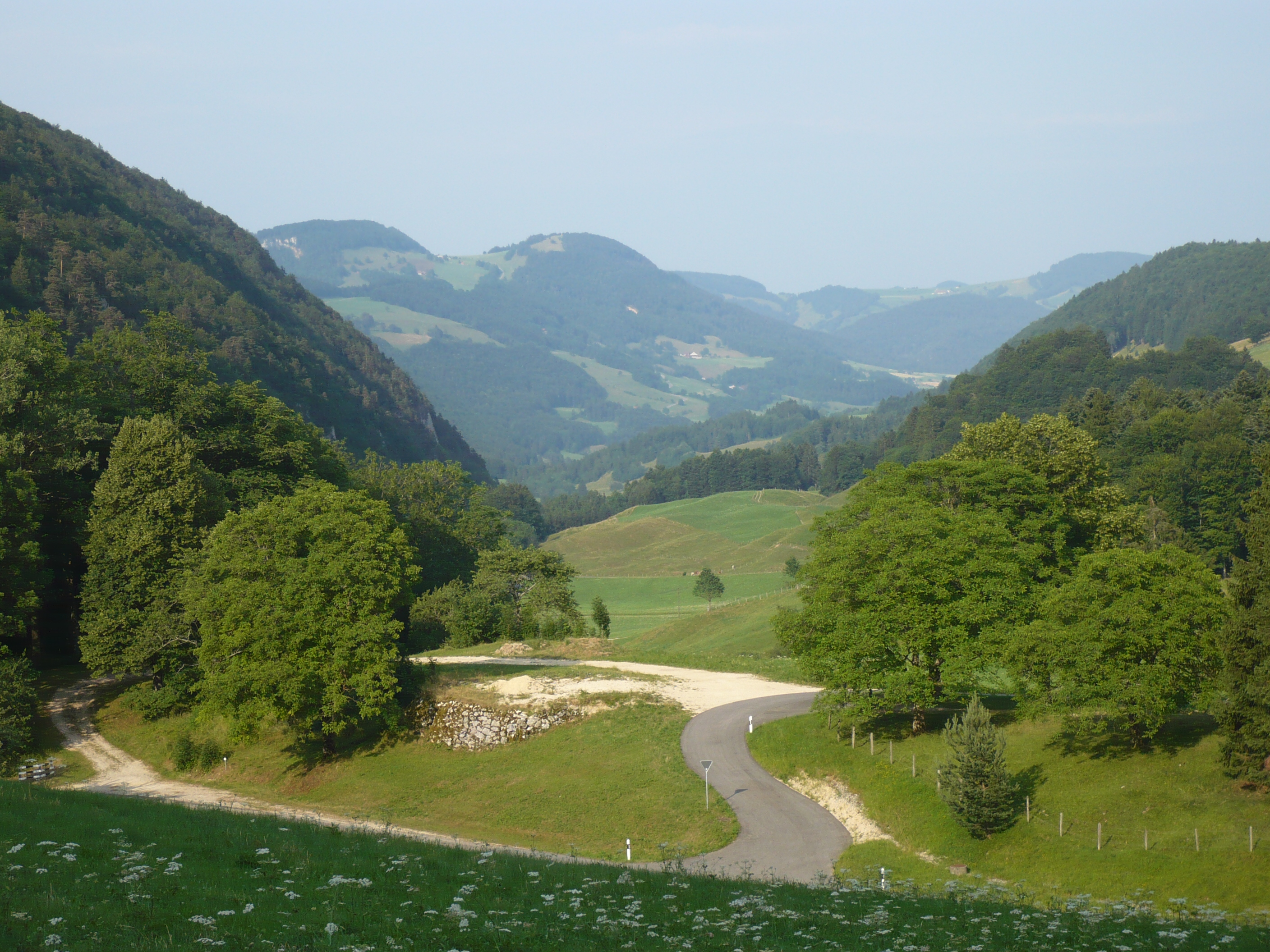
Gulden valley

Aerial view (1947)

Mümliswil-Ramiswil has an area, as of 2009, of 35.53 square kilometers (13.72 sq mi). Of this area, 17.89 km^{2} (6.91 sq mi) or 50.4% is used for agricultural purposes, while 16.03 km^{2} (6.19 sq mi) or 45.1% is forested. Of the rest of the land, 1.47 km^{2} (0.57 sq mi) or 4.1% is settled (buildings or roads), 0.04 km^{2} (9.9 acres) or 0.1% is either rivers or lakes and 0.05 km^{2} (12 acres) or 0.1% is unproductive land.

Of the built up area, housing and buildings made up 2.4% and transportation infrastructure made up 1.2%. Out of the forested land, 41.9% of the total land area is heavily forested and 3.2% is covered with orchards or small clusters of trees. Of the agricultural land, 2.9% is used for growing crops and 27.5% is pastures and 19.6% is used for alpine pastures. All the water in the municipality is flowing water.

The municipality is located in the Thal district, in the Gulden valley between the second and third Jura mountain chains. It sits on the route over the Passwang Pass, the Wasserfallen crossing and the Schelten Pass. The municipality covers the entire Gulden valley, as well as the Lobisei canyon, which connects to the Balsthal valley. It is the largest municipality, in terms of area, in the Canton of Solothurn. It consists of the villages of Mümliswil and Ramiswil as well a number of hamlets and individual farm houses.

== Coat of arms ==
The blazon of the municipal coat of arms is Per pale Or a Crozier with letter M in the top Sable and tierced per fess Sable Argent and Gules.

== Demographics ==
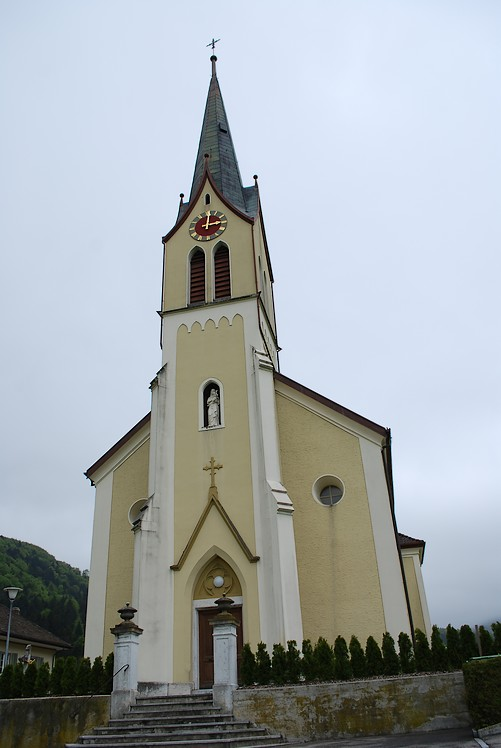
Church in Ramiswil

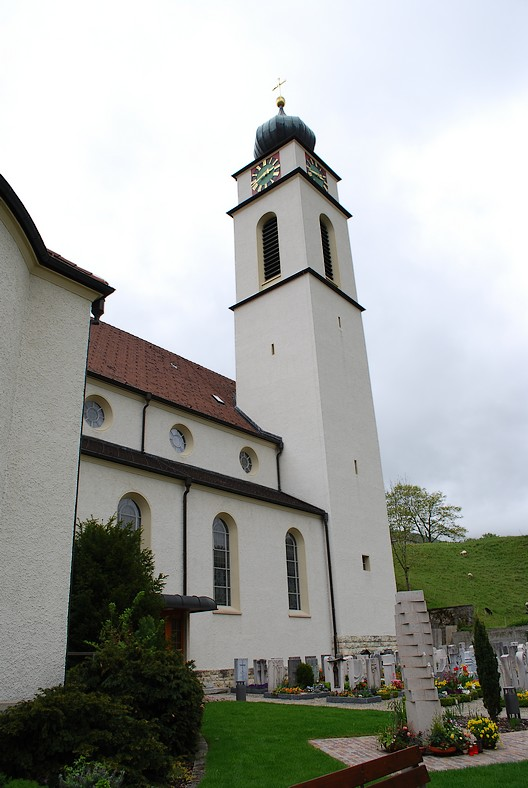
Church in Mümliswil

Mümliswil-Ramiswil has a population (as of December 2020) of 2,386. As of 2008, 8.5% of the population are resident foreign nationals. Over the last 10 years (1999–2009) the population has changed at a rate of -2.9%. Over the same time period the population has changed at a rate of -2% due to migration and at a rate of -1.1% due to births and deaths.

Most of the population (as of 2000) speaks German (2,387 or 93.5%), with Serbo-Croatian being second most common (70 or 2.7%) and Albanian being third (35 or 1.4%). There are 7 people who speak French and 1 person who speaks Romansh.

As of 2008, the gender distribution of the population was 51.9% male and 48.1% female. The population was made up of 1,188 Swiss men (46.8% of the population) and 129 (5.1%) non-Swiss men. There were 1,113 Swiss women (43.9%) and 107 (4.2%) non-Swiss women. Of the population in the municipality 1,590 or about 62.3% were born in Mümliswil-Ramiswil and lived there in 2000. There were 379 or 14.8% who were born in the same canton, while 268 or 10.5% were born somewhere else in Switzerland, and 233 or 9.1% were born outside of Switzerland.

In 2008 there were 18 live births to Swiss citizens and 1 birth to non-Swiss citizens, and in same time span there were 19 deaths of Swiss citizens. Ignoring immigration and emigration, the population of Swiss citizens decreased by 1 while the foreign population increased by 1. There were 3 Swiss women who immigrated back to Switzerland. At the same time, there were 7 non-Swiss men and 6 non-Swiss women who immigrated from another country to Switzerland. The total Swiss population change in 2008 (from all sources, including moves across municipal borders) was a decrease of 10 and the non-Swiss population increased by 12 people. This represents a population growth rate of 0.1%.

The age distribution, as of 2000, in Mümliswil-Ramiswil is; 237 children or 9.3% of the population are between 0 and 6 years old and 473 teenagers or 18.5% are between 7 and 19. Of the adult population, 133 people or 5.2% of the population are between 20 and 24 years old. 759 people or 29.7% are between 25 and 44, and 535 people or 21.0% are between 45 and 64. The senior population distribution is 312 people or 12.2% of the population are between 65 and 79 years old and there are 104 people or 4.1% who are over 80.

As of 2000, there were 1,081 people who were single and never married in the municipality. There were 1,244 married individuals, 155 widows or widowers and 73 individuals who are divorced.

As of 2000, there were 962 private households in the municipality, and an average of 2.6 persons per household. There were 265 households that consist of only one person and 120 households with five or more people. Out of a total of 971 households that answered this question, 27.3% were households made up of just one person and there were 9 adults who lived with their parents. Of the rest of the households, there are 243 married couples without children, 392 married couples with children There were 38 single parents with a child or children. There were 15 households that were made up of unrelated people and 9 households that were made up of some sort of institution or another collective housing.

In 2000 there were 449 single family homes (or 63.1% of the total) out of a total of 712 inhabited buildings. There were 109 multi-family buildings (15.3%), along with 112 multi-purpose buildings that were mostly used for housing (15.7%) and 42 other use buildings (commercial or industrial) that also had some housing (5.9%). Of the single family homes 36 were built before 1919, while 59 were built between 1990 and 2000. The greatest number of single family homes (95) were built between 1946 and 1960.

In 2000 there were 1,003 apartments in the municipality. The most common apartment size was 5 rooms of which there were 265. There were 26 single room apartments and 460 apartments with five or more rooms. Of these apartments, a total of 902 apartments (89.9% of the total) were permanently occupied, while 72 apartments (7.2%) were seasonally occupied and 29 apartments (2.9%) were empty. As of 2009, the construction rate of new housing units was 1.2 new units per 1000 residents. The vacancy rate for the municipality, in 2010, was 4.09%.

The historical population is given in the following chart:

== Politics ==
In the 2007 federal election the most popular party was the CVP which received 41.84% of the vote. The next three most popular parties were the SVP (36.25%), the FDP (11.86%) and the SP (7.11%). In the federal election, a total of 1,192 votes were cast, and the voter turnout was 64.2%.

== Economy ==
As of 2010, Mümliswil-Ramiswil had an unemployment rate of 1.9%. As of 2008, there were 228 people employed in the primary economic sector and about 88 businesses involved in this sector. 228 people were employed in the secondary sector and there were 33 businesses in this sector. 277 people were employed in the tertiary sector, with 57 businesses in this sector. There were 1,253 residents of the municipality who were employed in some capacity, of which females made up 38.9% of the workforce.

In 2008 the total number of full-time equivalent jobs was 578. The number of jobs in the primary sector was 159, of which 154 were in agriculture and 5 were in forestry or lumber production. The number of jobs in the secondary sector was 212 of which 72 or (34.0%) were in manufacturing and 139 (65.6%) were in construction. The number of jobs in the tertiary sector was 207. In the tertiary sector; 82 or 39.6% were in wholesale or retail sales or the repair of motor vehicles, 12 or 5.8% were in the movement and storage of goods, 40 or 19.3% were in a hotel or restaurant, 2 or 1.0% were in the information industry, 9 or 4.3% were the insurance or financial industry, 9 or 4.3% were technical professionals or scientists, 35 or 16.9% were in education and 2 or 1.0% were in health care.

In 2000, there were 154 workers who commuted into the municipality and 758 workers who commuted away. The municipality is a net exporter of workers, with about 4.9 workers leaving the municipality for every one entering. Of the working population, 10.8% used public transportation to get to work, and 57.9% used a private car.

== Religion ==
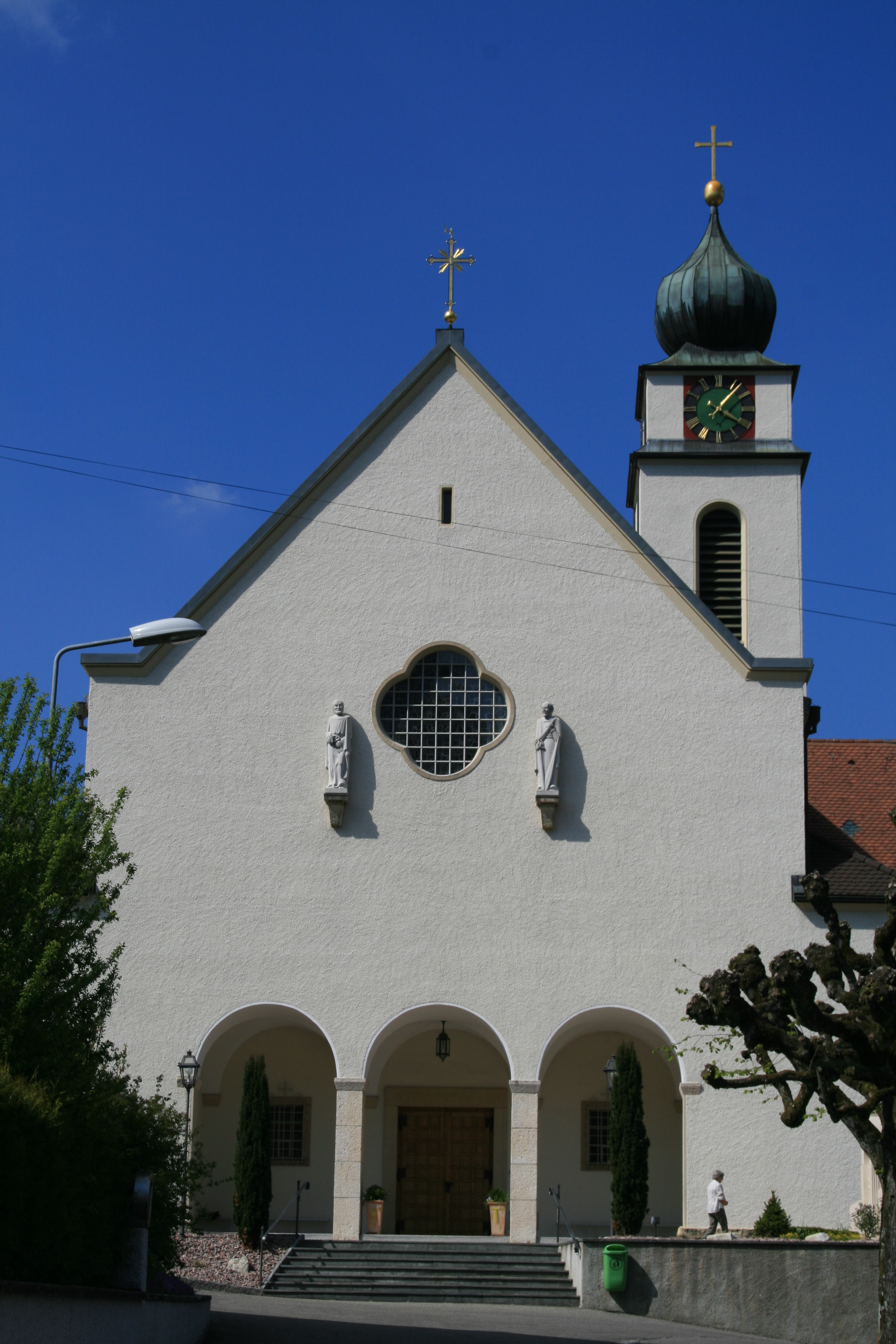
church of Mümliswil

From the 2000 census, 2,066 or 80.9% were Roman Catholic, while 209 or 8.2% belonged to the Swiss Reformed Church. Of the rest of the population, there were 41 members of an Orthodox church (or about 1.61% of the population), there were 2 individuals (or about 0.08% of the population) who belonged to the Christian Catholic Church, and there were 26 individuals (or about 1.02% of the population) who belonged to another Christian church. There were 65 (or about 2.55% of the population) who were Islamic. There were 2 individuals who were Buddhist and 3 individuals who belonged to another church. 66 (or about 2.59% of the population) belonged to no church, are agnostic or atheist, and 73 individuals (or about 2.86% of the population) did not answer the question.

== Education ==
In Mümliswil-Ramiswil about 872 or (34.2%) of the population have completed non-mandatory upper secondary education, and 142 or (5.6%) have completed additional higher education (either university or a Fachhochschule). Of the 142 who completed tertiary schooling, 78.2% were Swiss men, 15.5% were Swiss women and 3.5% were non-Swiss women.

During the 2010–2011 school year there were a total of 257 students in the Mümliswil-Ramiswil school system. The education system in the Canton of Solothurn allows young children to attend two years of non-obligatory Kindergarten. During that school year, there were 47 children in kindergarten. The canton's school system requires students to attend six years of primary school, with some of the children attending smaller, specialized classes. In the municipality there were 210 students in primary school. The secondary school program consists of three lower, obligatory years of schooling, followed by three to five years of optional, advanced schools. All the lower secondary students from Mümliswil-Ramiswil attend their school in a neighboring municipality.

As of 2000, there were 10 students in Mümliswil-Ramiswil who came from another municipality, while 118 residents attended schools outside the municipality.
