= Oskar Bider =

Swiss aviation pioneer (1891–1919)

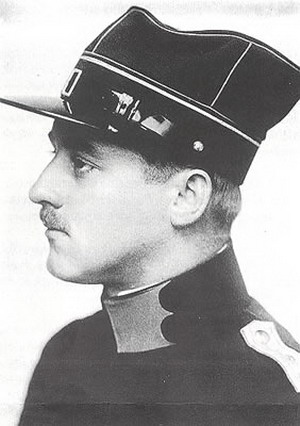
- Born: 12 July 1891; Langenbruck, Switzerland
- Died: 7 July 1919 (aged 27); Dübendorf, Switzerland
- Occupations: Pilot, farmer
- Known for: First flight over the Pyrenees, crossing of the Alps from Bern (Switzerland) to Milan (Italy) in both directions

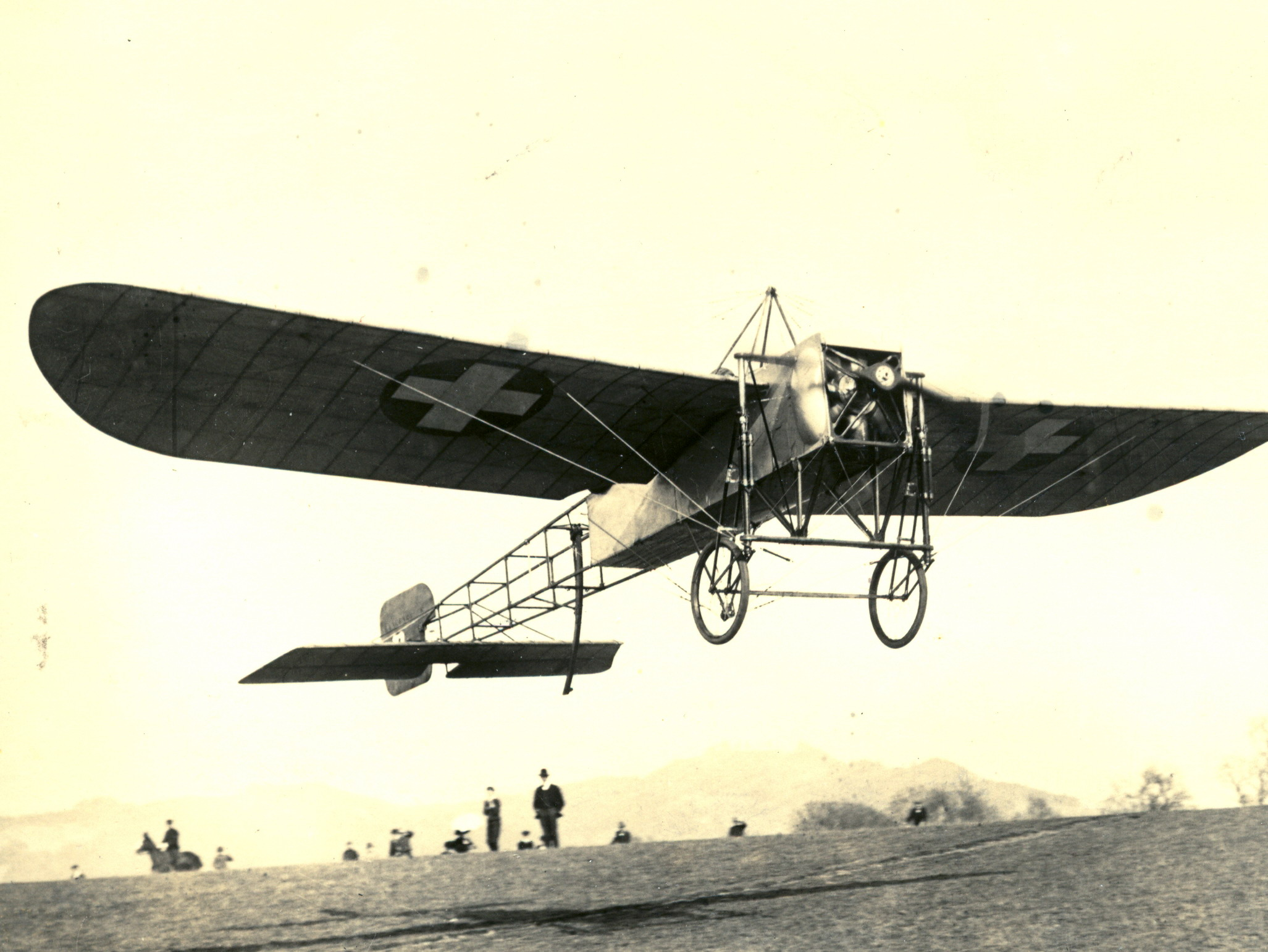
Oscar Bider starting in Bern to his flight over the Alps

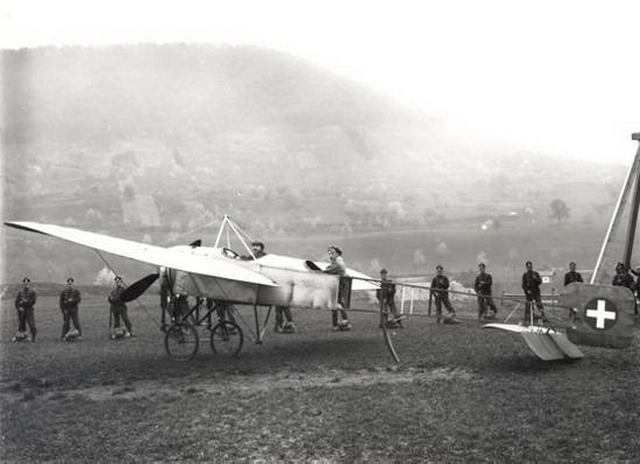
Oscar Bider in July 1913 in Liestal

Oskar Bider (12 July 1891 in Langenbruck – 7 July 1919 in Dübendorf) was a Swiss aviation pioneer.

== Early life ==
Oskar Bider grew up in Langenbruck (canton of Basel-Land) and graduated from the primary school to the district school in Waldenburg. He had no interest in his father's business as a draper and preferred to become a farmer; he attended the Agricultural School in Langenthal and then worked on several farms. Having completed the primary military service (Rekrutenschule) in Switzerland in June 1911, he decided to emigrate to Argentina and worked in 1911/12 as a gaucho on the farm of a Swiss citizen living in Romang, Santa Fe.

== Aviation pioneer ==
Driven by ambition and nostalgia, Oskar returned to Europe in 1912. On 8 November that year, he joined Blériot's aviation school in Pau, situated in the northern Pyrenees. After one month of training, he earned an international pilot's licence on 8 December 1912 with Swiss pilot's licence number 32. He later bought a Blériot XI monoplane, and on 24 January 1913 pioneered in crossing the Pyrenees from Pau to Madrid. In March 1913 he returned to Switzerland by train, welcomed at the border in Basel as a much-admired 'aviation hero'. On 9 March he flew the first airmail flight in Switzerland from Basel to Liestal. Later that year on 13 May he crossed the Alps from Bern to Sion, Switzerland for the first time.

Emile Taddéoli lost a wheel while taking off to fly from Bern to Biel/Bienne on 3 June 1913. Bider witnessed the incident and took off with the wheel to catch up with Taddéoli and warn him of the danger. Taddéoli acknowledged and landed without a problem in Biel/Bienne.

=== First Alpine flight ===
Bider's big goal was crossing the Alps from Bern to Milan which had been attempted three years earlier by fellow aviation pioneer Jorge Chávez (Pennine Alps only from Ried-Brig to Domodossola). He prepared for this ambitious flight carefully and left nothing to chance. His first attempt did not happen as planned because a prior test flight showed that his airplane, with a 70-hp engine and full fuel tanks could not reach the required altitude in the thin mountain air. He decided to stop halfway in Domodossola to refuel and finish the flight. On 13 July 1913 (the day after his 22nd birthday) he took off at 4 a.m. in Bern for Italy. The Jungfraujoch was the greatest obstacle for this flight and for over half an hour Bider struggled desperately before he finally reached the required altitude of 3,600 metres (11,800 ft) resulting in a new Swiss record. At 6:10 a.m. he passed the top of Jungfraujoch with about 100 metres (330 ft) of clearance. He stopped in Domodossola, located south of the Alps, for fuel as planned and then finished his journey in Milan. He waited 13 days in Milan for good weather conditions and then flew back this time crossing Lukmanier Pass and Chrüzli Pass. He landed in Liestal to refuel and continued on to Basel and then came back to Bern. Bider thus became the first aviator to cross the Alps entirely and the Alps in both directions (north to south and south to north).

=== Other records ===
Continuing his pioneering streak, on 1 August 1913 Bider completed the first night flight in Switzerland. On Christmas Day 1913, Bider set a new record flying from Paris to Bern in 4 hours and 20 minutes non-stop.

On 21 June 1919 Bider accomplished another great aviation performance in benefit of the civil aviation: he started with two passengers in St. Jakob, Basel, for a flight around Switzerland, landing successfully after seven and a half hours at the starting point.

== Commercial services ==
Oskar Bider and Fritz Rihner started the Schweizerische Gesellschaft für Lufttourismus (Swiss Society for air tourism) in July 1919. Tour flights—using flying boats—were planned from sites at Zürichhorn, Geneva, Interlaken/Thun, Locarno, Lugano, Lucerne, Lausanne-Ouchy, Romanshorn and St. Moritz. Unfortunately, Oskar would be killed in a plane crash before the ambitious project was realized.

== Death ==
In the early morning of 7 July 1919, Bider left the officers' mess at Dübendorf airfield. He had spent the previous few days celebrating the completion of his service in the Swiss Air Force, which had ended on 2 July. But before starting the commercial tourist flights, he wanted to put on an aerobatic display for his former military colleagues. So after a sleepless night at 6.30am he took off in a Nieuport 21 fighter for the demonstration. However, during a manoeuvre his plane entered an unrecoverable stall causing it to crash into the ground killing Bider instantly.

When news of his death reached his devoted 25-year-old sister, Julie Helene "Leny" Bider (she had moved to Zurich in 1915 to live near her famous brother), she shot herself that afternoon in her room at the Hotel Bellevue au Lac, in Zürich.

Oskar and Leny Bider were buried together in their hometown of Langenbruck on 10 July 1919.

Mystery still surrounds the death of Bider because the exact circumstances of his crash were never publicized for decades. A crash investigation found that the plane's engine and control cables were all in working order at the time. As mechanical issues were not the cause, the official report theorized that the swiftness of one of Bider's manoeuvres probably resulted in his loss of consciousness. However, this conclusion has been questioned because it was not published until decades after Bider's death and to the leadership of the Swiss Army "a military pilot and aviator does not take his life!" (Ein Militärpilot und Fliegeridol nimmt sich sicher nicht das Leben!).

== Honors ==
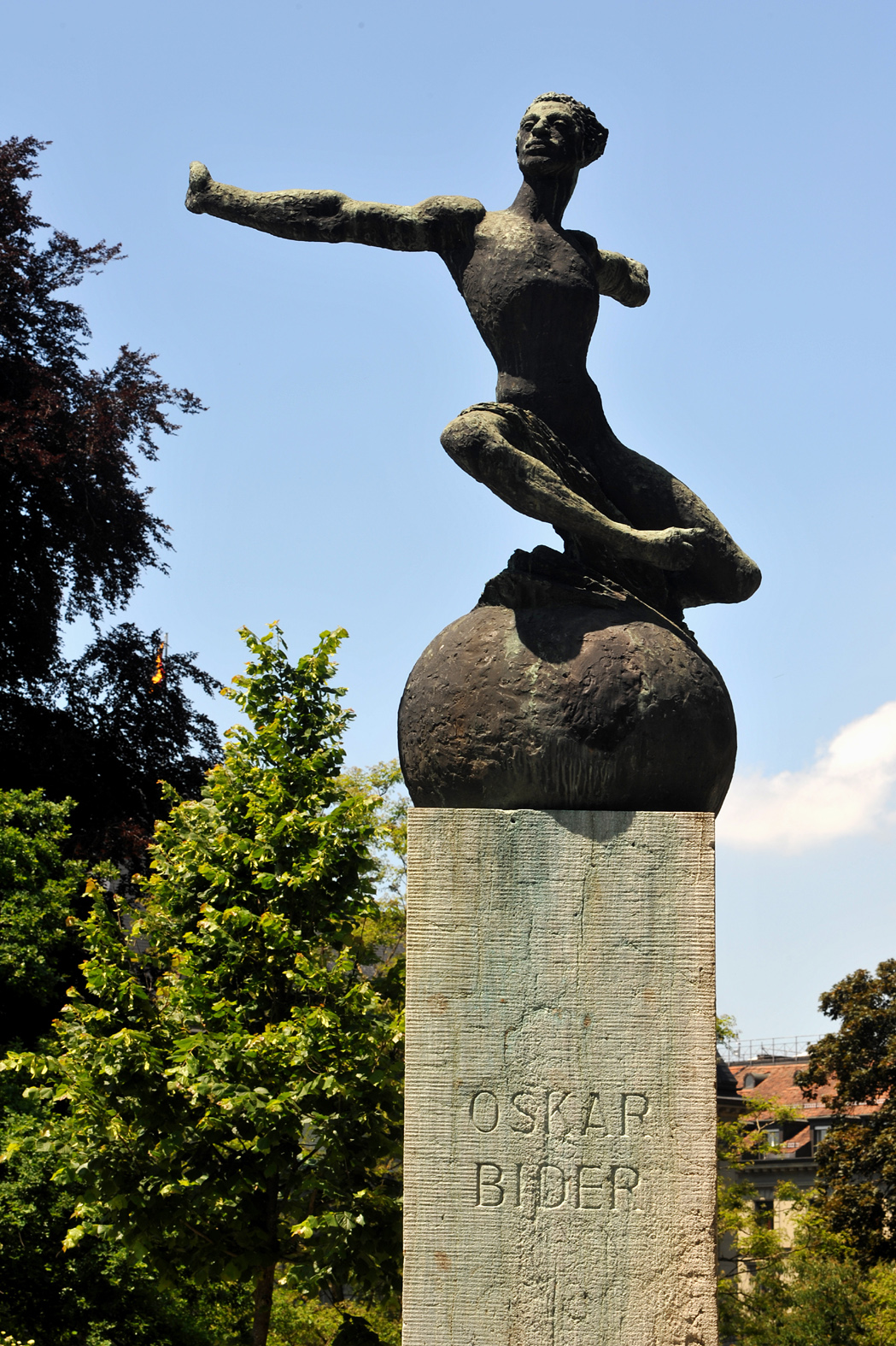
Bider memorial by Hermann Haller in Bern

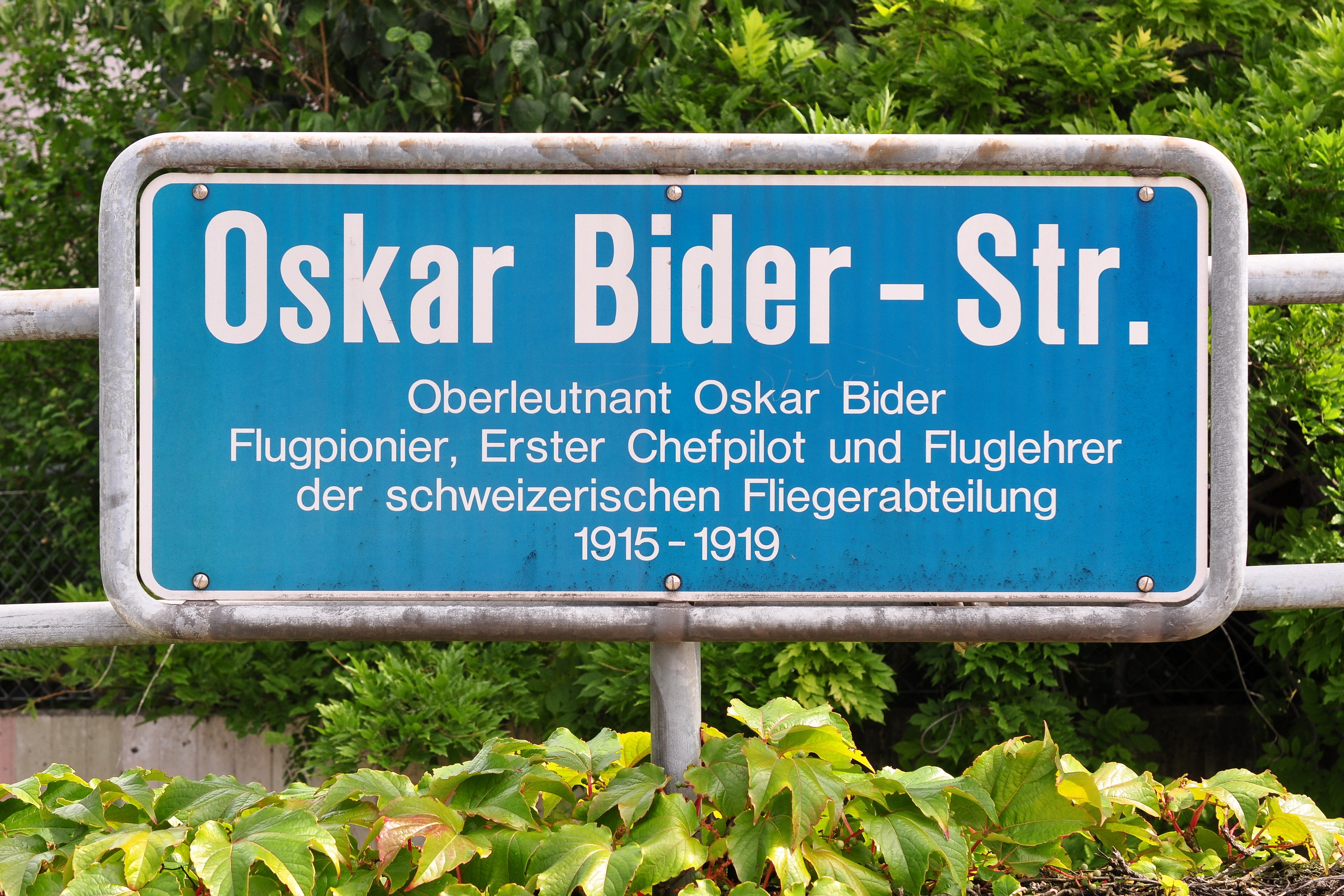
Oskar Bider-Strasse in Dübendorf

In Bern, a monument designed by Hermann Haller remembers Bider's aeronautical services.

Several streets were named after him: "Oskar Bider-Strasse" in Langenbruck, Dübendorf, Liestal and Zürich and "rue Oscar Bider" in Sion and Geneva.

Among other Swiss air pioneers, he is commemorated with a Swiss postage stamp issued in 1977.

The Bider-Hangar, called after Oskar, one of the hangars at Bern Airport, is listed as a heritage site in the November 2008 review draft of the Swiss Inventory of Cultural Property of National and Regional Significance.
