= Langenbruck =

- Municipality
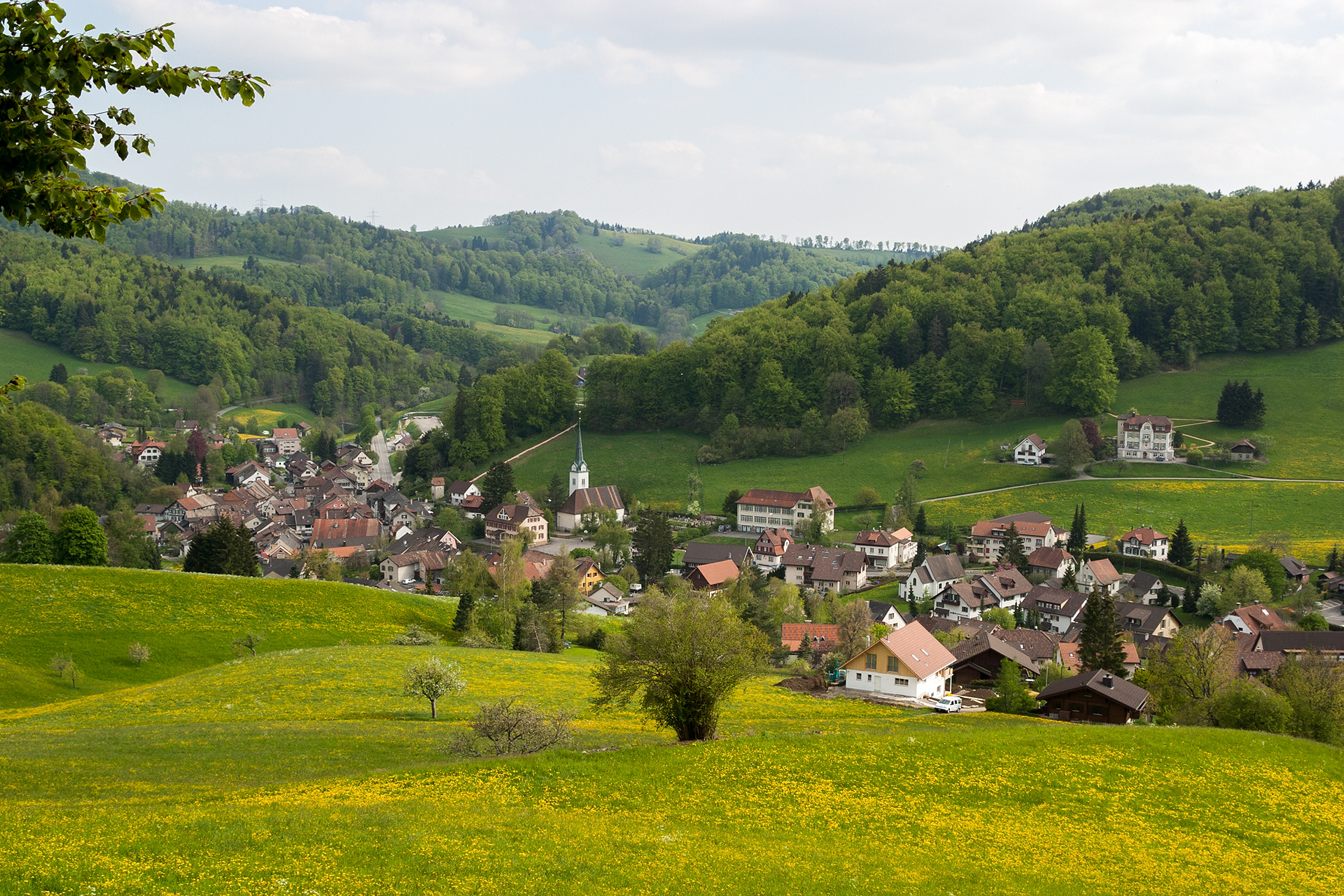

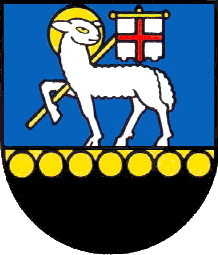
- Coat of arms
- Location of Langenbruck
- Location within Switzerland Location within Canton of Basel-Landschaft
- Coordinates: 47°21′N 7°46′E
- Country: Switzerland
- Canton: Basel-Landschaft
- District: Waldenburg

Area
  - Total: 15.69 km^{2} (6.06 sq mi)
- Elevation: 734 m (2,408 ft)

Population (June 2021)
  - Total: 958
  - Density: 61.1/km^{2} (158/sq mi)
- Time zone: UTC+01:00 (CET)
  - Summer (DST): UTC+02:00 (CEST)
- Postal code: 4438
- SFOS number: 2888
- ISO 3166 code: CH-BL
- Surrounded by: Bennwil, Egerkingen (SO), Eptingen, Hägendorf (SO), Holderbank (SO), Mümliswil-Ramiswil (SO), Oberdorf, Waldenburg
- Website: www.langenbruck.ch

Langenbruck is a municipality in the district of Waldenburg in the canton of Basel-Landschaft in Switzerland.

== History ==
Langenbruck is first mentioned in 1145 as Langebruccho.

== Geography ==
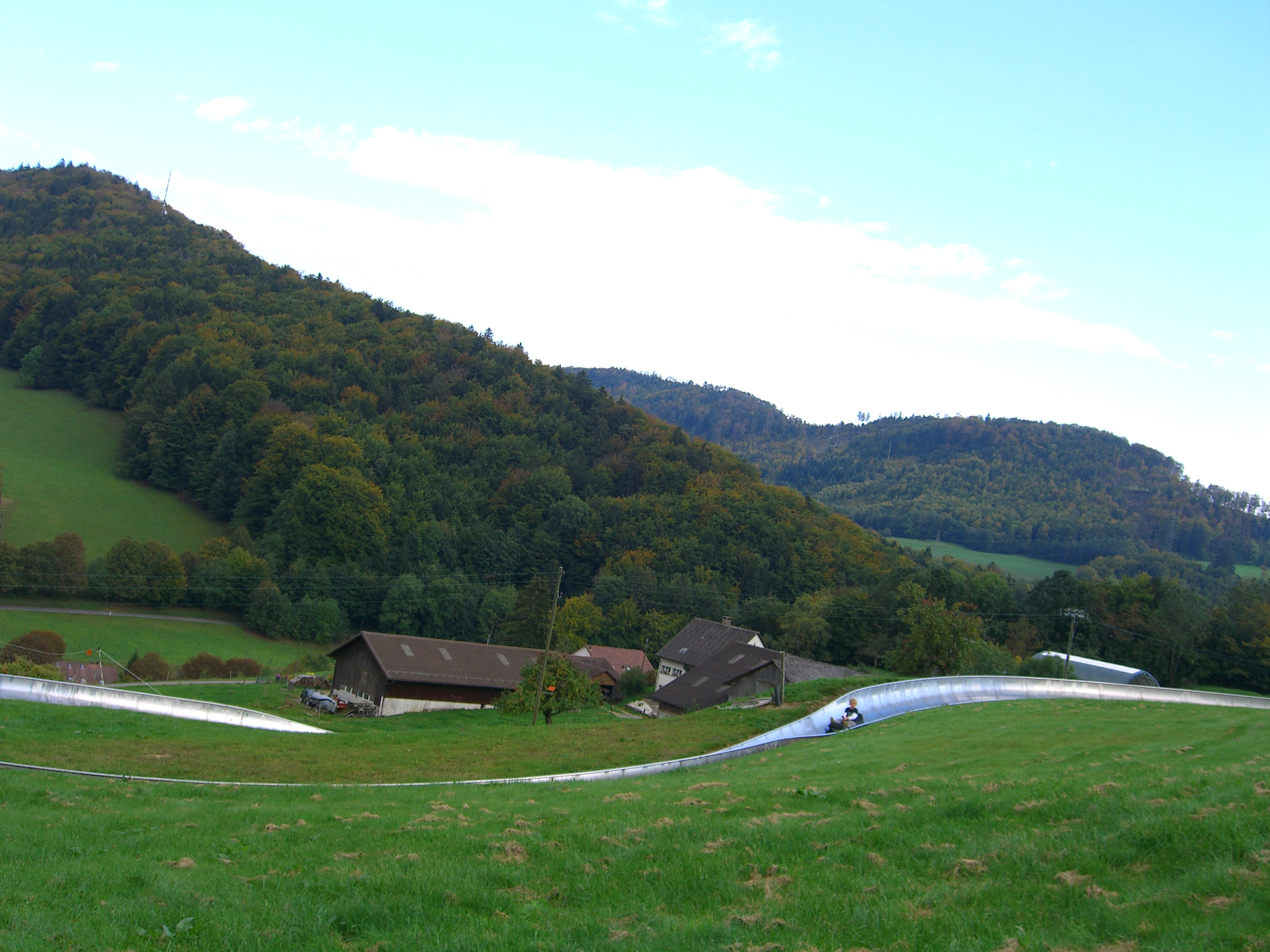
Hillside and bobsled track outside Langenbruck

Aerial view (1947)

Langenbruck has an area, as of 2009, of 15.69 square kilometers (6.06 sq mi). Of this area, 8.01 km^{2} (3.09 sq mi) or 51.1% is used for agricultural purposes, while 6.93 km^{2} (2.68 sq mi) or 44.2% is forested. Of the rest of the land, 0.74 km^{2} (0.29 sq mi) or 4.7% is settled (buildings or roads), 0.04 km^{2} (9.9 acres) or 0.3% is either rivers or lakes.

Of the built up area, housing and buildings made up 2.2% and transportation infrastructure made up 2.1%. Out of the forested land, 41.8% of the total land area is heavily forested and 2.4% is covered with orchards or small clusters of trees. Of the agricultural land, 0.9% is used for growing crops and 32.4% is pastures and 17.1% is used for alpine pastures. All the water in the municipality is flowing water.

The municipality is located in the Waldenburg district, on the south side of the Oberen Hauenstein. It consists of the linear village of Langenbruck, the hamlet of Bärenwil and numerous individual farm houses.

== Coat of arms ==
The blazon of the municipal coat of arms is Gules, over a base Sable, on a Bridge Or a Paschal Lamb passant holding a banner Argent, a cross Gules.

== Demographics ==
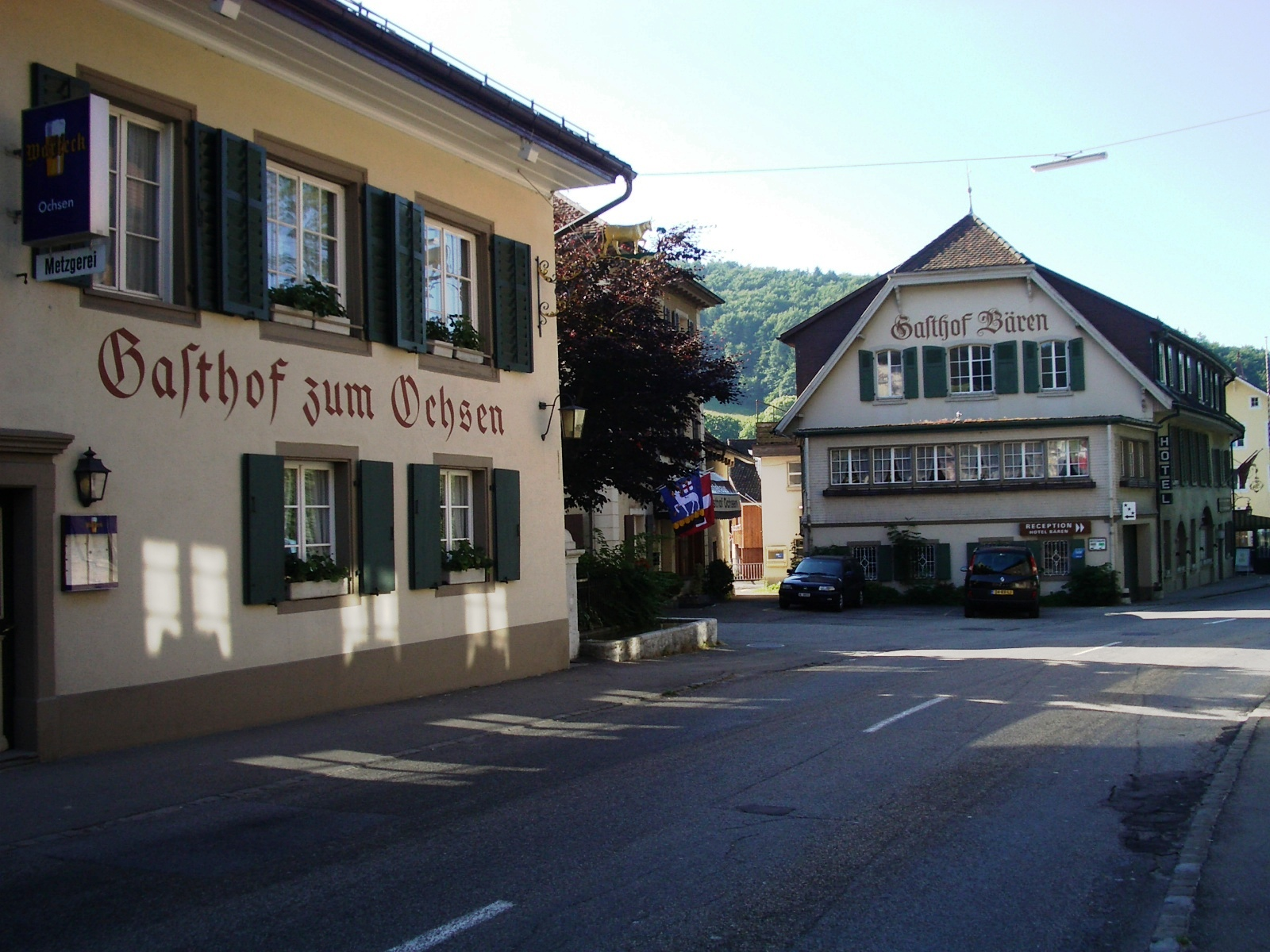
Buildings in Langenbruck

Langenbruck has a population (as of June 2021) of 958. As of 2008, 14.8% of the population are resident foreign nationals. Over the last 10 years (1997–2007) the population has changed at a rate of 1.6%.

Most of the population (as of 2000) speaks German (843 or 90.7%), with Serbo-Croatian being second most common (16 or 1.7%) and Italian language being third (15 or 1.6%). There are 8 people who speak French and 1 person who speaks Romansh.

As of 2008, the gender distribution of the population was 51.4% male and 48.6% female. The population was made up of 832 Swiss citizens (83.5% of the population), and 165 non-Swiss residents (16.5%) Of the population in the municipality 283 or about 30.5% were born in Langenbruck and lived there in 2000. There were 139 or 15.0% who were born in the same canton, while 305 or 32.8% were born somewhere else in Switzerland, and 168 or 18.1% were born outside of Switzerland.

In 2008 there were 8 live births to Swiss citizens and 2 births to non-Swiss citizens, and in same time span there were 13 deaths of Swiss citizens. Ignoring immigration and emigration, the population of Swiss citizens decreased by 5 while the foreign population increased by 2. There was 1 Swiss man who emigrated from Switzerland. At the same time, there were 9 non-Swiss men and 3 non-Swiss women who immigrated from another country to Switzerland. The total Swiss population change in 2008 (from all sources, including moves across municipal borders) was a decrease of 6 and the non-Swiss population increased by 10 people. This represents a population growth rate of 0.4%.

The age distribution, as of 2010, in Langenbruck is; 52 children or 5.2% of the population are between 0 and 6 years old and 160 teenagers or 16.0% are between 7 and 19. Of the adult population, 117 people or 11.7% of the population are between 20 and 29 years old. 122 people or 12.2% are between 30 and 39, 169 people or 17.0% are between 40 and 49, and 241 people or 24.2% are between 50 and 64. The senior population distribution is 105 people or 10.5% of the population are between 65 and 79 years old and there are 31 people or 3.1% who are over 80.

As of 2000, there were 427 people who were single and never married in the municipality. There were 407 married individuals, 62 widows or widowers and 33 individuals who are divorced.

As of 2000, there were 362 private households in the municipality, and an average of 2.4 persons per household. There were 122 households that consist of only one person and 34 households with five or more people. Out of a total of 377 households that answered this question, 32.4% were households made up of just one person and 3 were adults who lived with their parents. Of the rest of the households, there are 95 married couples without children, 112 married couples with children There were 24 single parents with a child or children. There were 6 households that were made up unrelated people and 15 households that were made some sort of institution or another collective housing.

In 2000 there were 159 single family homes (or 52.6% of the total) out of a total of 302 inhabited buildings. There were 56 multi-family buildings (18.5%), along with 63 multi-purpose buildings that were mostly used for housing (20.9%) and 24 other use buildings (commercial or industrial) that also had some housing (7.9%). Of the single family homes 54 were built before 1919, while 13 were built between 1990 and 2000.

In 2000 there were 466 apartments in the municipality. The most common apartment size was 4 rooms of which there were 123. There were 11 single room apartments and 146 apartments with five or more rooms. Of these apartments, a total of 339 apartments (72.7% of the total) were permanently occupied, while 95 apartments (20.4%) were seasonally occupied and 32 apartments (6.9%) were empty. As of 2009, the construction rate of new housing units was 1 new units per 1000 residents. As of 2000 the average price to rent a two-room apartment was about 724.00 CHF (US$580, £330, €460), a three-room apartment was about 919.00 CHF (US$740, £410, €590) and a four-room apartment cost an average of 1244.00 CHF (US$1000, £560, €800). The vacancy rate for the municipality, in 2010, was 0.21%.

The historical population is given in the following chart:

== Heritage sites of national significance ==
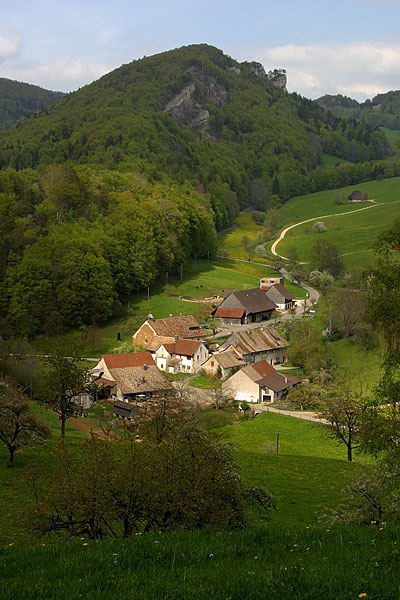
Schöntal area

The medieval mine at Dürsteltal is listed as a Swiss heritage site of national significance. The entire Schöntal area is part of the Inventory of Swiss Heritage Sites.

== Politics ==
In the 2007 federal election the most popular party was the SVP which received 36.54% of the vote. The next three most popular parties were the SP (22.97%), the Green Party (15.33%) and the FDP (14.2%). In the federal election, a total of 378 votes were cast, and the voter turnout was 54.5%.

== Economy ==
As of 2010, Langenbruck had an unemployment rate of 3.6%. As of 2008, there were 76 people employed in the primary economic sector and about 27 businesses involved in this sector. 66 people were employed in the secondary sector and there were 8 businesses in this sector. 171 people were employed in the tertiary sector, with 35 businesses in this sector. There were 484 residents of the municipality who were employed in some capacity, of which females made up 43.6% of the workforce.

In 2008 the total number of full-time equivalent jobs was 240. The number of jobs in the primary sector was 51, all of which were in agriculture. The number of jobs in the secondary sector was 62 of which 36 or (58.1%) were in manufacturing and 25 (40.3%) were in construction. The number of jobs in the tertiary sector was 127. In the tertiary sector; 10 or 7.9% were in wholesale or retail sales or the repair of motor vehicles, 16 or 12.6% were in the movement and storage of goods, 15 or 11.8% were in a hotel or restaurant, 20 or 15.7% were technical professionals or scientists, 11 or 8.7% were in education and 37 or 29.1% were in health care.

In 2000, there were 78 workers who commuted into the municipality and 283 workers who commuted away. The municipality is a net exporter of workers, with about 3.6 workers leaving the municipality for every one entering. Of the working population, 15.9% used public transportation to get to work, and 47.5% used a private car.

== Religion ==
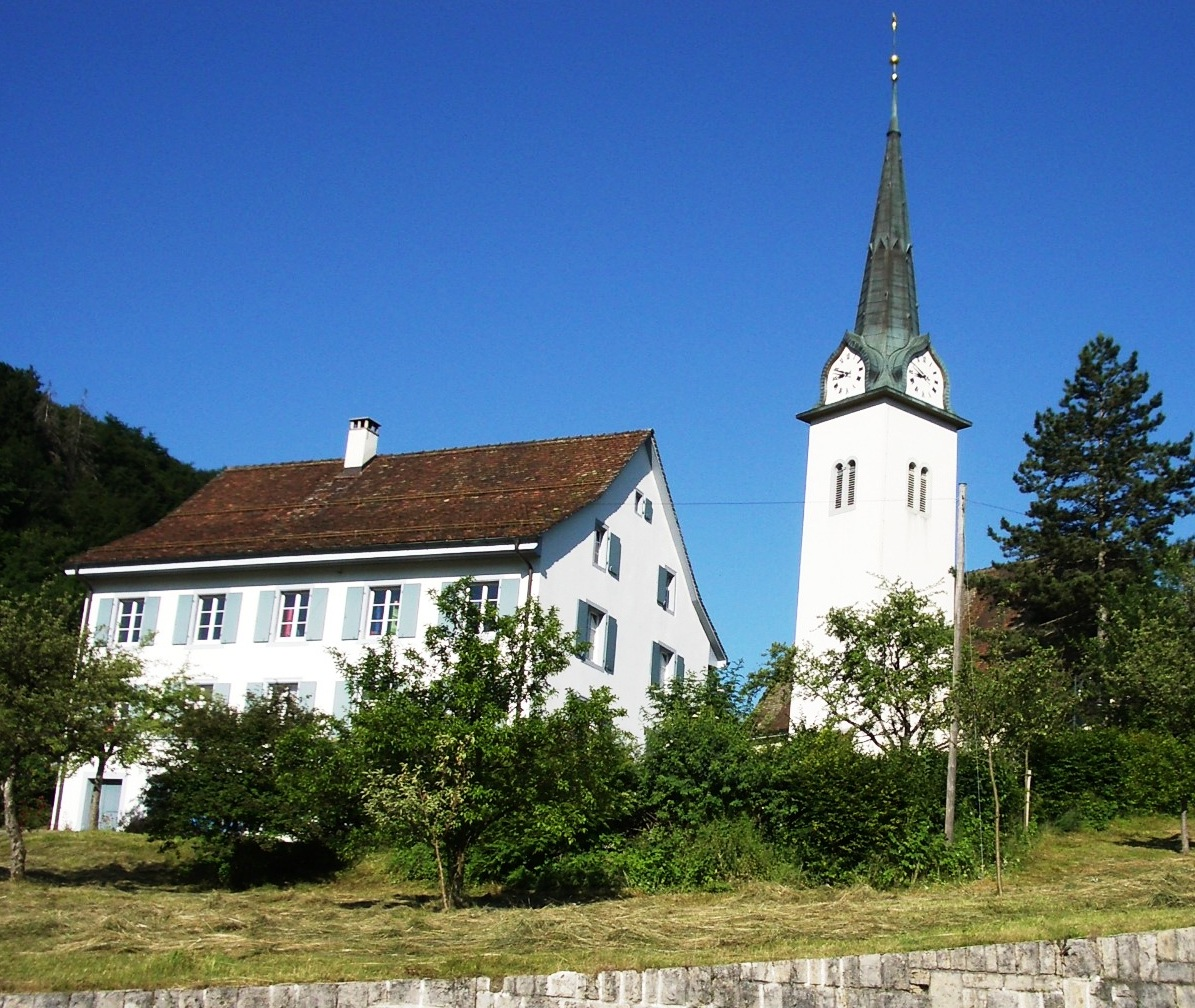
Church in Langenbruck

At the 2000 census, 461 or 49.6% belonged to the Swiss Reformed Church, while 176 or 18.9% were Roman Catholic. Of the rest of the population, there were 25 members of an Orthodox church (or about 2.69% of the population), there were 6 individuals (or about 0.65% of the population) who belonged to the Christian Catholic Church, and there were 35 individuals (or about 3.77% of the population) who belonged to another Christian church. There were 58 (or about 6.24% of the population) who were Islamic. There were 4 individuals who were Hindu and 3 individuals who belonged to another church. 140 (or about 15.07% of the population) belonged to no church, are agnostic or atheist, and 21 individuals (or about 2.26% of the population) did not answer the question.

== Weather ==
Langenbruck has an average of 144.5 days of rain or snow per year and on average receives 1,252 mm (49.3 in) of precipitation. The wettest month is June during which time Langenbruck receives an average of 135 mm (5.3 in) of rain or snow. During this month there is precipitation for an average of 13.3 days. The month with the most days of precipitation is May, with an average of 14.1, but with only 122 mm (4.8 in) of rain or snow. The driest month of the year is October with an average of 87 mm (3.4 in) of precipitation over 9.2 days.

== Education ==
In Langenbruck about 348 or (37.5%) of the population have completed non-mandatory upper secondary education, and 110 or (11.8%) have completed additional higher education (either university or a Fachhochschule). Of the 110 who completed tertiary schooling, 54.5% were Swiss men, 30.0% were Swiss women, 9.1% were non-Swiss men and 6.4% were non-Swiss women.

As of 2000, there were 11 students in Langenbruck who came from another municipality, while 96 residents attended schools outside the municipality.

== Notable people ==
- Oskar Bider, Swiss aviation pioneer
