= Passwang Pass =

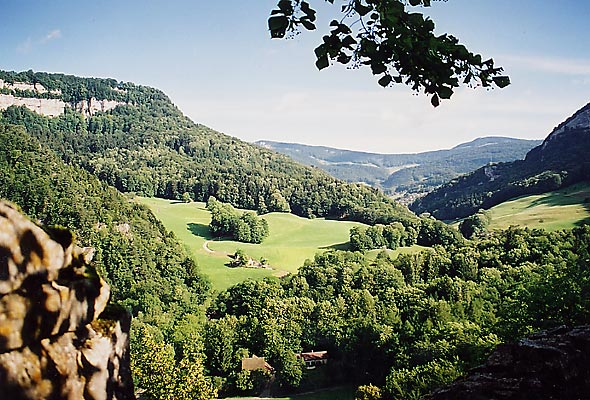
- Passwang Pass

- Location within Switzerland
- Elevation: 1,204 metres (3,950 ft)
- Traversed by: Road

Third Approach
- Location: Solothurn, Switzerland
- Range: Jura Mountains
- Coordinates: 47°21′30″N 07°39′22″E

Passwang Pass (elevation 1,204 m (3,950 ft)) is a high mountain pass in the Jura Mountains in the canton of Solothurn in Switzerland.

It connects the southern part of the canton of Solothurn via Mümliswil-Ramiswil (south of the pass) and Beinwil, Solothurn (northern side) with the so-called Schwarzbubenland (officially Amtei Dorneck-Thierstein, consisting of the canton of Solothurn districts Thierstein and Dorneck) north of the Passwang mountain chain, and ultimately with the Laufen District in the canton of Basel-Landschaft.

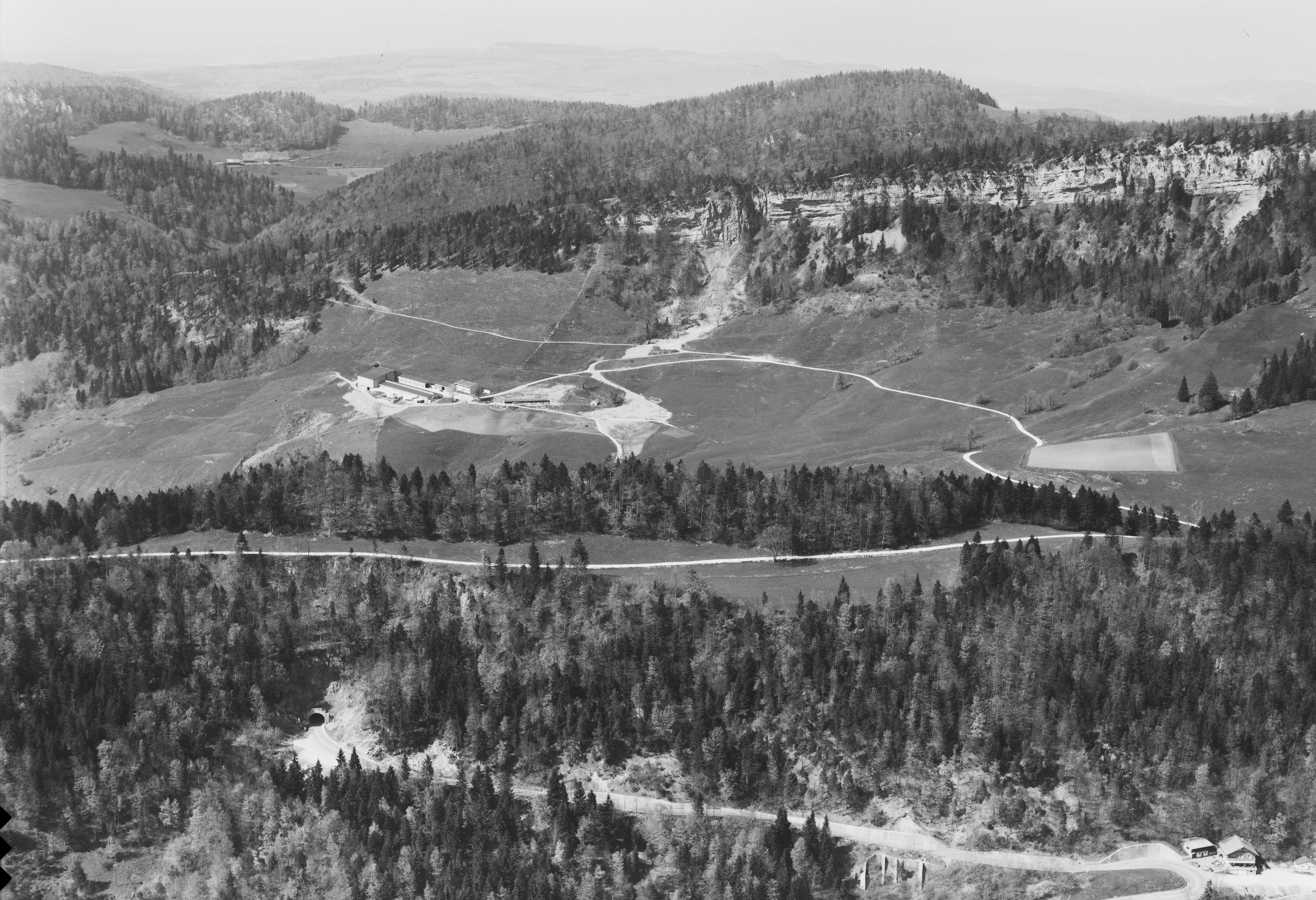
Aerial view (1965)

== See also ==
- List of highest paved roads in Europe
- List of mountain passes
- List of the highest Swiss passes
