= Oberer Hauenstein Pass =

Mountain pass in Switzerland

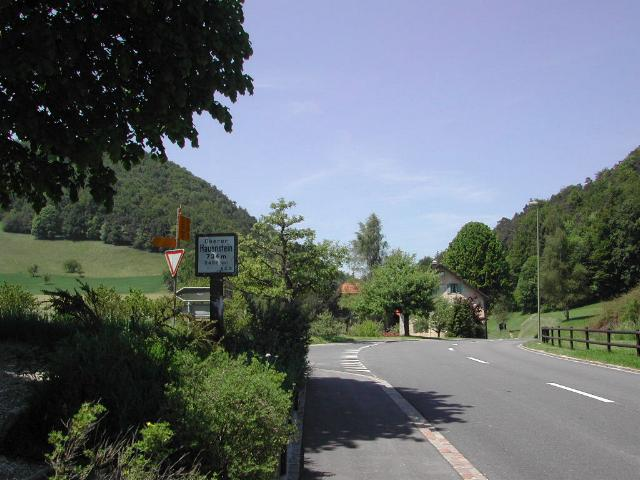
- Oberer Hauenstein Pass
- Interactive map of Oberer Hauenstein Pass
- Elevation: 731 metres (2,398 ft)

Third Approach
- Location: Switzerland
- Range: Jura Mountains
- Coordinates: 47°21′6″N 7°45′50″E

Oberer Hauenstein Pass (el. 731 m.) is a mountain pass in the Jura Mountains on the border between the cantons of Basel-Country and Solothurn in Switzerland.

It connects Balsthal and Waldenburg.
