= Rohr, Switzerland =

Rohr, Switzerland may refer to:

- Rohr, Aargau (Rohr AG)
- Rohr, Solothurn (Rohr SO)
