= List of mayors of Trimbach =

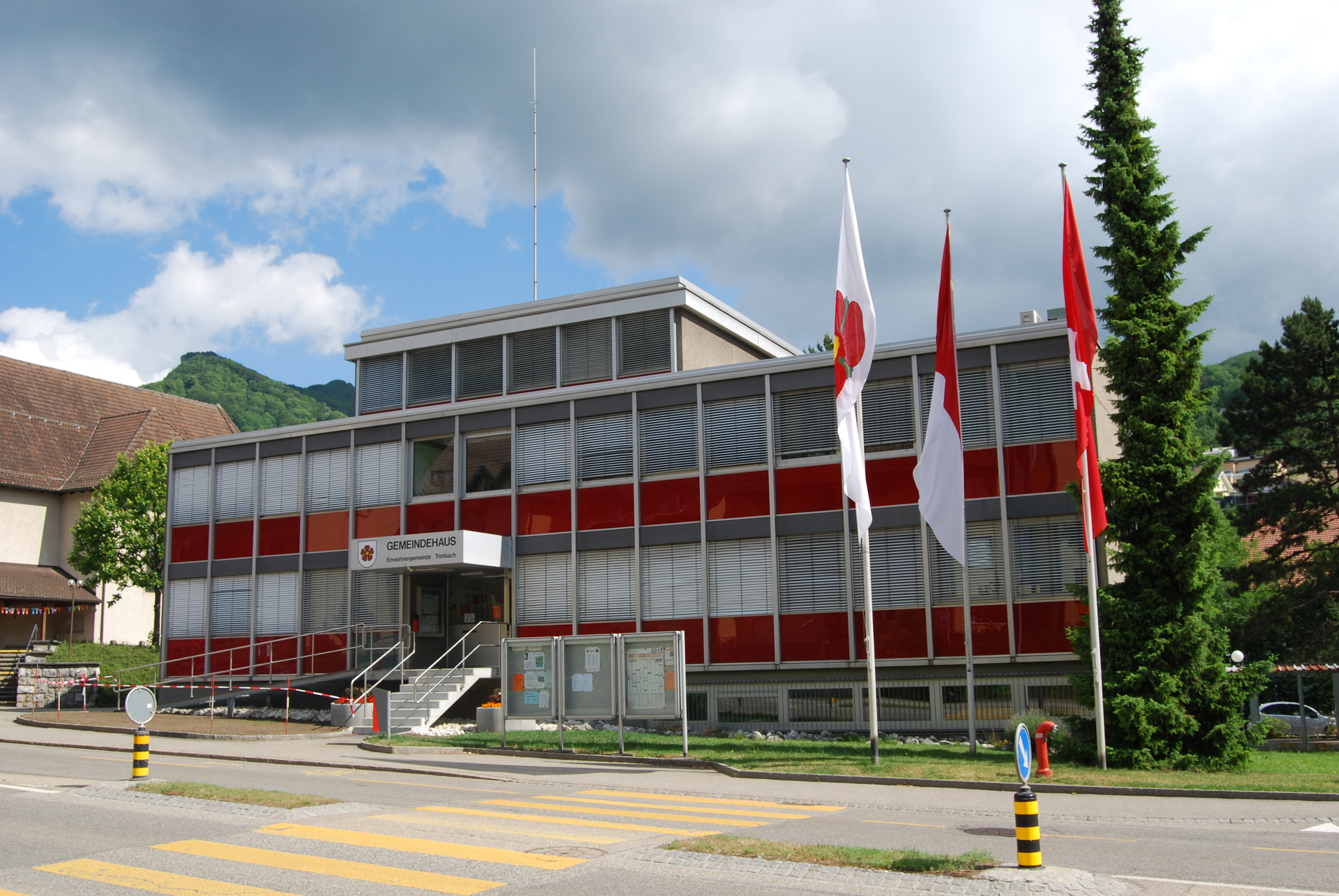
Gemeindehaus Trimbach

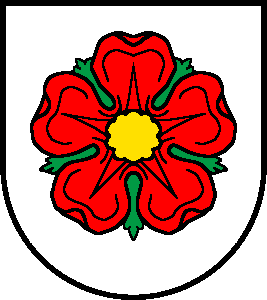
Coat of arms of Trimbach

This is a list of mayors of Trimbach, Canton of Solothurn, Switzerland. The mayor of Trimbach (Gemeindepräsident von Trimbach) chairs the municipal council (Gemeinderat).

Mayor of Trimback
Term	Mayor	Lifespan	Party	Notes
1900–1922	Albert Lehmann		Volkspartei	
1923–1945	Alphons von Felten		Volkspartei	
1945–1957	Paul Berlinger		SPS/PSS	
1957–1969	Adolf Bader		Volkspartei/CVP	
1969–1975	William Frey		SPS/PSS	
1975–1983	Josef Reichmuth		CVP/PDC	
1983–1997	Ernst Gomm		SPS/PSS	
1997–2009	Martin Straumann		SPS/PSS	
2009–present	Karl Tanner	(born 1952)	SPS/PSS	
