= Trimbach, Switzerland =

Trimbach
- Municipality
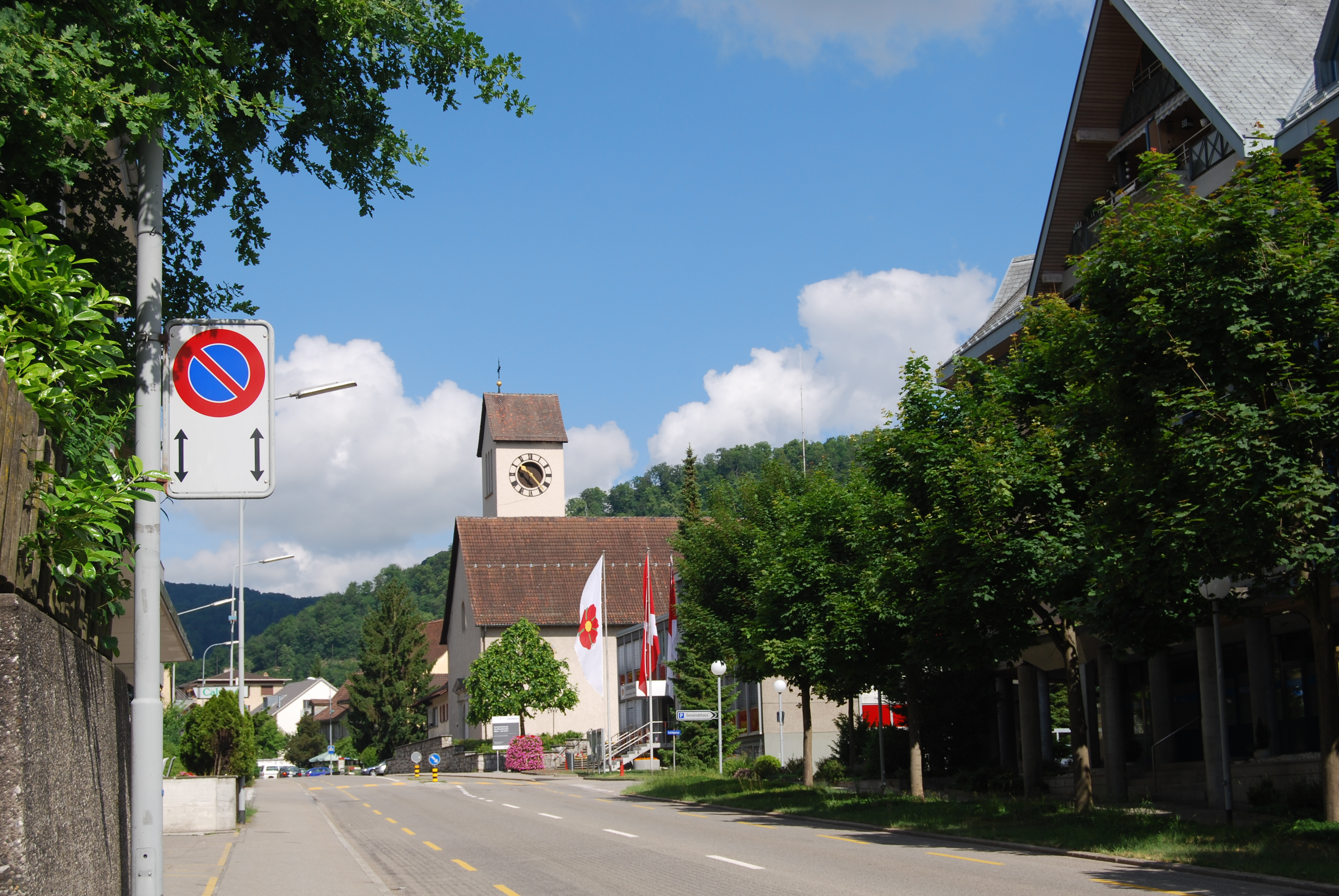

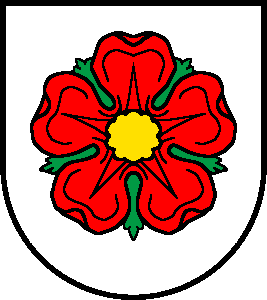
- Coat of arms
- Location of Trimbach
- Location within Switzerland Location within Canton of Solothurn
- Coordinates: 47°22′N 7°54′E
- Country: Switzerland
- Canton: Solothurn
- District: Gösgen

Government
  - Executive: Gemeinderat with 5 members
  - Mayor: Gemeindepräsident (list); Karl Tanner SPS/PSS (as of March 2014)

Area
  - Total: 7.62 km^{2} (2.94 sq mi)
- Elevation: 419 m (1,375 ft)

Population (December 2020)
  - Total: 6,562
  - Density: 861/km^{2} (2,230/sq mi)
- Time zone: UTC+01:00 (CET)
  - Summer (DST): UTC+02:00 (CEST)
- Postal code: 4632
- SFOS number: 2500
- ISO 3166 code: CH-SO
- Surrounded by: Hauenstein-Ifenthal, Lostorf, Olten, Wangen bei Olten, Winznau, Wisen
- Website: www.trimbach.ch

Trimbach is a municipality in the district of Gösgen in the canton of Solothurn in Switzerland.

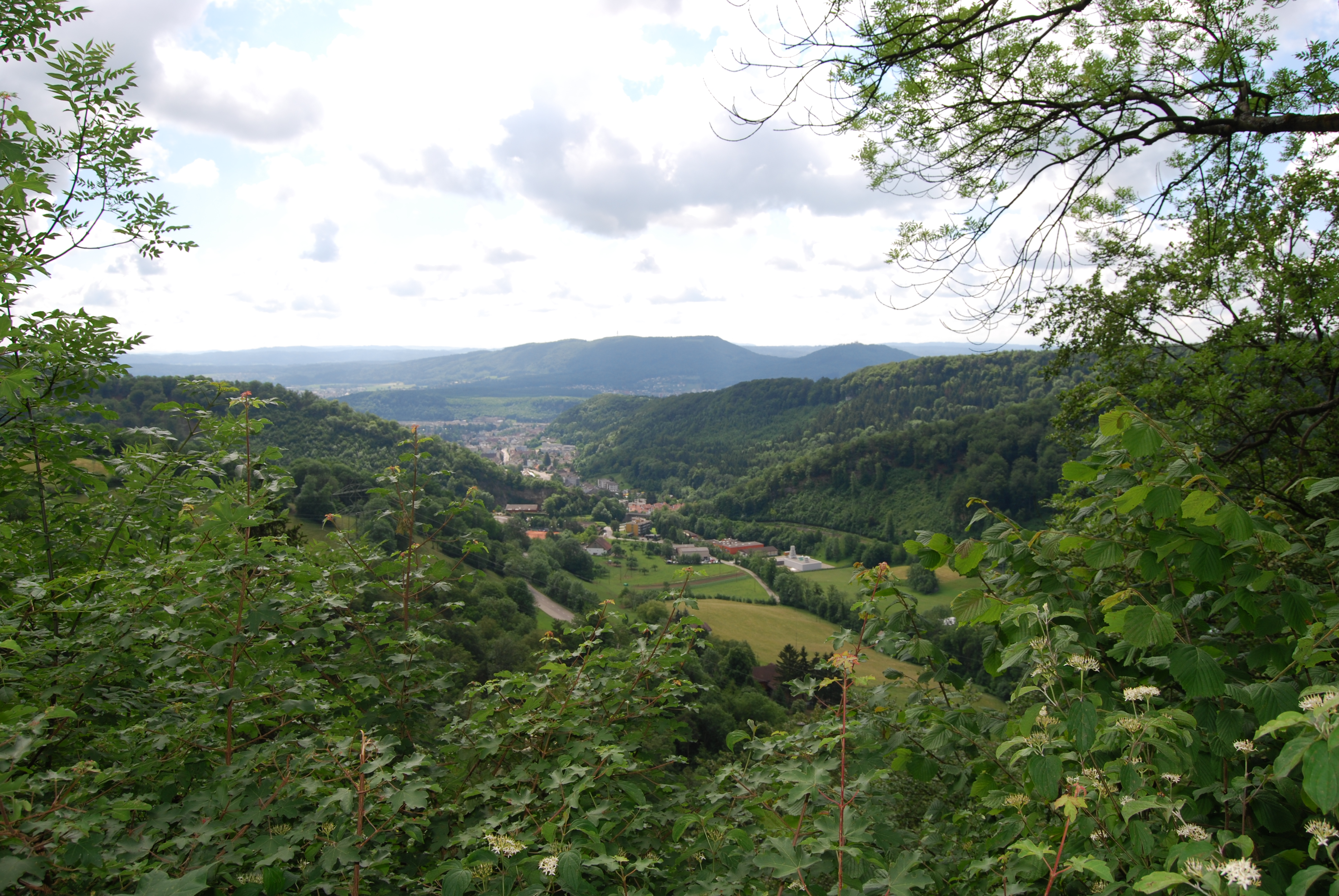
Trimbach

== History ==
Trimbach is first mentioned in 1244 as Trinbach.

== Geography ==
Aerial view from 500 m by Walter Mittelholzer (1919)

Trimbach has an area, as of 2009, of 7.62 square kilometers (2.94 sq mi). Of this area, 1.77 km^{2} (0.68 sq mi) or 23.2% is used for agricultural purposes, while 3.99 km^{2} (1.54 sq mi) or 52.4% is forested. Of the rest of the land, 1.81 km^{2} (0.70 sq mi) or 23.8% is settled (buildings or roads), 0.08 km^{2} (20 acres) or 1.0% is either rivers or lakes.

Of the built up area, industrial buildings made up 2.1% of the total area while housing and buildings made up 11.9% and transportation infrastructure made up 7.7%. while parks, green belts and sports fields made up 1.3%. Out of the forested land, 50.9% of the total land area is heavily forested and 1.4% is covered with orchards or small clusters of trees. Of the agricultural land, 3.0% is used for growing crops and 17.7% is pastures, while 1.2% is used for orchards or vine crops and 1.3% is used for alpine pastures. All the water in the municipality is flowing water.

The municipality is located in the Gösgen district, between the Aare river and the Hauenstein Pass. It is part of the suburbs of the city of Olten. It consists of the village of Trimbach and the settlements and individual houses of Rumpel, Miesern, Mahrenacker, Erlimoos and Frohburg.

The municipalities of Hauenstein-Ifenthal, Trimbach, Wisen and Olten are considering a merger at a date in the future into the new municipality of with an, as of 2011, undetermined name.

== Coat of arms ==
The blazon of the municipal coat of arms is Argent a Rose Gules barbed and seeded proper.

== Demographics ==
Trimbach has a population (as of December 2020) of 6,562. As of 2008, 34.2% of the population are resident foreign nationals. Over the last 10 years (1999–2009 ) the population has changed at a rate of -0.6%.

Most of the population (as of 2000) speaks German (4,947 or 80.1%), with Italian being second most common (430 or 7.0%) and Turkish being third (178 or 2.9%). There are 35 people who speak French and 5 people who speak Romansh.

As of 2008, the gender distribution of the population was 49.1% male and 50.9% female. The population was made up of 1,878 Swiss men (29.9% of the population) and 1,201 (19.2%) non-Swiss men. There were 2,137 Swiss women (34.1%) and 1,055 (16.8%) non-Swiss women. Of the population in the municipality 1,809 or about 29.3% were born in Trimbach and lived there in 2000. There were 1,192 or 19.3% who were born in the same canton, while 1,494 or 24.2% were born somewhere else in Switzerland, and 1,474 or 23.9% were born outside of Switzerland.

In 2008 there were 28 live births to Swiss citizens and 23 births to non-Swiss citizens, and in same time span there were 42 deaths of Swiss citizens and 8 non-Swiss citizen deaths. Ignoring immigration and emigration, the population of Swiss citizens decreased by 14 while the foreign population increased by 15. There were 6 Swiss men and 1 Swiss woman who immigrated back to Switzerland. At the same time, there were 16 non-Swiss men and 20 non-Swiss women who immigrated from another country to Switzerland. The total Swiss population change in 2008 (from all sources, including moves across municipal borders) was an increase of 29 and the non-Swiss population increased by 36 people. This represents a population growth rate of 1.1%.

The age distribution, as of 2000, in Trimbach is: 479 children or 7.8% of the population are between 0 and 6 years old and 958 teenagers or 15.5% are between 7 and 19. Of the adult population, 366 people or 5.9% of the population are between 20 and 24 years old. 1,782 people or 28.9% are between 25 and 44, and 1,534 people or 24.9% are between 45 and 64. The senior population distribution is 823 people or 13.3% of the population are between 65 and 79 years old and there are 231 people or 3.7% who are over 80.

As of 2000, there were 2,416 people who were single and never married in the municipality. There were 3,005 married individuals, 430 widows or widowers and 322 individuals who are divorced.

As of 2000, there were 2,700 private households in the municipality, and an average of 2.2 persons per household. There were 970 households that consist of only one person and 174 households with five or more people. Out of a total of 2,749 households that answered this question, 35.3% were households made up of just one person and there were 21 adults who lived with their parents. Of the rest of the households, there are 758 married couples without children, 773 married couples with children. There were 151 single parents with a child or children. There were 27 households that were made up of unrelated people and 49 households that were made up of some sort of institution or another collective housing.

In 2000 there were 757 single family homes (or 62.4% of the total) out of a total of 1,213 inhabited buildings. There were 286 multi-family buildings (23.6%), along with 107 multi-purpose buildings that were mostly used for housing (8.8%) and 63 other use buildings (commercial or industrial) that also had some housing (5.2%). Of the single family homes 97 were built before 1919, while 79 were built between 1990 and 2000. The greatest number of single family homes (234) were built between 1946 and 1960.

In 2000 there were 3,057 apartments in the municipality. The most common apartment size was 4 rooms of which there were 1,008. There were 136 single room apartments and 700 apartments with five or more rooms. Of these apartments, a total of 2,647 apartments (86.6% of the total) were permanently occupied, while 247 apartments (8.1%) were seasonally occupied and 163 apartments (5.3%) were empty. As of 2009, the construction rate of new housing units was 3.1 new units per 1000 residents. The vacancy rate for the municipality, in 2010, was 3.29%.

The historical population is given in the following chart:

== Heritage sites of national significance ==
The Ruins of Frohburg Castle (from the 12th-14th Century) are listed as a Swiss heritage site of national significance.

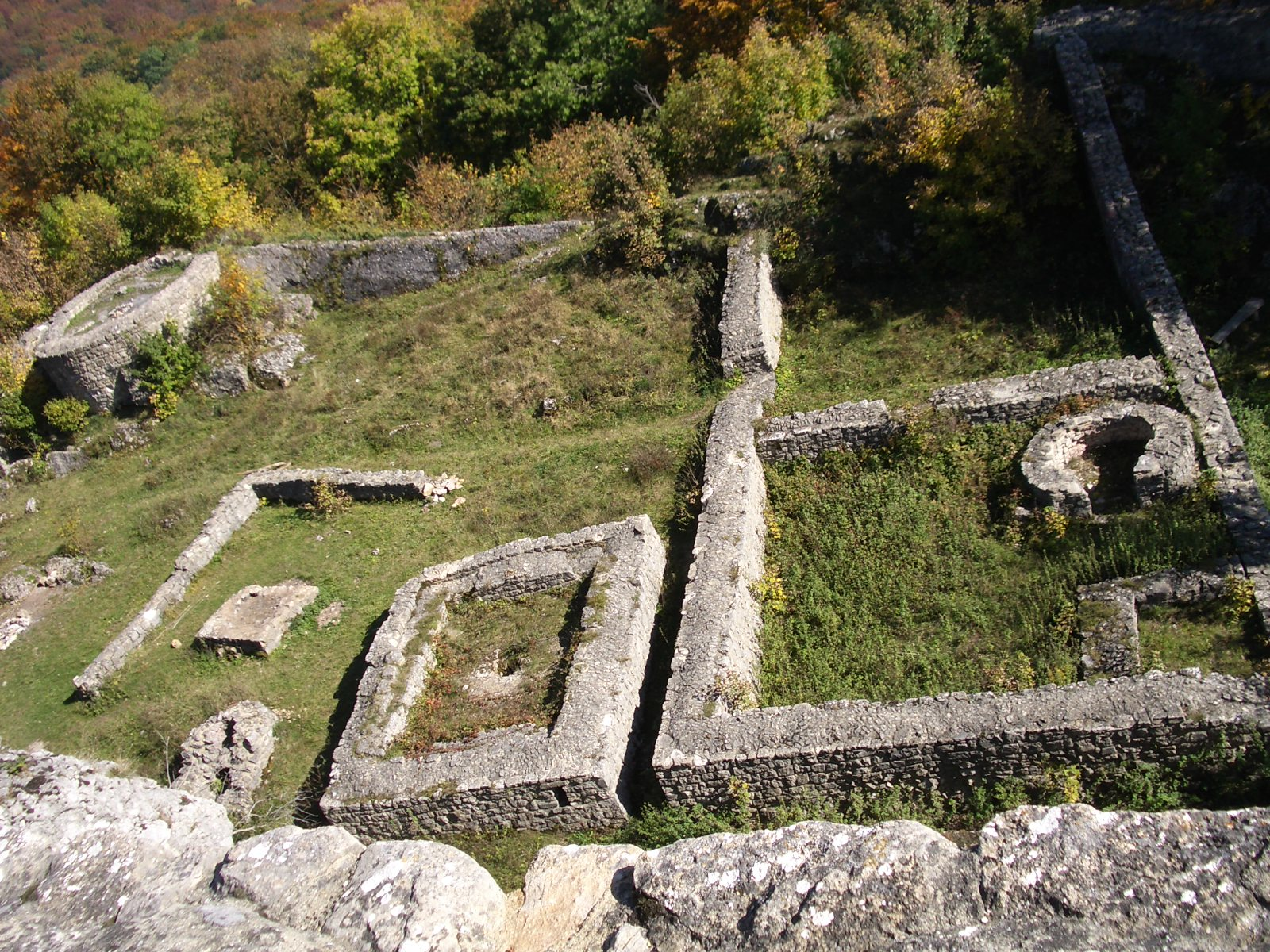
Frohburg Castle

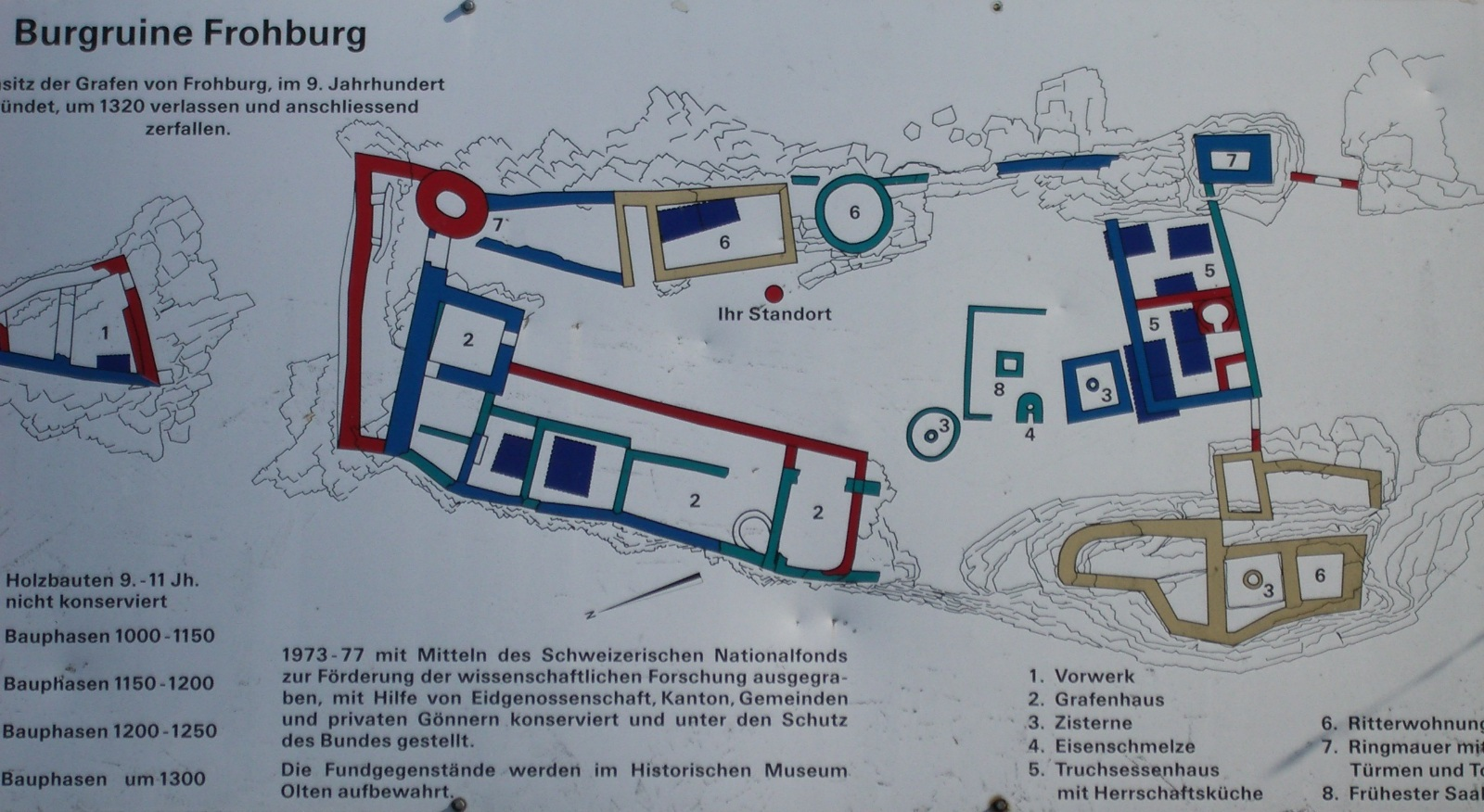
Castle plan

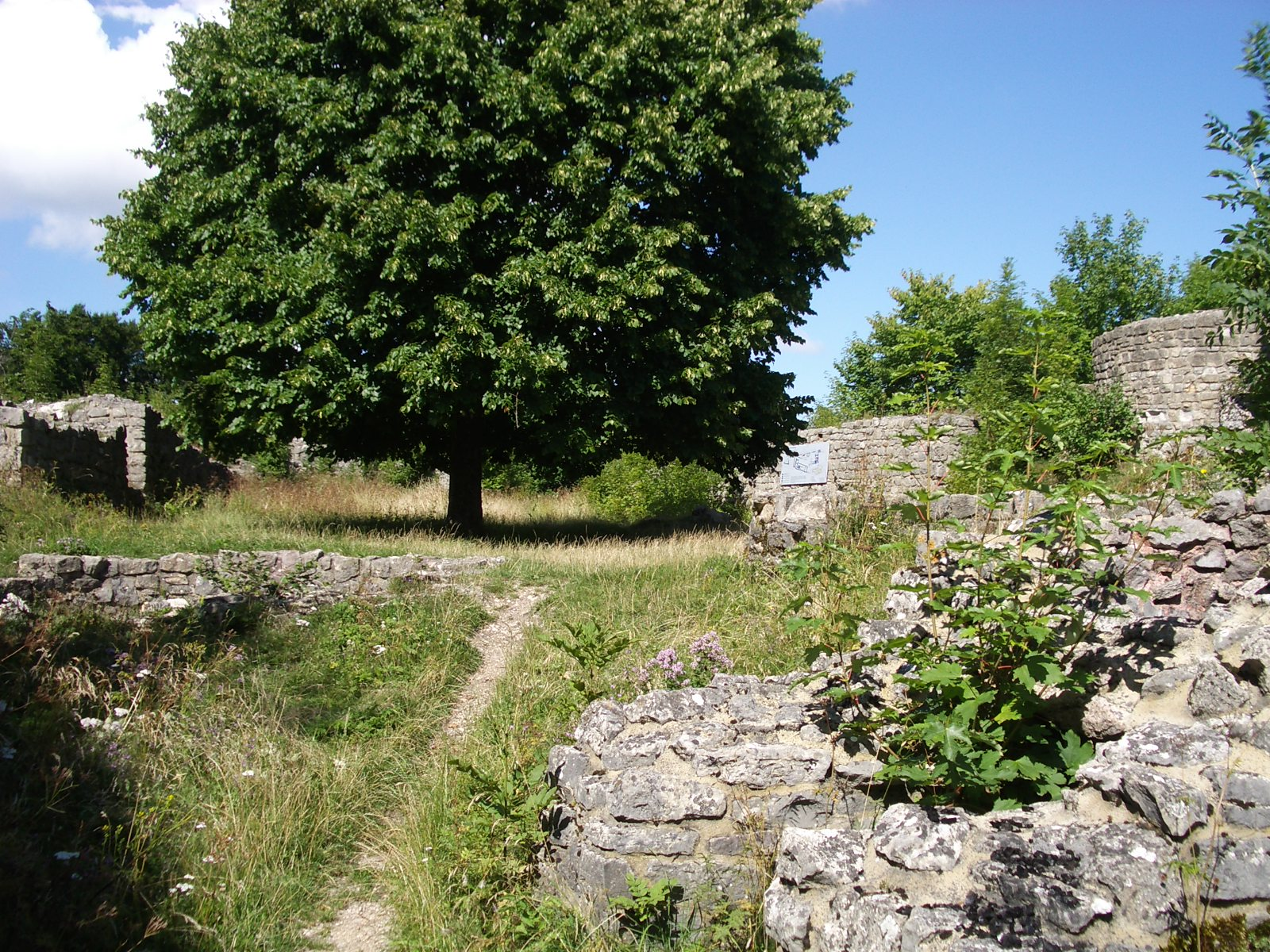
Frohburg Castle

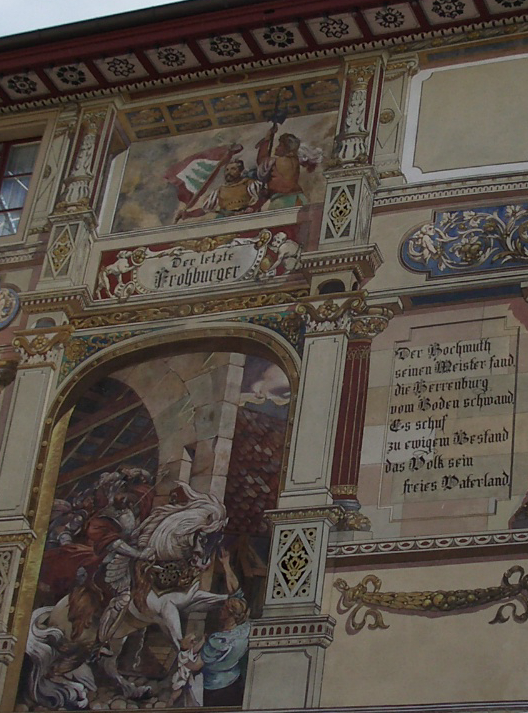
Painting of the last of the Frohburg line

== Politics ==
In the 2007 federal election the most popular party was the SVP which received 28.23% of the vote. The next three most popular parties were the SP (27.14%), the CVP (16.75%) and the FDP (14.27%). In the federal election, a total of 1,564 votes were cast, and the voter turnout was 45.8%.

== Economy ==
As of 2010, Trimbach had an unemployment rate of 5%. As of 2008, there were 32 people employed in the primary economic sector and about 12 businesses involved in this sector. 646 people were employed in the secondary sector and there were 50 businesses in this sector. 2,008 people were employed in the tertiary sector, with 141 businesses in this sector. There were 3,054 residents of the municipality who were employed in some capacity, of which females made up 43.9% of the workforce.

In 2008 the total number of full-time equivalent jobs was 2,206. The number of jobs in the primary sector was 20, of which 17 were in agriculture and 3 were in forestry or lumber production. The number of jobs in the secondary sector was 563 of which 423 or (75.1%) were in manufacturing and 139 (24.7%) were in construction. The number of jobs in the tertiary sector was 1,623. In the tertiary sector; 199 or 12.3% were in wholesale or retail sales or the repair of motor vehicles, 80 or 4.9% were in the movement and storage of goods, 68 or 4.2% were in a hotel or restaurant, 2 or 0.1% were in the information industry, 5 or 0.3% were the insurance or financial industry, 90 or 5.5% were technical professionals or scientists, 87 or 5.4% were in education and 1,015 or 62.5% were in health care.

In 2000, there were 1,109 workers who commuted into the municipality and 2,311 workers who commuted away. The municipality is a net exporter of workers, with about 2.1 workers leaving the municipality for every one entering. Of the working population, 20.7% used public transportation to get to work, and 47.6% used a private car.

== Religion ==
From the 2000 census, 2,680 or 43.4% were Roman Catholic, while 1,563 or 25.3% belonged to the Swiss Reformed Church. Of the rest of the population, there were 137 members of an Orthodox church (or about 2.22% of the population), there were 110 individuals (or about 1.78% of the population) who belonged to the Christian Catholic Church, and there were 92 individuals (or about 1.49% of the population) who belonged to another Christian church. There were 2 individuals (or about 0.03% of the population) who were Jewish, and 619 (or about 10.03% of the population) who were Islamic. There were 30 individuals who were Buddhist, 58 individuals who were Hindu and 8 individuals who belonged to another church. 655 (or about 10.61% of the population) belonged to no church, are agnostic or atheist, and 219 individuals (or about 3.55% of the population) did not answer the question.

== Transport ==
Trimbach sits on the Hauenstein line and is served by trains at Trimbach railway station.

== Education ==
In Trimbach about 2,123 or (34.4%) of the population have completed non-mandatory upper secondary education, and 515 or (8.3%) have completed additional higher education (either university or a Fachhochschule). Of the 515 who completed tertiary schooling, 62.1% were Swiss men, 19.6% were Swiss women, 11.8% were non-Swiss men and 6.4% were non-Swiss women.

During the 2010-2011 school year there were a total of 693 students in the Trimbach school system. The education system in the Canton of Solothurn allows young children to attend two years of non-obligatory Kindergarten. During that school year, there were 113 children in kindergarten. The canton's school system requires students to attend six years of primary school, with some of the children attending smaller, specialized classes. In the municipality there were 322 students in primary school and 46 students in the special, smaller classes. The secondary school program consists of three lower, obligatory years of schooling, followed by three to five years of optional, advanced schools. 212 lower secondary students attend school in Trimbach.

As of 2000, there were 44 students in Trimbach who came from another municipality, while 150 residents attended schools outside the municipality.
