= Winznau =

- Municipality
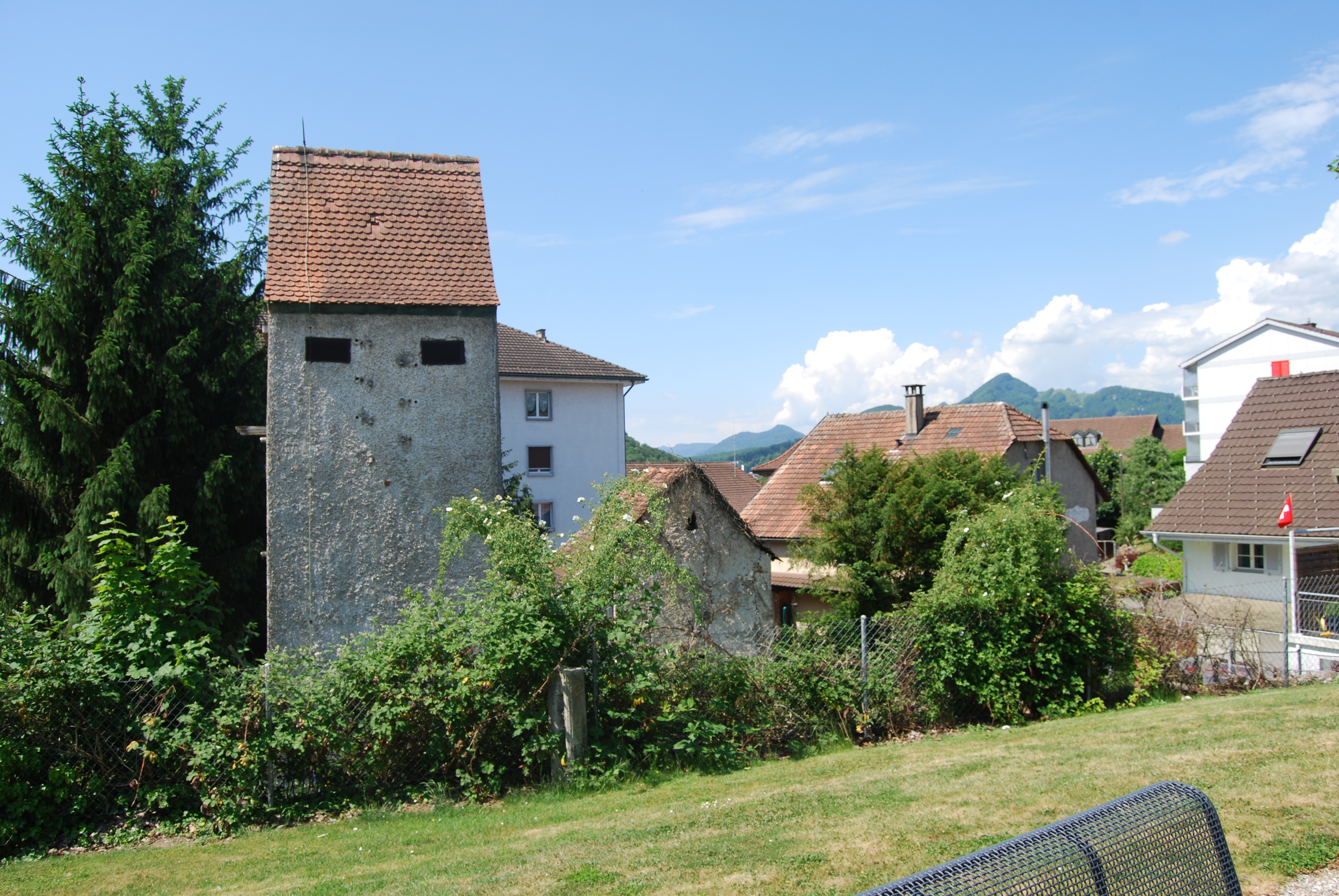

- Coat of arms
- Location of Winznau
- Location within Switzerland Location within Canton of Solothurn
- Coordinates: 47°22′N 7°56′E
- Country: Switzerland
- Canton: Solothurn
- District: Gösgen

Area
  - Total: 3.94 km^{2} (1.52 sq mi)
- Elevation: 403 m (1,322 ft)

Population (December 2020)
  - Total: 1,968
  - Density: 499/km^{2} (1,290/sq mi)
- Time zone: UTC+01:00 (CET)
  - Summer (DST): UTC+02:00 (CEST)
- Postal code: 4652
- SFOS number: 2501
- ISO 3166 code: CH-SO
- Surrounded by: Dulliken, Lostorf, Obergösgen, Olten, Trimbach
- Website: www.winznau.ch

Winznau is a municipality in the district of Gösgen in the canton of Solothurn in Switzerland.

== Geography ==
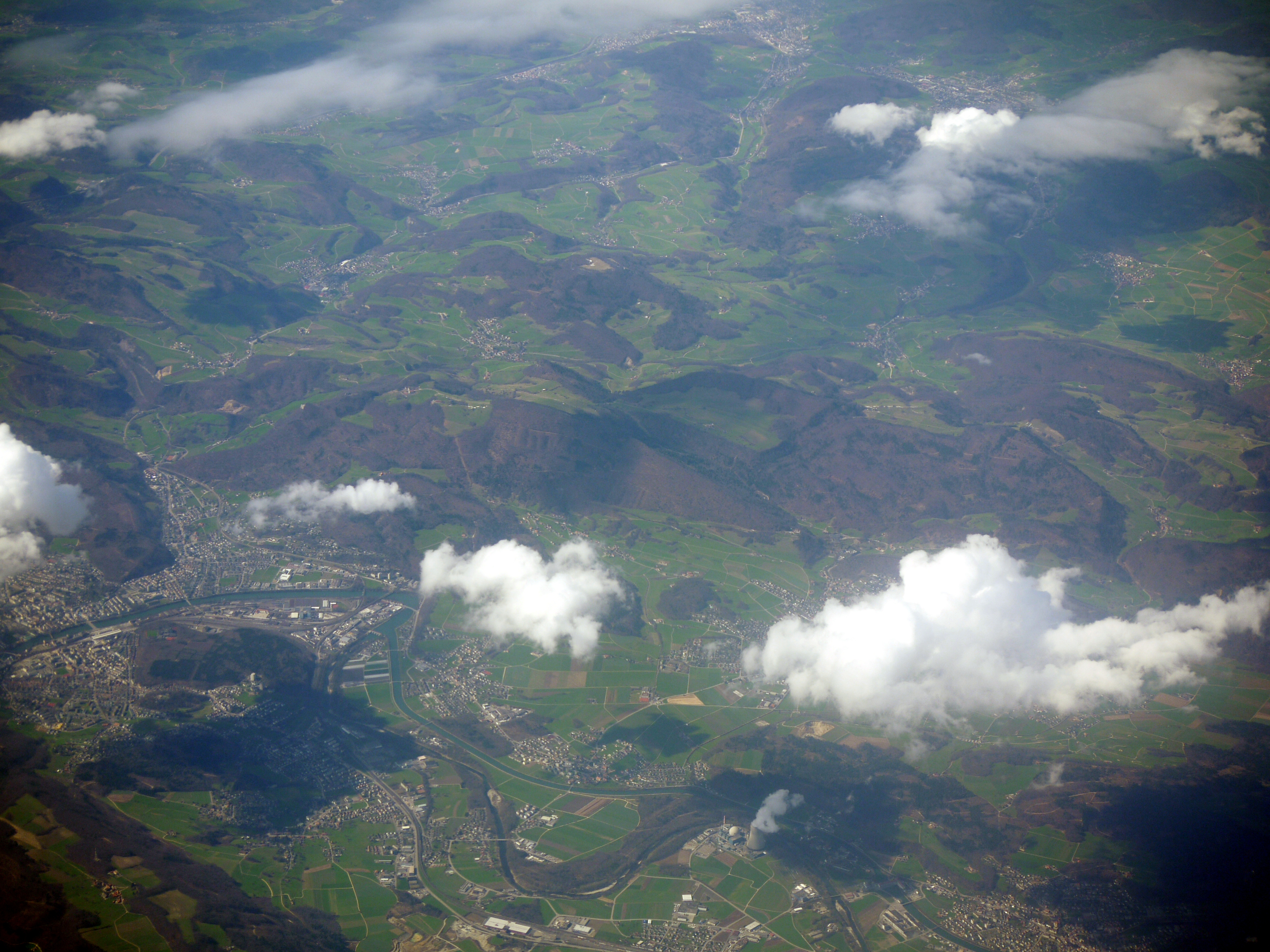
Winznau and surrounding areas from the air

Aerial view (1970)

Winznau has an area, as of 2009, of 3.94 square kilometers (1.52 sq mi). Of this area, 1.43 km^{2} (0.55 sq mi) or 36.3% is used for agricultural purposes, while 1.58 km^{2} (0.61 sq mi) or 40.1% is forested. Of the rest of the land, 0.78 km^{2} (0.30 sq mi) or 19.8% is settled (buildings or roads), 0.16 km^{2} (0.062 sq mi) or 4.1% is either rivers or lakes.

Of the built up area, industrial buildings made up 2.8% of the total area while housing and buildings made up 9.4% and transportation infrastructure made up 5.6%. Out of the forested land, 38.1% of the total land area is heavily forested and 2.0% is covered with orchards or small clusters of trees. Of the agricultural land, 20.8% is used for growing crops and 13.5% is pastures and 1.5% is used for alpine pastures. All the water in the municipality is flowing water.

== Coat of arms ==
The blazon of the municipal coat of arms is Or a Vine Branch with five Leaves and two Vine-shoots Vert.

== Demographics ==
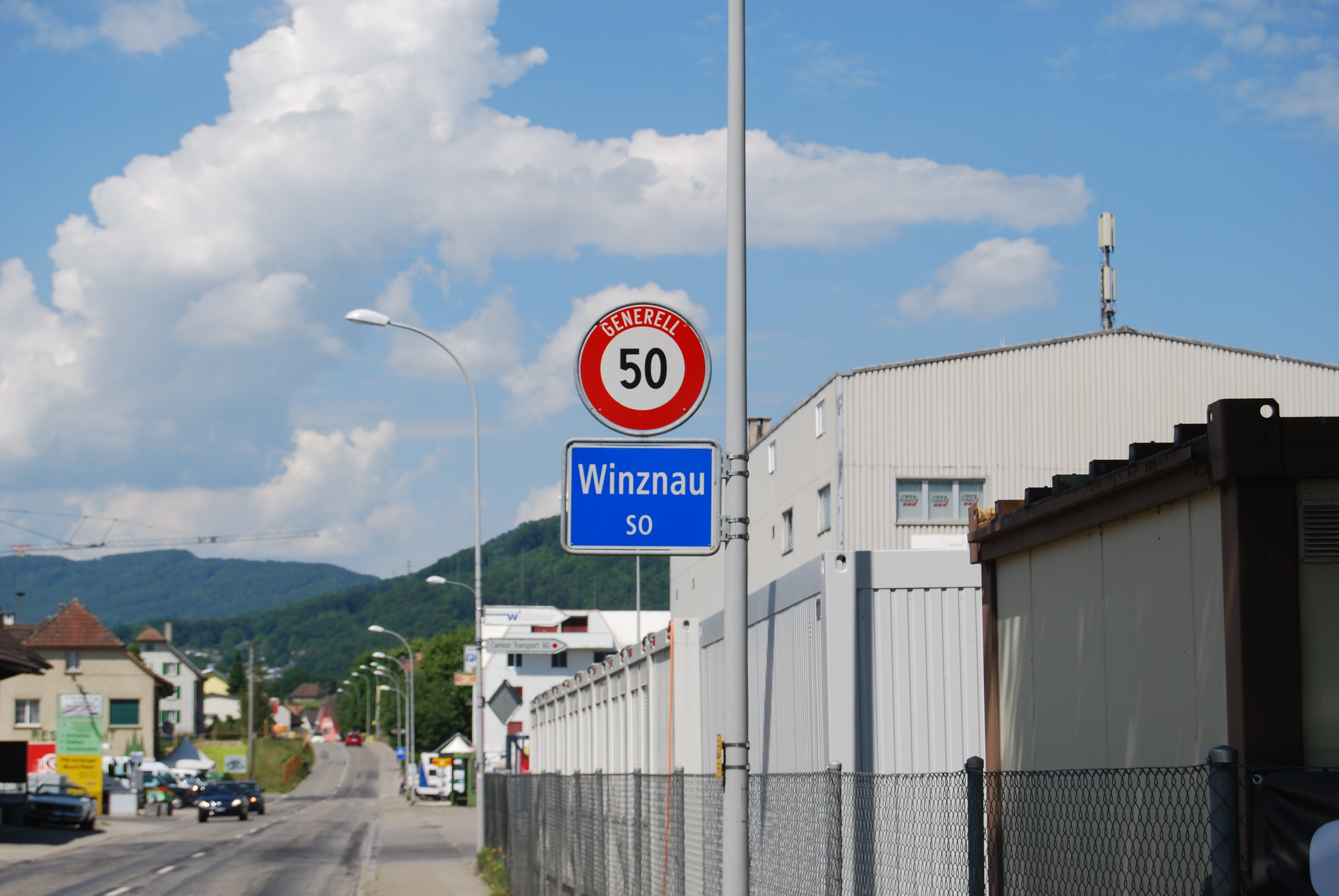
Winznau

Winznau has a population (as of December 2020) of 1,968. As of 2008, 11.6% of the population are resident foreign nationals. Over the last 10 years (1999–2009) the population has changed at a rate of -4.3%.

Most of the population (as of 2000) speaks German (1,594 or 93.8%), with Albanian being second most common (27 or 1.6%) and Italian being third (25 or 1.5%). There are 10 people who speak French and 1 person who speaks Romansh.

As of 2008, the gender distribution of the population was 50.0% male and 50.0% female. The population was made up of 708 Swiss men (42.3% of the population) and 128 (7.7%) non-Swiss men. There were 742 Swiss women (44.4%) and 95 (5.7%) non-Swiss women. Of the population in the municipality 473 or about 27.8% were born in Winznau and lived there in 2000. There were 506 or 29.8% who were born in the same canton, while 466 or 27.4% were born somewhere else in Switzerland, and 201 or 11.8% were born outside of Switzerland.

In 2008 there were 7 live births to Swiss citizens and 4 births to non-Swiss citizens, and in same time span there were 15 deaths of Swiss citizens. Ignoring immigration and emigration, the population of Swiss citizens decreased by 8 while the foreign population increased by 4. There were 3 Swiss men and 4 Swiss women who immigrated back to Switzerland. At the same time, there were 7 non-Swiss men and 4 non-Swiss women who immigrated from another country to Switzerland. The total Swiss population change in 2008 (from all sources, including moves across municipal borders) was an increase of 4 and the non-Swiss population increased by 18 people. This represents a population growth rate of 1.4%.

The age distribution, as of 2000, in Winznau is; 140 children or 8.2% of the population are between 0 and 6 years old and 247 teenagers or 14.5% are between 7 and 19. Of the adult population, 101 people or 5.9% of the population are between 20 and 24 years old. 504 people or 29.6% are between 25 and 44, and 461 people or 27.1% are between 45 and 64. The senior population distribution is 195 people or 11.5% of the population are between 65 and 79 years old and there are 52 people or 3.1% who are over 80.

As of 2000, there were 680 people who were single and never married in the municipality. There were 847 married individuals, 88 widows or widowers and 85 individuals who are divorced.

As of 2000, there were 714 private households in the municipality, and an average of 2.4 persons per household. There were 213 households that consist of only one person and 44 households with five or more people. Out of a total of 723 households that answered this question, 29.5% were households made up of just one person and there were 8 adults who lived with their parents. Of the rest of the households, there are 225 married couples without children, 230 married couples with children There were 30 single parents with a child or children. There were 8 households that were made up of unrelated people and 9 households that were made up of some sort of institution or another collective housing.

In 2000 there were 341 single family homes (or 75.9% of the total) out of a total of 449 inhabited buildings. There were 70 multi-family buildings (15.6%), along with 25 multi-purpose buildings that were mostly used for housing (5.6%) and 13 other use buildings (commercial or industrial) that also had some housing (2.9%). Of the single family homes 21 were built before 1919, while 33 were built between 1990 and 2000. The greatest number of single family homes (87) were built between 1981 and 1990.

In 2000 there were 763 apartments in the municipality. The most common apartment size was 4 rooms of which there were 205. There were 8 single room apartments and 302 apartments with five or more rooms. Of these apartments, a total of 694 apartments (91.0% of the total) were permanently occupied, while 17 apartments (2.2%) were seasonally occupied and 52 apartments (6.8%) were empty. As of 2009, the construction rate of new housing units was 1.8 new units per 1000 residents. The vacancy rate for the municipality, in 2010, was 1.52%.

The historical population is given in the following chart:

== Heritage sites of national significance ==
The Käsloch, a Paleolithic cave, is listed as a Swiss heritage site of national significance.

== Politics ==
In the 2007 federal election the most popular party was the SVP which received 28.84% of the vote. The next three most popular parties were the CVP (26.59%), the SP (19.81%) and the FDP (14.9%). In the federal election, a total of 607 votes were cast, and the voter turnout was 50.5%.

== Economy ==
As of 2010, Winznau had an unemployment rate of 3.3%. As of 2008, there were 35 people employed in the primary economic sector and about 12 businesses involved in this sector. 46 people were employed in the secondary sector and there were 11 businesses in this sector. 93 people were employed in the tertiary sector, with 32 businesses in this sector. There were 905 residents of the municipality who were employed in some capacity, of which females made up 41.8% of the workforce.

In 2008 the total number of full-time equivalent jobs was 138. The number of jobs in the primary sector was 24, all of which were in agriculture. The number of jobs in the secondary sector was 44 of which 34 or (77.3%) were in manufacturing and 10 (22.7%) were in construction. The number of jobs in the tertiary sector was 70. In the tertiary sector; 23 or 32.9% were in wholesale or retail sales or the repair of motor vehicles, 10 or 14.3% were in the movement and storage of goods, 8 or 11.4% were in a hotel or restaurant, 1 was in the information industry, 3 or 4.3% were the insurance or financial industry, 2 or 2.9% were technical professionals or scientists, 8 or 11.4% were in education and 5 or 7.1% were in health care.

In 2000, there were 192 workers who commuted into the municipality and 771 workers who commuted away. The municipality is a net exporter of workers, with about 4.0 workers leaving the municipality for every one entering. Of the working population, 18.1% used public transportation to get to work, and 63.2% used a private car.

== Religion ==
From the 2000 census, 880 or 51.8% were Roman Catholic, while 413 or 24.3% belonged to the Swiss Reformed Church. Of the rest of the population, there was 1 member of an Orthodox church who belonged, there were 17 individuals (or about 1.00% of the population) who belonged to the Christian Catholic Church, and there were 45 individuals (or about 2.65% of the population) who belonged to another Christian church. There were 5 individuals (or about 0.29% of the population) who were Jewish, and 71 (or about 4.18% of the population) who were Islamic. There were 5 individuals who were Buddhist. 241 (or about 14.18% of the population) belonged to no church, are agnostic or atheist, and 22 individuals (or about 1.29% of the population) did not answer the question.

== Education ==
In Winznau about 785 or (46.2%) of the population have completed non-mandatory upper secondary education, and 168 or (9.9%) have completed additional higher education (either university or a Fachhochschule). Of the 168 who completed tertiary schooling, 73.2% were Swiss men, 20.8% were Swiss women, 4.8% were non-Swiss men.

During the 2010-2011 school year there were a total of 134 students in the Winznau school system. The education system in the Canton of Solothurn allows young children to attend two years of non-obligatory Kindergarten. During that school year, there were 23 children in kindergarten. The canton's school system requires students to attend six years of primary school, with some of the children attending smaller, specialized classes. In the municipality there were 111 students in primary school. The secondary school program consists of three lower, obligatory years of schooling, followed by three to five years of optional, advanced schools. All the lower secondary students from Winznau attend their school in a neighboring municipality.

As of 2000, there was one student in Winznau who came from another municipality, while 105 residents attended schools outside the municipality.
