= Niedergösgen =

- Municipality
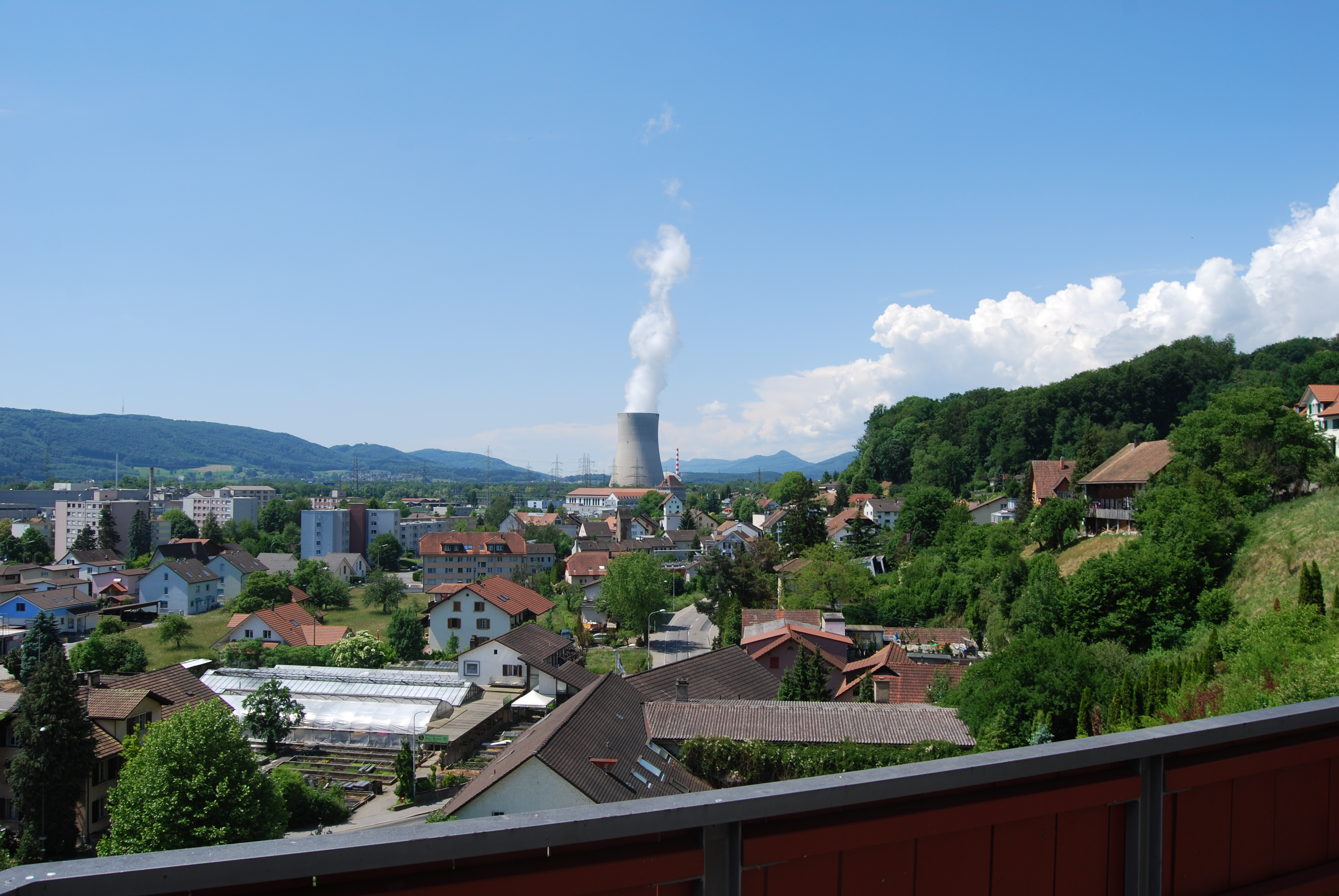

- Flag Coat of arms
- Location of Niedergösgen
- Location within Switzerland Location within Canton of Solothurn
- Coordinates: 47°22′N 8°0′E
- Country: Switzerland
- Canton: Solothurn
- District: Gösgen

Area
  - Total: 4.33 km^{2} (1.67 sq mi)
- Elevation: 377 m (1,237 ft)

Population (December 2020)
  - Total: 3,897
  - Density: 900/km^{2} (2,330/sq mi)
- Time zone: UTC+01:00 (CET)
  - Summer (DST): UTC+02:00 (CEST)
- Postal code: 5013
- SFOS number: 2495
- ISO 3166 code: CH-SO
- Surrounded by: Däniken, Gretzenbach, Lostorf, Niedererlinsbach, Obergösgen, Schönenwerd, Stüsslingen
- Website: www.niedergoesgen.ch

Niedergösgen is a municipality in the district of Gösgen in the canton of Solothurn in Switzerland.

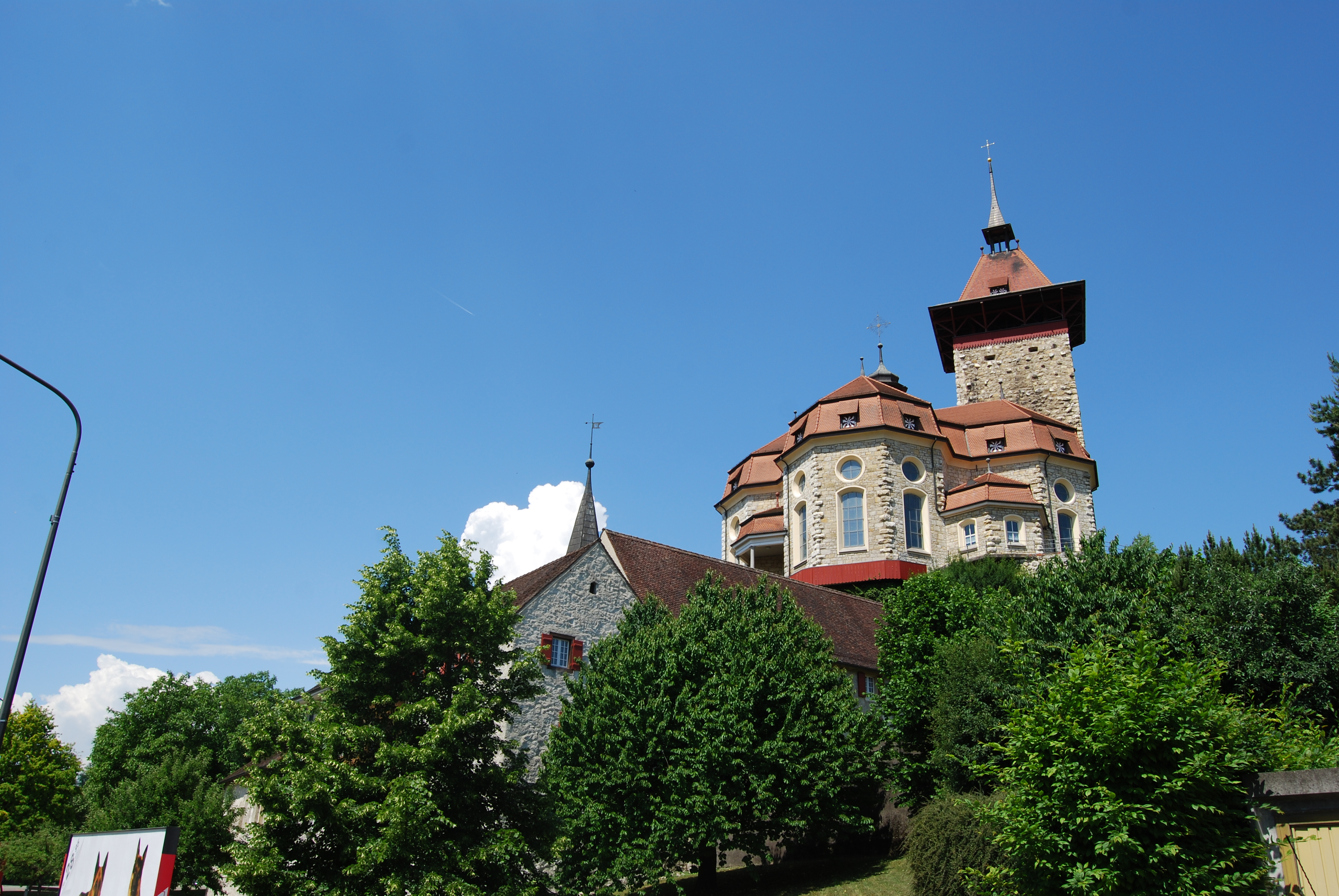
Niedergösgen

== History ==
Niedergösgen is first mentioned in 1294 as Bözzach. In 1308 it was mentioned as Göskon inferior.

== Geography ==
Aerial view (1955)

Niedergösgen has an area, as of 2009, of 4.33 square kilometers (1.67 sq mi). Of this area, 1.13 km^{2} (0.44 sq mi) or 26.1% is used for agricultural purposes, while 1.58 km^{2} (0.61 sq mi) or 36.5% is forested. Of the rest of the land, 1.32 km^{2} (0.51 sq mi) or 30.5% is settled (buildings or roads), 0.3 km^{2} (0.12 sq mi) or 6.9% is either rivers or lakes.

Of the built up area, industrial buildings made up 3.9% of the total area while housing and buildings made up 18.0% and transportation infrastructure made up 3.9%. Power and water infrastructure as well as other special developed areas made up 2.8% of the area while parks, green belts and sports fields made up 1.8%. Out of the forested land, 33.7% of the total land area is heavily forested and 2.8% is covered with orchards or small clusters of trees. Of the agricultural land, 14.1% is used for growing crops and 9.9% is pastures, while 2.1% is used for orchards or vine crops. All the water in the municipality is flowing water.

The municipality is located in the Gösgen district, along the Aare river. It consists of the village of Niedergösgen and village section of Mühledorf.

== Coat of arms ==
The blazon of the municipal coat of arms is Per bend Gules and Argent.

== Demographics ==
Niedergösgen has a population (as of December 2020) of 3,897. As of 2008, 26.5% of the population are resident foreign nationals. Over the last 10 years (1999–2009 ) the population has changed at a rate of -0.3%.

Most of the population (as of 2000) speaks German (3,217 or 85.2%), with Italian being second most common (175 or 4.6%) and Serbo-Croatian being third (128 or 3.4%). There are 21 people who speak French and 1 person who speaks Romansh.

As of 2008, the gender distribution of the population was 50.0% male and 50.0% female. The population was made up of 1,346 Swiss men (35.3% of the population) and 561 (14.7%) non-Swiss men. There were 1,434 Swiss women (37.6%) and 476 (12.5%) non-Swiss women. Of the population in the municipality 1,150 or about 30.5% were born in Niedergösgen and lived there in 2000. There were 698 or 18.5% who were born in the same canton, while 1,032 or 27.3% were born somewhere else in Switzerland, and 791 or 21.0% were born outside of Switzerland.

In 2008 there were 19 live births to Swiss citizens and 13 births to non-Swiss citizens, and in same time span there were 31 deaths of Swiss citizens and 5 non-Swiss citizen deaths. Ignoring immigration and emigration, the population of Swiss citizens decreased by 12 while the foreign population increased by 8. There were 3 Swiss men and 4 Swiss women who immigrated back to Switzerland. At the same time, there were 32 non-Swiss men and 8 non-Swiss women who immigrated from another country to Switzerland. The total Swiss population change in 2008 (from all sources, including moves across municipal borders) was a decrease of 40 and the non-Swiss population increased by 37 people. This represents a population growth rate of -0.1%.

The age distribution, as of 2000, in Niedergösgen is; 274 children or 7.3% of the population are between 0 and 6 years old and 659 teenagers or 17.5% are between 7 and 19. Of the adult population, 220 people or 5.8% of the population are between 20 and 24 years old. 1,126 people or 29.8% are between 25 and 44, and 908 people or 24.1% are between 45 and 64. The senior population distribution is 411 people or 10.9% of the population are between 65 and 79 years old and there are 177 people or 4.7% who are over 80.

As of 2000, there were 1,503 people who were single and never married in the municipality. There were 1,868 married individuals, 242 widows or widowers and 162 individuals who are divorced.

As of 2000, there were 1,497 private households in the municipality, and an average of 2.5 persons per household. There were 430 households that consist of only one person and 131 households with five or more people. Out of a total of 1,516 households that answered this question, 28.4% were households made up of just one person and there were 14 adults who lived with their parents. Of the rest of the households, there are 436 married couples without children, 527 married couples with children There were 71 single parents with a child or children. There were 19 households that were made up of unrelated people and 19 households that were made up of some sort of institution or another collective housing.

In 2000 there were 587 single family homes (or 69.1% of the total) out of a total of 850 inhabited buildings. There were 155 multi-family buildings (18.2%), along with 75 multi-purpose buildings that were mostly used for housing (8.8%) and 33 other use buildings (commercial or industrial) that also had some housing (3.9%). Of the single family homes 64 were built before 1919, while 75 were built between 1990 and 2000. The greatest number of single family homes (149) were built between 1946 and 1960.

In 2000 there were 1,617 apartments in the municipality. The most common apartment size was 4 rooms of which there were 564. There were 50 single room apartments and 562 apartments with five or more rooms. Of these apartments, a total of 1,472 apartments (91.0% of the total) were permanently occupied, while 76 apartments (4.7%) were seasonally occupied and 69 apartments (4.3%) were empty. As of 2009, the construction rate of new housing units was 0.8 new units per 1000 residents. The vacancy rate for the municipality, in 2010, was 3.67%.

The historical population is given in the following chart:

== Heritage sites of national significance ==
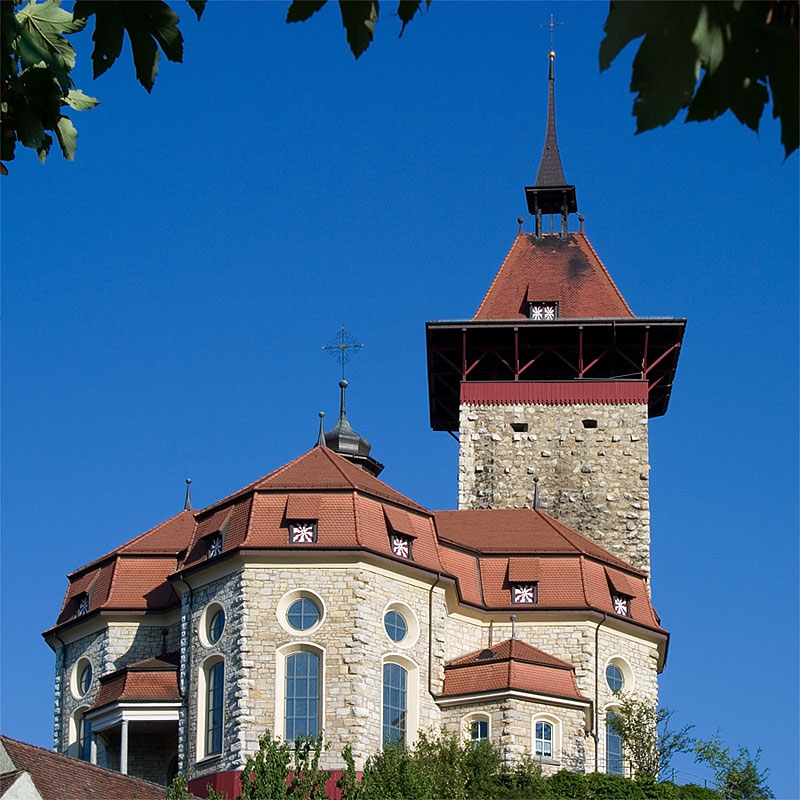
Niedergösgen Church and Tower

The Church and Tower is listed as a Swiss heritage site of national significance. The entire village of Schönenwer is part of the Inventory of Swiss Heritage Sites.

== Politics ==
In the 2007 federal election the most popular party was the SVP which received 37.47% of the vote. The next three most popular parties were the CVP (23.65%), the FDP (14.53%) and the SP (12.99%). In the federal election, a total of 1,169 votes were cast, and the voter turnout was 49.9%.

== Economy ==
As of 2010, Niedergösgen had an unemployment rate of 4%. As of 2008, there were 43 people employed in the primary economic sector and about 14 businesses involved in this sector. 493 people were employed in the secondary sector and there were 47 businesses in this sector. 498 people were employed in the tertiary sector, with 76 businesses in this sector. There were 1,961 residents of the municipality who were employed in some capacity, of which females made up 40.7% of the workforce.

In 2008 the total number of full-time equivalent jobs was 901. The number of jobs in the primary sector was 32, of which 21 were in agriculture and 11 were in forestry or lumber production. The number of jobs in the secondary sector was 467 of which 280 or (60.0%) were in manufacturing and 117 (25.1%) were in construction. The number of jobs in the tertiary sector was 402. In the tertiary sector; 103 or 25.6% were in wholesale or retail sales or the repair of motor vehicles, 22 or 5.5% were in the movement and storage of goods, 42 or 10.4% were in a hotel or restaurant, 29 or 7.2% were in the information industry, 22 or 5.5% were the insurance or financial industry, 18 or 4.5% were technical professionals or scientists, 31 or 7.7% were in education and 79 or 19.7% were in health care.

In 2000, there were 533 workers who commuted into the municipality and 1,483 workers who commuted away. The municipality is a net exporter of workers, with about 2.8 workers leaving the municipality for every one entering. Of the working population, 17.3% used public transportation to get to work, and 57% used a private car.

== Religion ==
From the 2000 census, 1,763 or 46.7% were Roman Catholic, while 901 or 23.9% belonged to the Swiss Reformed Church. Of the rest of the population, there were 105 members of an Orthodox church (or about 2.78% of the population), there were 54 individuals (or about 1.43% of the population) who belonged to the Christian Catholic Church, and there were 58 individuals (or about 1.54% of the population) who belonged to another Christian church. There was 1 individual who was Jewish, and 285 (or about 7.55% of the population) who were Islamic. There were 8 individuals who were Buddhist, 19 individuals who were Hindu and 2 individuals who belonged to another church. 463 (or about 12.26% of the population) belonged to no church, are agnostic or atheist, and 116 individuals (or about 3.07% of the population) did not answer the question.

== Education ==
In Niedergösgen about 1,421 or (37.6%) of the population have completed non-mandatory upper secondary education, and 319 or (8.5%) have completed additional higher education (either university or a Fachhochschule). Of the 319 who completed tertiary schooling, 70.2% were Swiss men, 19.7% were Swiss women, 7.2% were non-Swiss men and 2.8% were non-Swiss women.

During the 2010-2011 school year there were a total of 351 students in the Niedergösgen school system. The education system in the Canton of Solothurn allows young children to attend two years of non-obligatory Kindergarten. During that school year, there were 62 children in kindergarten. The canton's school system requires students to attend six years of primary school, with some of the children attending smaller, specialized classes. In the municipality there were 217 students in primary school and 7 students in the special, smaller classes. The secondary school program consists of three lower, obligatory years of schooling, followed by three to five years of optional, advanced schools. 65 lower secondary students attend school in Niedergösgen.

As of 2000, there were 12 students in Niedergösgen who came from another municipality, while 171 residents attended schools outside the municipality.
