= Lostorf =

- Municipality
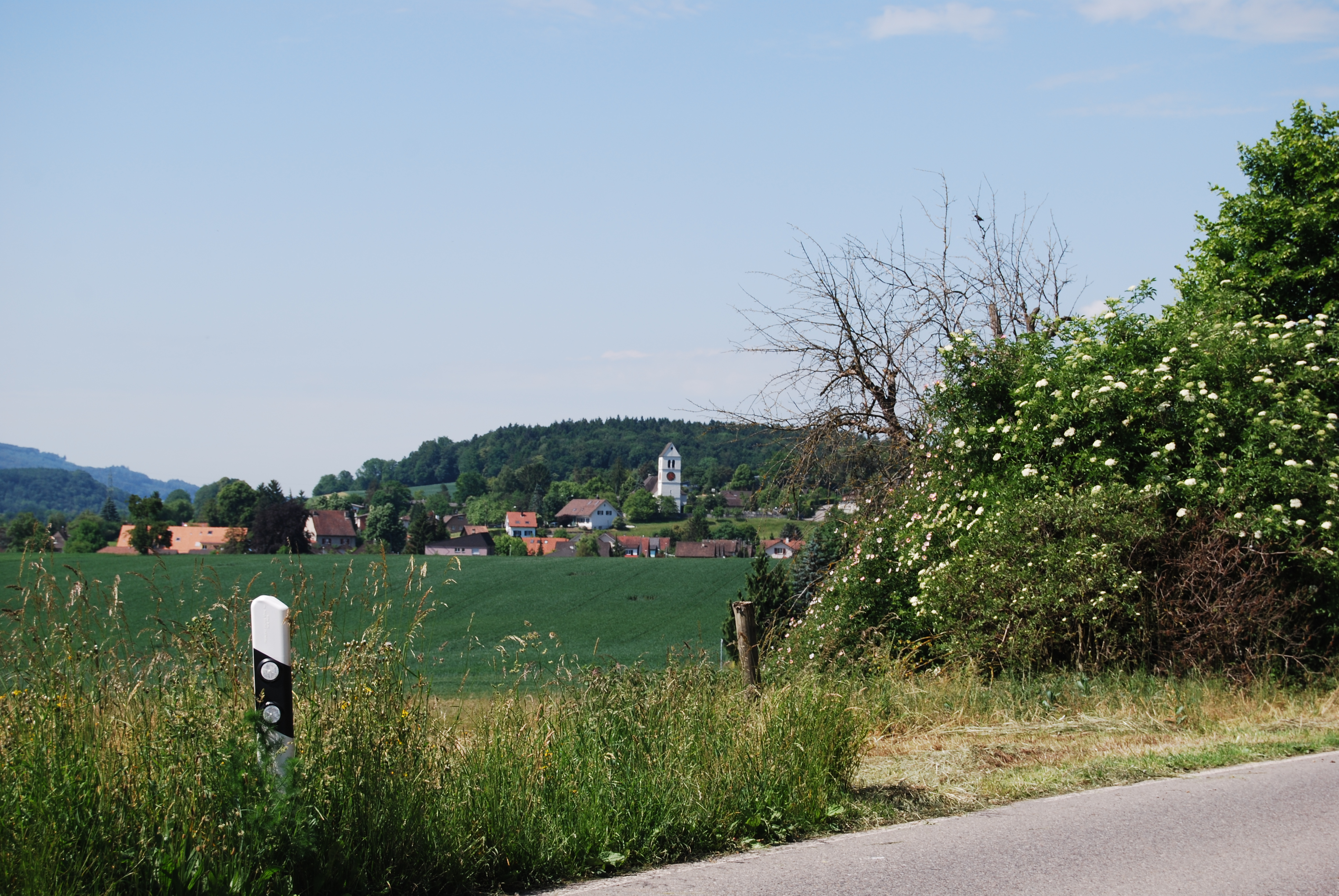
- Lostorf village

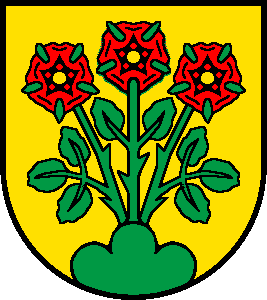
- Coat of arms
- Location of Lostorf
- Location within Switzerland Location within Canton of Solothurn
- Coordinates: 47°23′N 7°57′E
- Country: Switzerland
- Canton: Solothurn
- District: Gösgen

Area
  - Total: 13.26 km^{2} (5.12 sq mi)
- Elevation: 451 m (1,480 ft)

Population (December 2020)
  - Total: 3,963
  - Density: 298.9/km^{2} (774.1/sq mi)
- Time zone: UTC+01:00 (CET)
  - Summer (DST): UTC+02:00 (CEST)
- Postal code: 4654
- SFOS number: 2493
- ISO 3166 code: CH-SO
- Surrounded by: Niedergösgen, Obergösgen, Rohr, Stüsslingen, Trimbach, Winznau, Wisen, Zeglingen (BL)
- Twin towns: Rielasingen (Germany)
- Website: www.lostorf.ch

Lostorf is a municipality in the district of Gösgen in the canton of Solothurn in Switzerland.

== History ==
Lostorf is first mentioned around 1145-53 as de Loztorf.

== Geography ==
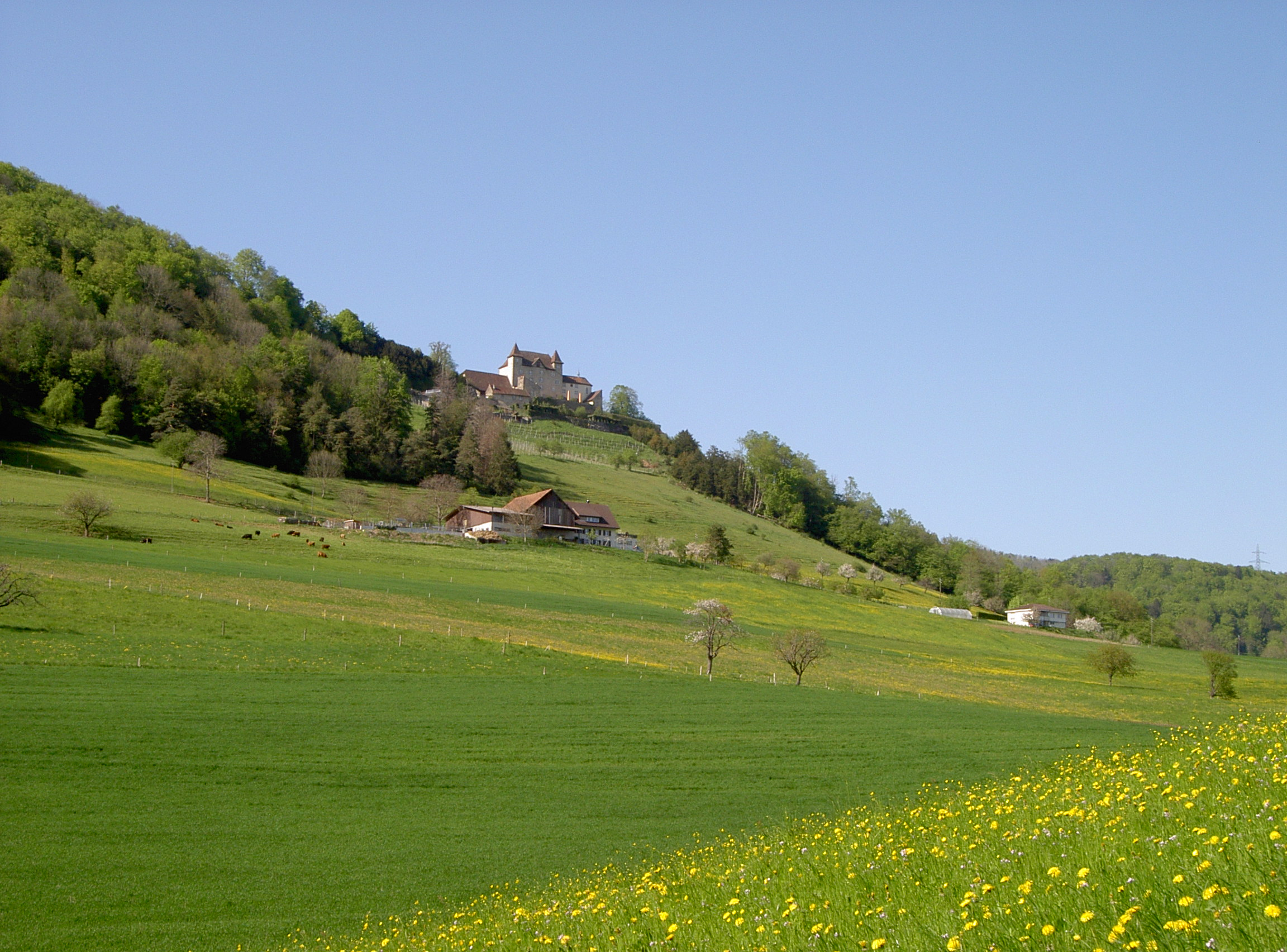
Hillside and Wartenfels Castle near Lostorf

Aerial view (1953)

Lostorf has an area, as of 2009, of 13.26 square kilometers (5.12 sq mi). Of this area, 5 km^{2} (1.9 sq mi) or 37.7% is used for agricultural purposes, while 6.47 km^{2} (2.50 sq mi) or 48.8% is forested. Of the rest of the land, 1.83 km^{2} (0.71 sq mi) or 13.8% is settled (buildings or roads) and 0.01 km^{2} (2.5 acres) or 0.1% is unproductive land.

Of the built up area, housing and buildings made up 8.4% and transportation infrastructure made up 2.7%. while parks, green belts and sports fields made up 1.4%. Out of the forested land, 47.2% of the total land area is heavily forested and 1.6% is covered with orchards or small clusters of trees. Of the agricultural land, 15.2% is used for growing crops and 17.7% is pastures and 4.1% is used for alpine pastures.

The municipality is located in the Gösgen district, near the base of Dottenberg and Reitifluh Mountains. It consists of the village of Lostorf and the hamlets of Mahren and Bad Lostorf.

== Coat of arms ==
The blazon of the municipal coat of arms is Or three Roses Gules barbed and seeded proper, slipped and leaved Vert issuant from a Mount of 3 Coupeaux of the last.

== Demographics ==
Lostorf has a population (as of December 2020) of 3,963. As of 2008, 8.5% of the population are resident foreign nationals. Over the last 10 years (1999–2009 ) the population has changed at a rate of 10.2%.

Most of the population (as of 2000) speaks German (3,289 or 94.6%), with Italian being second most common (42 or 1.2%) and Serbo-Croatian being third (22 or 0.6%). There are 12 people who speak French and 3 people who speak Romansh.

As of 2008, the gender distribution of the population was 49.8% male and 50.2% female. The population was made up of 1,690 Swiss men (44.3% of the population) and 211 (5.5%) non-Swiss men. There were 1,758 Swiss women (46.1%) and 155 (4.1%) non-Swiss women. Of the population in the municipality 990 or about 28.5% were born in Lostorf and lived there in 2000. There were 974 or 28.0% who were born in the same canton, while 1,089 or 31.3% were born somewhere else in Switzerland, and 346 or 10.0% were born outside of Switzerland.

In 2008 there were 19 live births to Swiss citizens and 3 births to non-Swiss citizens, and in same time span there were 32 deaths of Swiss citizens. Ignoring immigration and emigration, the population of Swiss citizens decreased by 13 while the foreign population increased by 3. There were 7 Swiss men and 2 Swiss women who immigrated back to Switzerland. At the same time, there were 20 non-Swiss men and 2 non-Swiss women who immigrated from another country to Switzerland. The total Swiss population change in 2008 (from all sources, including moves across municipal borders) was an increase of 46 and the non-Swiss population increased by 16 people. This represents a population growth rate of 1.7%.

The age distribution, as of 2000, in Lostorf is; 298 children or 8.6% of the population are between 0 and 6 years old and 596 teenagers or 17.1% are between 7 and 19. Of the adult population, 157 people or 4.5% of the population are between 20 and 24 years old. 1,039 people or 29.9% are between 25 and 44, and 937 people or 26.9% are between 45 and 64. The senior population distribution is 355 people or 10.2% of the population are between 65 and 79 years old and there are 95 people or 2.7% who are over 80.

As of 2000, there were 1,373 people who were single and never married in the municipality. There were 1,835 married individuals, 138 widows or widowers and 131 individuals who are divorced.

As of 2000, there were 1,339 private households in the municipality, and an average of 2.6 persons per household. There were 286 households that consist of only one person and 102 households with five or more people. Out of a total of 1,356 households that answered this question, 21.1% were households made up of just one person and there were 6 adults who lived with their parents. Of the rest of the households, there are 471 married couples without children, 501 married couples with children There were 53 single parents with a child or children. There were 22 households that were made up of unrelated people and 17 households that were made up of some sort of institution or another collective housing.

In 2000 there were 796 single-family homes (or 76.7% of the total) out of a total of 1,038 inhabited buildings. There were 118 multi-family buildings (11.4%), along with 88 multi-purpose buildings that were mostly used for housing (8.5%) and 36 other use buildings (commercial or industrial) that also had some housing (3.5%). Of the single-family homes 55 were built before 1919, while 148 were built between 1990 and 2000. The greatest number of single-family homes (177) were built between 1981 and 1990.

In 2000 there were 1,472 apartments in the municipality. The most common apartment size was 5 rooms of which there were 404. There were 70 single-room apartments and 713 apartments with five or more rooms. Of these apartments, a total of 1,310 apartments (89.0% of the total) were permanently occupied, while 108 apartments (7.3%) were seasonally occupied and 54 apartments (3.7%) were empty. As of 2009, the construction rate of new housing units was 4.8 new units per 1000 residents. The vacancy rate for the municipality, in 2010, was 0.78%.

The historical population is given in the following chart:

== Politics ==
In the 2007 federal election the most popular party was the SVP which received 28.96% of the vote. The next three most popular parties were the FDP (24.5%), the SP (19.56%) and the CVP (17.48%). In the federal election, a total of 1,533 votes were cast, and the voter turnout was 57.6%.

== Economy ==
As of 2010, Lostorf had an unemployment rate of 1.8%. As of 2008, there were 93 people employed in the primary economic sector and about 27 businesses involved in this sector. 179 people were employed in the secondary sector and there were 32 businesses in this sector. 526 people were employed in the tertiary sector, with 96 businesses in this sector. There were 1,849 residents of the municipality who were employed in some capacity, of which females made up 42.1% of the workforce.

In 2008 the total number of full-time equivalent jobs was 603. The number of jobs in the primary sector was 48, all of which were in agriculture. The number of jobs in the secondary sector was 163 of which 112 or (68.7%) were in manufacturing and 50 (30.7%) were in construction. The number of jobs in the tertiary sector was 392. In the tertiary sector; 113 or 28.8% were in wholesale or retail sales or the repair of motor vehicles, 36 or 9.2% were in the movement and storage of goods, 13 or 3.3% were in a hotel or restaurant, 3 or 0.8% were in the information industry, 10 or 2.6% were the insurance or financial industry, 69 or 17.6% were technical professionals or scientists, 43 or 11.0% were in education and 58 or 14.8% were in health care.

In 2000, there were 340 workers who commuted into the municipality and 1,378 workers who commuted away. The municipality is a net exporter of workers, with about 4.1 workers leaving the municipality for every one entering. Of the working population, 14.2% used public transportation to get to work, and 64.7% used a private car.

== Religion ==
From the 2000 census, 1,577 or 45.4% were Roman Catholic, while 1,081 or 31.1% belonged to the Swiss Reformed Church. Of the rest of the population, there were 26 members of an Orthodox church (or about 0.75% of the population), there were 33 individuals (or about 0.95% of the population) who belonged to the Christian Catholic Church, and there were 87 individuals (or about 2.50% of the population) who belonged to another Christian church. There were 2 individuals (or about 0.06% of the population) who were Jewish, and 58 (or about 1.67% of the population) who were Islamic. There were 12 individuals who were Buddhist and 2 individuals who belonged to another church. 518 (or about 14.90% of the population) belonged to no church, are agnostic or atheist, and 81 individuals (or about 2.33% of the population) did not answer the question.

== Education ==
In Lostorf about 1,480 or (42.6%) of the population have completed non-mandatory upper secondary education, and 503 or (14.5%) have completed additional higher education (either university or a Fachhochschule). Of the 503 who completed tertiary schooling, 72.0% were Swiss men, 20.1% were Swiss women, 6.8% were non-Swiss men and 1.2% were non-Swiss women.

During the 2010–2011 school year there were a total of 348 students in the Lostorf school system. The education system in the Canton of Solothurn allows young children to attend two years of non-obligatory Kindergarten. During that school year, there were 79 children in kindergarten. The canton's school system requires students to attend six years of primary school, with some of the children attending smaller, specialized classes. In the municipality there were 262 students in primary school and 7 students in the special, smaller classes. The secondary school program consists of three lower, obligatory years of schooling, followed by three to five years of optional, advanced schools. All the lower secondary students from Lostorf attend their school in a neighboring municipality.

As of 2000, there were 57 students in Lostorf who came from another municipality, while 254 residents attended schools outside the municipality.

- Paul Sahli, juggler
