= Gösgen District =

District in the canton of Solothurn, Switzerland

Coordinates: 47°22′25″N 7°59′35″E

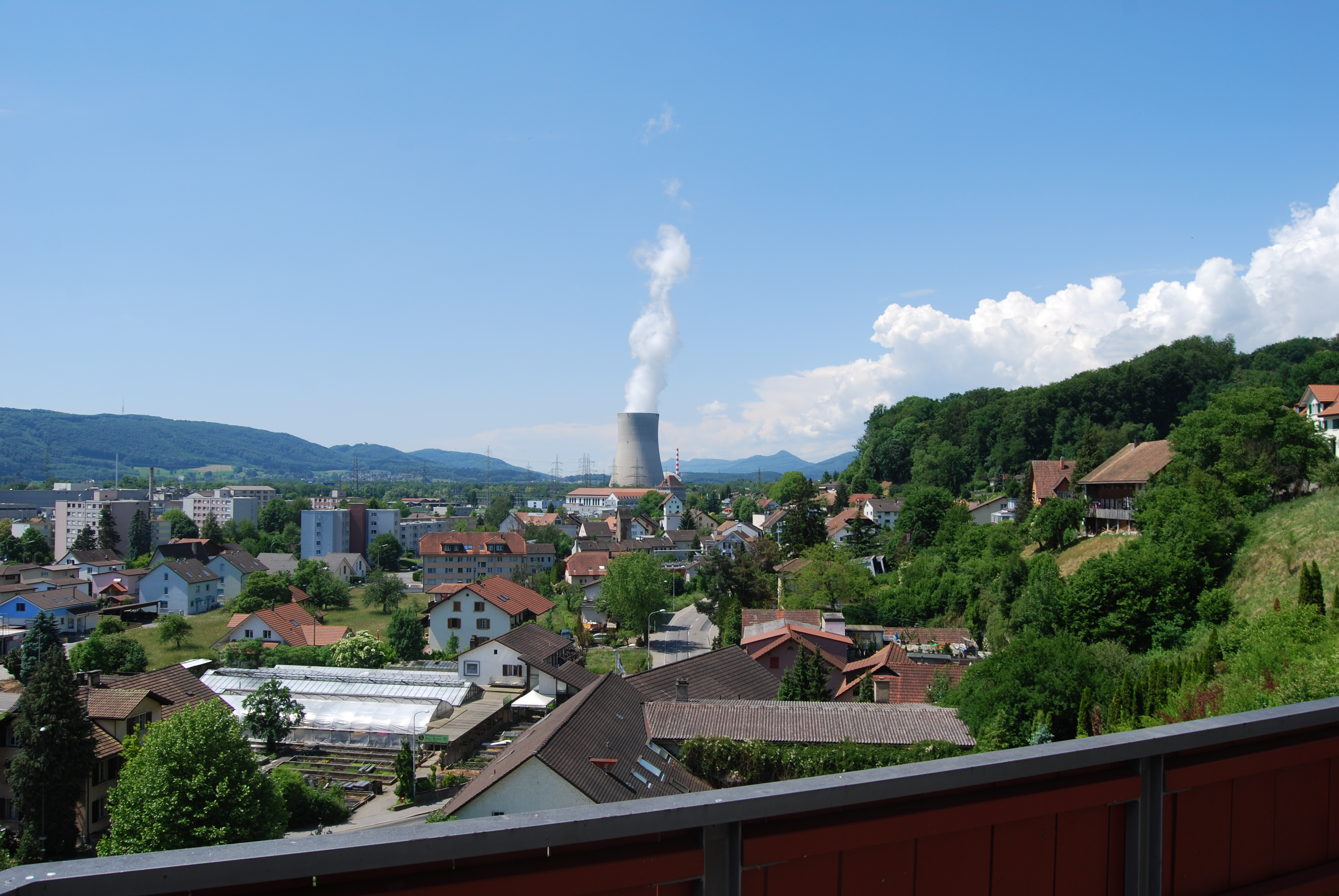
Niedergösgen and the Gösgen Nuclear Power Plant

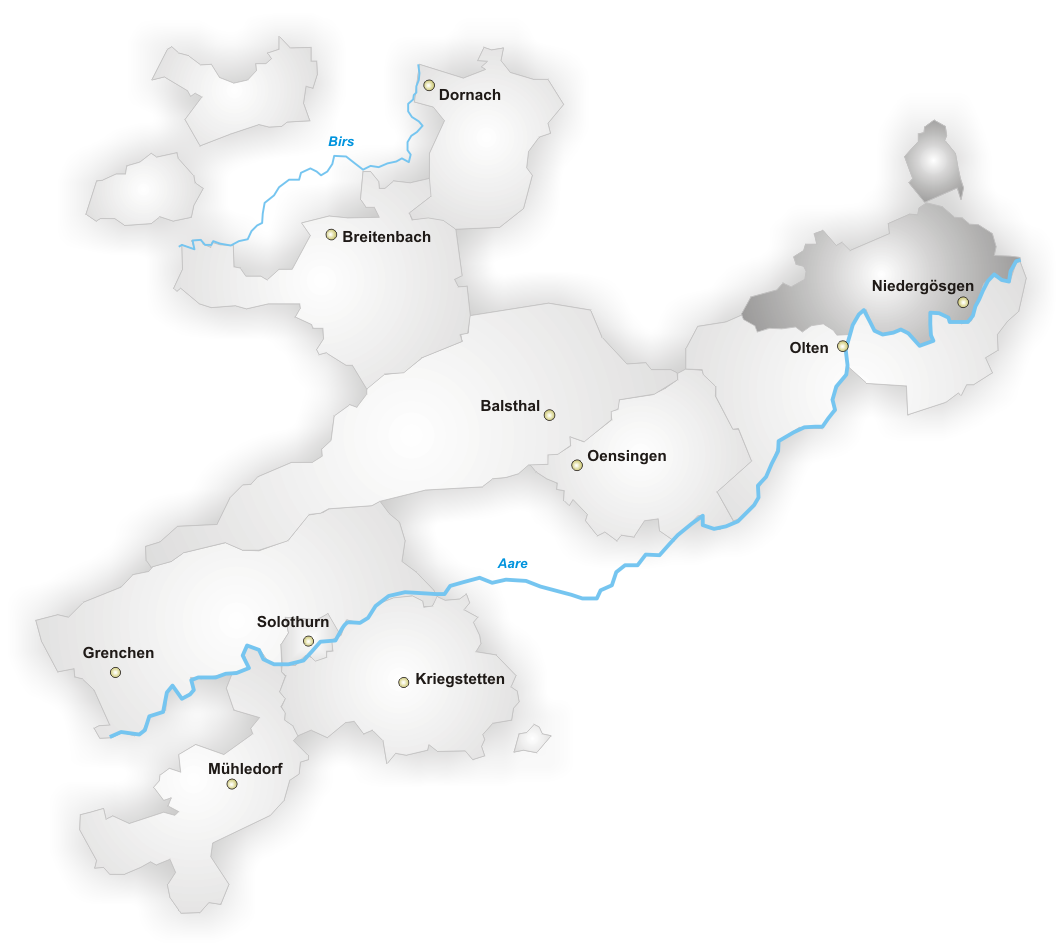
Gösgen District, canton of Solothurn

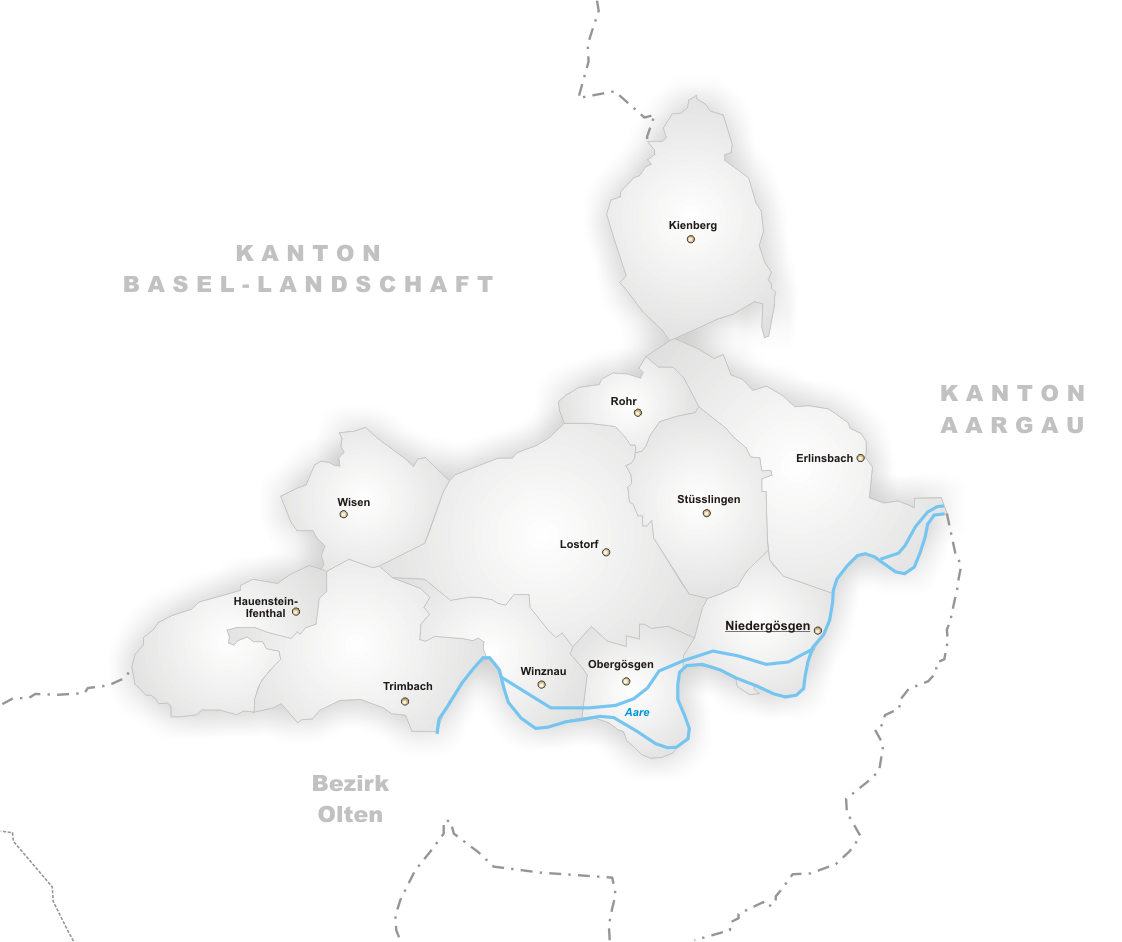
Municipalities of Gösgen District

Gösgen District is one of the ten districts of the canton of Solothurn, Switzerland, situated to the northeast of the canton. Together with the Olten District, Gösgen forms the electoral district of Olten-Gösgen. It has a population of 24,793 (as of 31 December 2020).

== Municipalities ==
Gösgen District contains the following municipalities:

Coat of arms	Municipality	Population (31 December 2020)	Area, km^{2}
Erlinsbach	Erlinsbach	3,572	8.90
Hauenstein-Ifenthal	Hauenstein-Ifenthal	306	5.30
Kienberg	Kienberg	503	8.53
Lostorf	Lostorf	3,963	13.27
Niedergösgen	Niedergösgen	3,897	4.33
Obergösgen	Obergösgen	2,359	3.63
Stüsslingen	Stüsslingen	1,129	8.40
Trimbach	Trimbach	6,562	7.66
Winznau	Winznau	1,968	4.00
Wisen	Wisen	442	4.79
	Total	24,793	68.81

== Mergers and name changes ==
- On 1 January 2006 the former municipalities of Obererlinsbach and Niedererlinsbach merged to form the new municipality of Erlinsbach.
- On 1 January 2021 the former municipality of Rohr merged into Stüsslingen.

== Geography ==
Gösgen has an area, as of 2009, of 68.8 square kilometers (26.6 sq mi). Of this area, 28.22 km^{2} (10.90 sq mi) or 41.0% is used for agricultural purposes, while 29.56 km^{2} (11.41 sq mi) or 43.0% is forested. Of the rest of the land, 9.84 km^{2} (3.80 sq mi) or 14.3% is settled (buildings or roads), 1.1 km^{2} (0.42 sq mi) or 1.6% is either rivers or lakes and 0.08 km^{2} (20 acres) or 0.1% is unproductive land.

Of the built up area, housing and buildings made up 7.7% and transportation infrastructure made up 3.4%. while parks, green belts and sports fields made up 1.3%. Out of the forested land, 40.6% of the total land area is heavily forested and 2.3% is covered with orchards or small clusters of trees. Of the agricultural land, 37.2% is used for growing crops, while 2.0% is used for orchards or vine crops and 1.8% is used for alpine pastures. All the water in the district is flowing water.

== Coat of arms ==
Coat of Arms

The blazon of the municipal coat of arms is Per bend sinister Gules and Argent.

== Demographics ==
Gösgen has a population (as of December 2020) of 24,793.

Most of the population (as of 2000) speaks German (19,540 or 88.0%), with Italian being second most common (798 or 3.6%) and Serbo-Croatian being third (390 or 1.8%). There are 130 people who speak French and 24 people who speak Romansh.

As of 2008, the gender distribution of the population was 49.6% male and 50.4% female. The population was made up of 8,779 Swiss men (38.0% of the population) and 2,677 (11.6%) non-Swiss men. There were 9,378 Swiss women (40.6%) and 2,275 (9.8%) non-Swiss women. Of the population in the district, 6,589 (29.7%) were born in Gösgen and lived there in 2000. There were 4,719 (21.2%) who were born in the same canton, while 6,614 or 29.8% were born somewhere else in Switzerland, and 3,703 (16.7%) were born outside of Switzerland.

In 2008 there were 122 live births to Swiss citizens and 54 births to non-Swiss citizens, and in same time span there were 170 deaths of Swiss citizens and 17 non-Swiss citizen deaths. Ignoring immigration and emigration, the population of Swiss citizens decreased by 48 while the foreign population increased by 37. There were 33 Swiss men and 21 Swiss women who immigrated back to Switzerland. At the same time, there were 103 non-Swiss men and 48 non-Swiss women who immigrated from another country to Switzerland. The total Swiss population change in 2008 (including moves across municipal borders) was an increase of 103 and the non-Swiss population increased by 139 people. This represents a population growth rate of 1.1%.

As of 2000, there were 8,914 people who were single and never married in the district. There were 11,018 married individuals, 1,281 widows or widowers and 998 individuals who are divorced.

There were 2,686 households that consist of only one person and 676 households with five or more people. Out of a total of 9,196 households that answered this question, 29.2% were households made up of just one person and 81 were adults who lived with their parents. Of the rest of the households, there are 2,733 married couples without children, 3,008 married couples with children There were 438 single parents with a child or children. There were 118 households that were made up unrelated people and 132 households that were made some sort of institution or another collective housing.

The historical population is given in the following chart:

== Politics ==
In the 2007 federal election, the most popular party was the SVP, which received 30.41% of the vote. The next three most popular parties were the CVP (19.78%), the SP (19.43%) and the FDP (18.24%). In the federal election, a total of 7,630 votes were cast, and the voter turnout was 51.6%.

== Religion ==
From the 2000 census, 10,244 or 46.1% were Roman Catholic, while 5,991 or 27.0% belonged to the Swiss Reformed Church. Of the rest of the population, there were 351 members of an Orthodox church (or about 1.58% of the population), there were 264 individuals (or about 1.19% of the population) who belonged to the Christian Catholic Church, and there were 445 individuals (or about 2.00% of the population) who belonged to another Christian church. There were 15 individuals (or about 0.07% of the population) who were Jewish, and 1,304 (or about 5.87% of the population) who were Islamic. There were 70 individuals who were Buddhist, 85 individuals who were Hindu and 17 individuals who belonged to another church. 2,835 (or about 12.76% of the population) belonged to no church, are agnostic or atheist, and 590 individuals (or about 2.66% of the population) did not answer the question.

== Weather ==
Gösgen has an average of 127.9 days of rain or snow per year and on average receives 930 mm (37 in) of precipitation. The wettest month is June during which time Gösgen receives an average of 108 mm (4.3 in) of rain or snow. During this month, there is precipitation for an average of 12.4 days. The month with the most days of precipitation is May, with an average of 12.6, but with only 87 mm (3.4 in) of rain or snow. The driest month of the year is October with an average of 60 mm (2.4 in) of precipitation over 8.1 days.

== Education ==
In Gösgen, about 8,667 or (39.0%) of the population have completed non-mandatory upper secondary education, and 2,238 or (10.1%) have completed additional higher education (either University or a Fachhochschule). Of the 2,238 who completed tertiary schooling, 68.3% were Swiss men, 20.1% were Swiss women, 7.9% were non-Swiss men and 3.8% were non-Swiss women.
