= Erlinsbach, Solothurn =

Erlinsbach
- Municipality
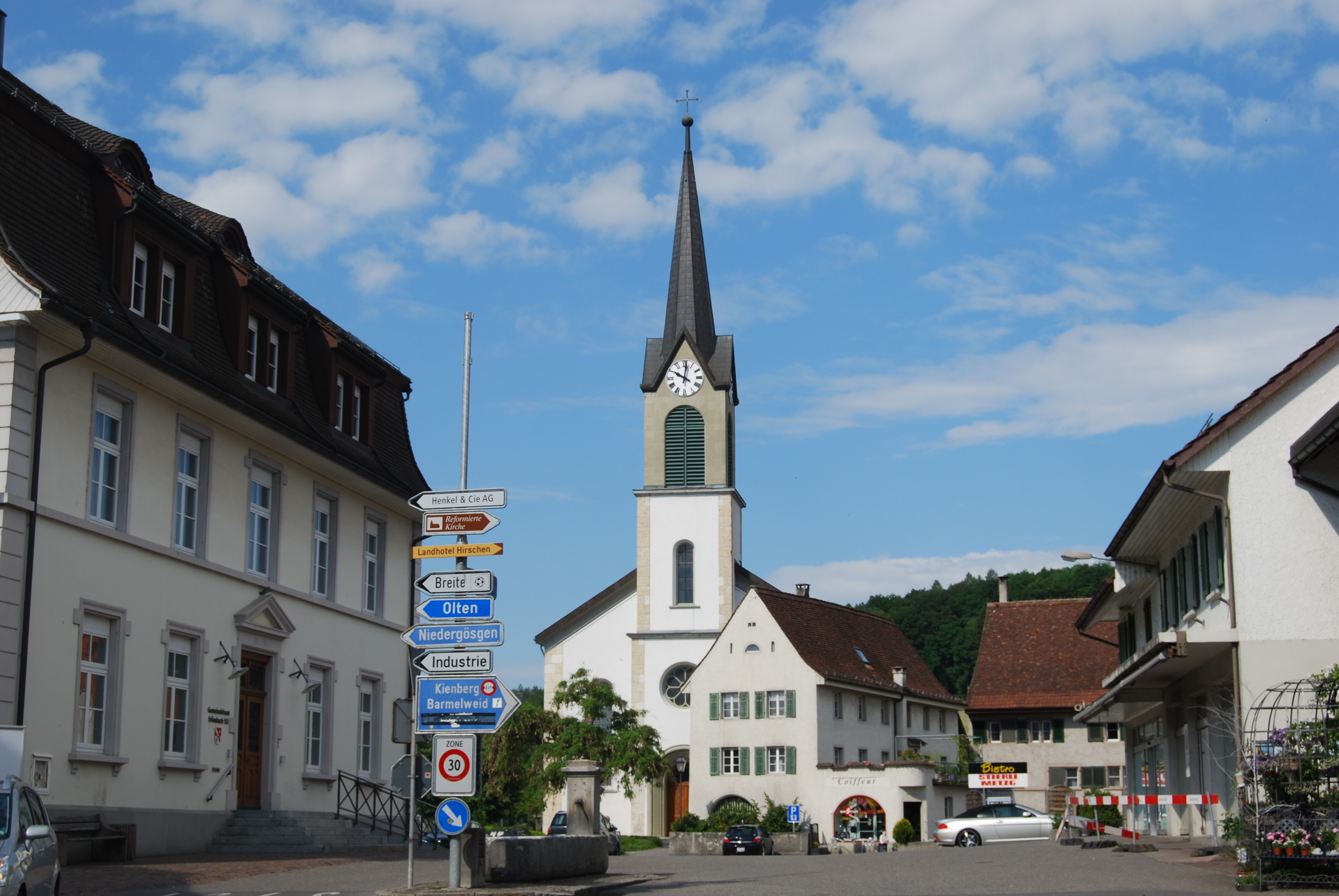

- Flag Coat of arms
- Location of Erlinsbach
- Location within Switzerland Location within Canton of Solothurn
- Coordinates: 47°24′N 8°0′E
- Country: Switzerland
- Canton: Solothurn
- District: Gösgen

Area
  - Total: 8.87 km^{2} (3.42 sq mi)
- Elevation: 423 m (1,388 ft)

Population (December 2020)
  - Total: 3,572
  - Density: 403/km^{2} (1,040/sq mi)
- Time zone: UTC+01:00 (CET)
  - Summer (DST): UTC+02:00 (CEST)
- Postal code: 5015
- SFOS number: 2503
- ISO 3166 code: CH-SO
- Surrounded by: Aarau (AG), Eppenberg-Wöschnau, Erlinsbach (AG), Kienberg, Niedergösgen, Oltingen (BL), Rohr, Schönenwerd, Stüsslingen
- Website: www.erlinsbach-so.ch

Erlinsbach is a municipality in the district of Gösgen in the canton of Solothurn in Switzerland. It was formed from the union on January 1, 2006 of Niedererlinsbach and Obererlinsbach (both were in SO and AG).

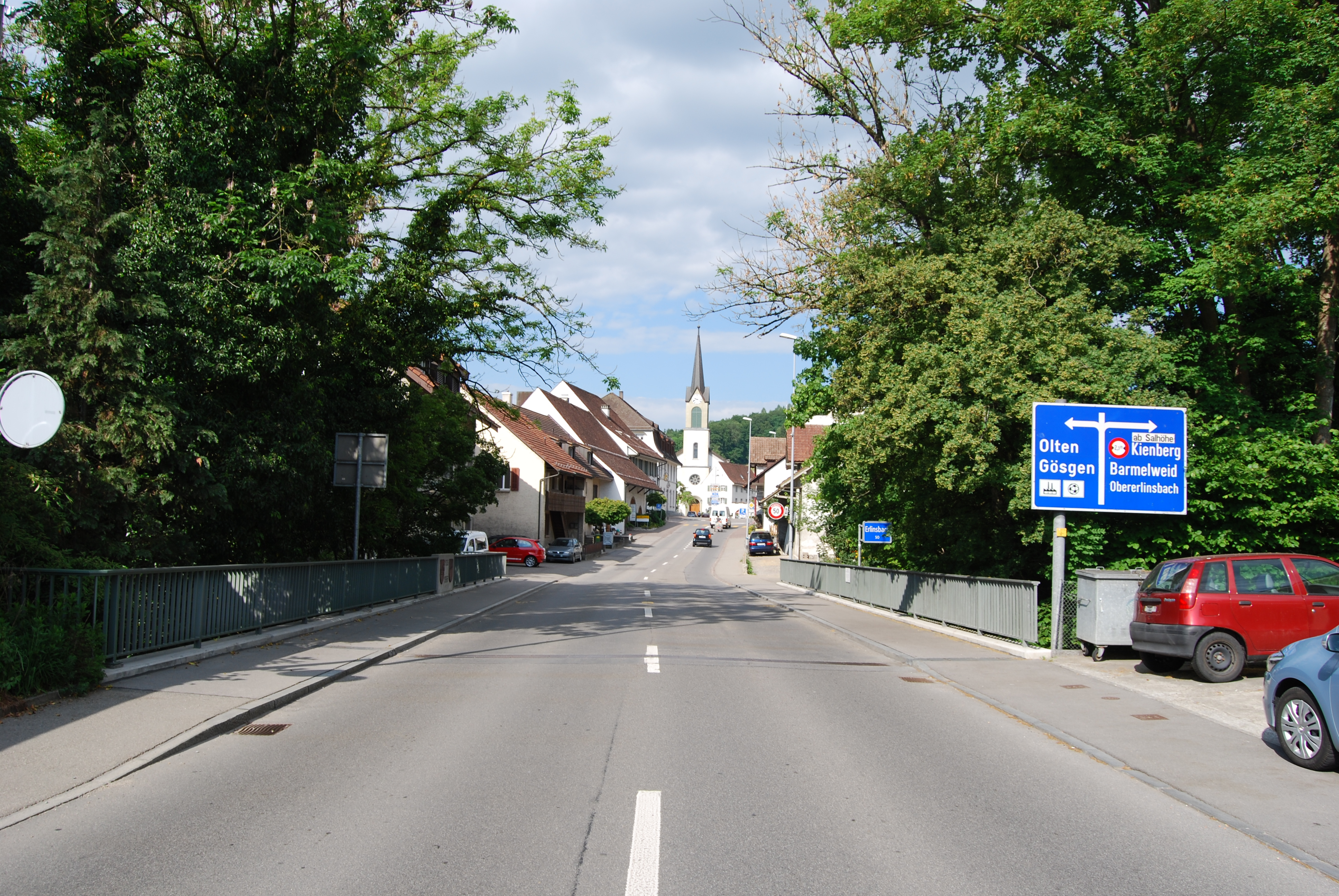
Erlinsbach SO

== History ==
Both Niedererlinsbach and Obererlinsbach were first mentioned in 1173 as Arnlesbah. In 1276 Niedererlinsbach was mentioned as ze [...] Nidern Ernlispach while Obererlinsbach was mentioned as ze Obern [...] Ernlispach.

== Coat of arms ==
The blazon of Niedererlinsbach's coat of arms is Per fess Gules and Argent a Bend wavy counterchanged. The blazon of the Obererlinsbach's coat of arms is Gules a Willow Vert issuant from a Bar wavy Argent.

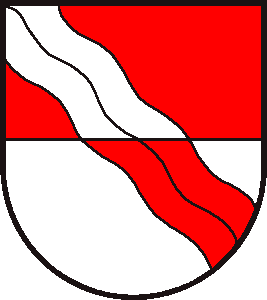
Niedererlinsbach's Coat of Arms

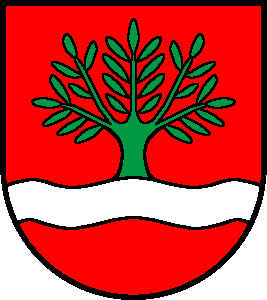
Obererlinsbach's Coat of Arms

== Geography ==
Aerial view (1953)

Erlinsbach has an area, as of 2009, of 8.87 square kilometers (3.42 sq mi). Of this area, 3.83 km^{2} (1.48 sq mi) or 43.2% is used for agricultural purposes, while 3.58 km^{2} (1.38 sq mi) or 40.4% is forested. Of the rest of the land, 1.21 km^{2} (0.47 sq mi) or 13.6% is settled (buildings or roads), 0.25 km^{2} (0.097 sq mi) or 2.8% is either rivers or lakes.

Of the built up area, housing and buildings made up 7.6% and transportation infrastructure made up 3.2%. Power and water infrastructure as well as other special developed areas made up 1.9% of the area Out of the forested land, 38.6% of the total land area is heavily forested and 1.8% is covered with orchards or small clusters of trees. Of the agricultural land, 18.4% is used for growing crops and 22.1% is pastures, while 2.7% is used for orchards or vine crops. All the water in the municipality is flowing water.

In 2006 the municipality was created through the merger of Niedererlinsbach and Obererlinsbach.

== Demographics ==
Erlinsbach has a population (as of December 2020) of 3,572. As of 2008, 14.2% of the population are resident foreign nationals. Over the last 10 years (1999–2009 ) the population has changed at a rate of 10.1%.

Of the population in the former municipality of Niedererlinsbach, 645 or about 29.4% were born in Niedererlinsbach and lived there in 2000. There were 285 or 13.0% who were born in the same canton, while 910 or 41.5% were born somewhere else in Switzerland, and 307 or 14.0% were born outside of Switzerland. As of 2000, there were 846 people who were single and never married in the municipality. There were 1,104 married individuals, 148 widows or widowers and 93 individuals who are divorced.

Of the population in the former municipality of Obererlinsbach, 175 or about 25.3% were born in Obererlinsbach and lived there in 2000. There were 66 or 9.6% who were born in the same canton, while 333 or 48.2% were born somewhere else in Switzerland, and 100 or 14.5% were born outside of Switzerland. As of 2000, there were 313 people who were single and never married in the municipality. There were 311 married individuals, 34 widows or widowers and 33 individuals who are divorced.

As of 2008, the gender distribution of the population was 48.2% male and 51.8% female. The population was made up of 1,262 Swiss men (40.2% of the population) and 249 (7.9%) non-Swiss men. There were 1,405 Swiss women (44.8%) and 220 (7.0%) non-Swiss women.

In 2008 there were 19 live births to Swiss citizens and 4 births to non-Swiss citizens, and in same time span there were 15 deaths of Swiss citizens and 1 non-Swiss citizen death. Ignoring immigration and emigration, the population of Swiss citizens increased by 4 while the foreign population increased by 3. There were 5 Swiss men and 2 Swiss women who immigrated back to Switzerland. At the same time, there were 10 non-Swiss men and 1 non-Swiss woman who immigrated from another country to Switzerland. The total Swiss population change in 2008 (from all sources, including moves across municipal borders) was an increase of 66 and the non-Swiss population increased by 14 people. This represents a population growth rate of 2.8%.

As of 2009, the construction rate of new housing units was 12.6 new units per 1000 residents. The vacancy rate for the municipality, in 2010, was 2.8%.

== Historic Population ==
The historical population is given in the following chart:

== Sights ==
The entire village of Niedererlinsbach is part of the Inventory of Swiss Heritage Sites.

== Religion ==
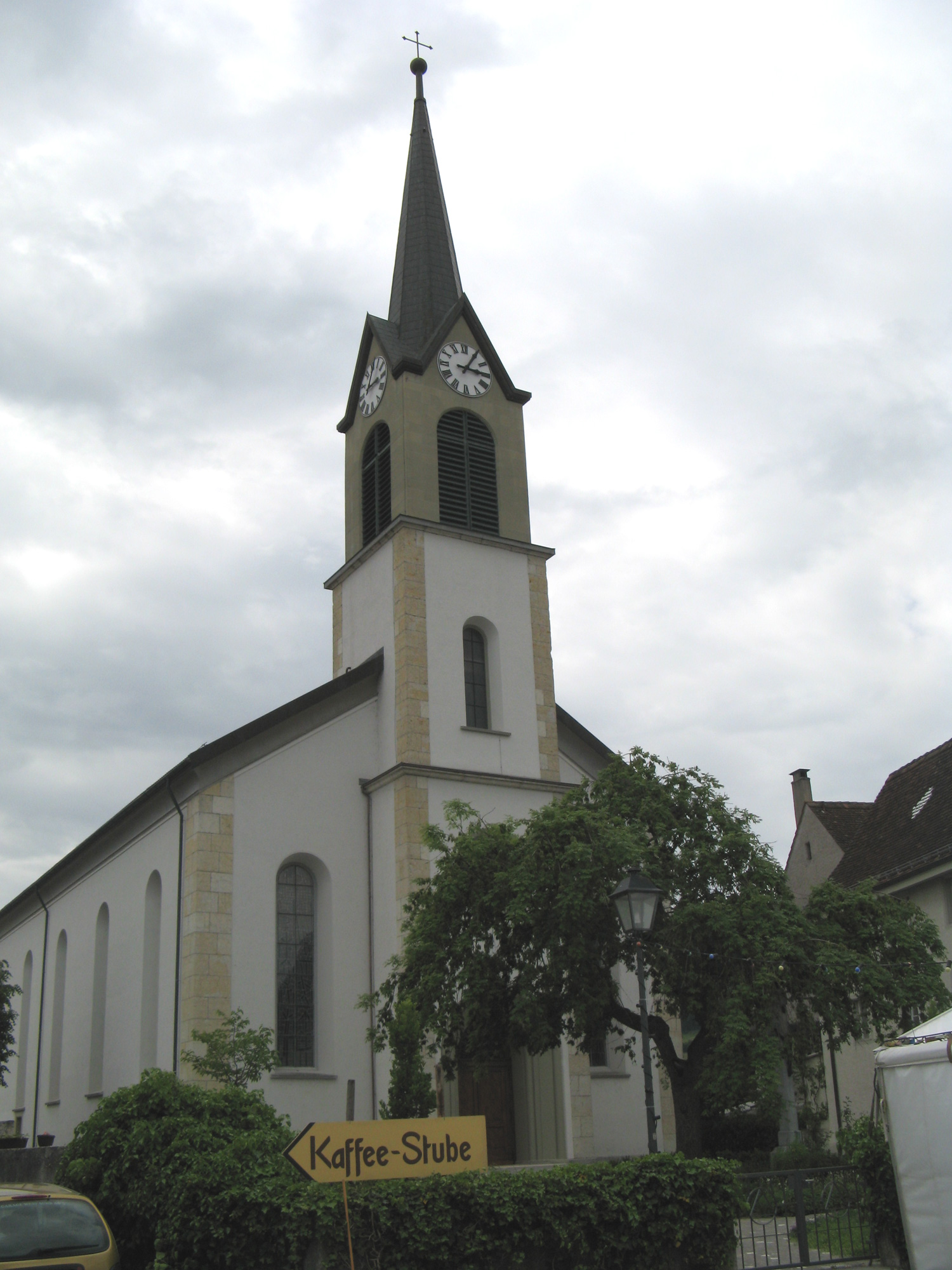
Catholic Church in Erlinsbach

From the 2000 census in Niedererlinsbach, 1,048 or 47.8% were Roman Catholic, while 637 or 29.1% belonged to the Swiss Reformed Church. Of the rest of the population, there were 50 members of an Orthodox church (or about 2.28% of the population), there were 8 individuals (or about 0.37% of the population) who belonged to the Christian Catholic Church, and there were 49 individuals (or about 2.24% of the population) who belonged to another Christian church. There were 74 (or about 3.38% of the population) who were Islamic. There were 2 individuals who were Buddhist and 2 individuals who belonged to another church. 265 (or about 12.09% of the population) belonged to no church, are agnostic or atheist, and 56 individuals (or about 2.56% of the population) did not answer the question.

In Obererlinsbach, 324 or 46.9% were Roman Catholic, while 219 or 31.7% belonged to the Swiss Reformed Church. Of the rest of the population, there were 2 members of an Orthodox church (or about 0.29% of the population), there were 3 individuals (or about 0.43% of the population) who belonged to the Christian Catholic Church, and there were 28 individuals (or about 4.05% of the population) who belonged to another Christian church. There were 16 (or about 2.32% of the population) who were Islamic. There were 5 individuals who were Hindu. 91 (or about 13.17% of the population) belonged to no church, are agnostic or atheist, and 3 individuals (or about 0.43% of the population) did not answer the question.

== Politics ==
In the 2007 federal election the most popular party was the SVP which received 33.97% of the vote. The next three most popular parties were the CVP (19.77%), the FDP (16.32%) and the SP (14.68%). In the federal election, a total of 1,050 votes were cast, and the voter turnout was 51.2%.

== Economy ==
As of 2010, Erlinsbach had an unemployment rate of 2.4%. As of 2008, there were 43 people employed in the primary economic sector and about 17 businesses involved in this sector. 149 people were employed in the secondary sector and there were 23 businesses in this sector. 431 people were employed in the tertiary sector, with 74 businesses in this sector.

In 2008 the total number of full-time equivalent jobs was 503. The number of jobs in the primary sector was 26, all of which were in agriculture. The number of jobs in the secondary sector was 144 of which 91 or (63.2%) were in manufacturing, 11 or (7.6%) were in mining and 42 (29.2%) were in construction. The number of jobs in the tertiary sector was 333. In the tertiary sector; 97 or 29.1% were in wholesale or retail sales or the repair of motor vehicles, 6 or 1.8% were in the movement and storage of goods, 71 or 21.3% were in a hotel or restaurant, 2 or 0.6% were in the information industry, 14 or 4.2% were the insurance or financial industry, 21 or 6.3% were technical professionals or scientists, 18 or 5.4% were in education and 58 or 17.4% were in health care.

Of the working population, 24.9% used public transportation to get to work, and 51.6% used a private car.

In 2000, there were 342 workers who commuted into Niedererlinsbach and 850 workers who commuted away. The municipality is a net exporter of workers, with about 2.5 workers leaving the municipality for every one entering.

In 2000, there were 67 workers who commuted into Obererlinsbach and 295 workers who commuted away. The municipality is a net exporter of workers, with about 4.4 workers leaving the municipality for every one entering.

== Education ==
In Niedererlinsbach about 853 or (38.9%) of the population have completed non-mandatory upper secondary education, and 246 or (11.2%) have completed additional higher education (either university or a Fachhochschule). Of the 246 who completed tertiary schooling, 63.0% were Swiss men, 23.6% were Swiss women, 6.9% were non-Swiss men and 6.5% were non-Swiss women. As of 2000, there were 10 students in Niedererlinsbach who came from another municipality, while 173 residents attended schools outside the municipality.

In Obererlinsbach about 297 or (43.0%) of the population have completed non-mandatory upper secondary education, and 89 or (12.9%) have completed additional higher education (either university or a Fachhochschule). Of the 89 who completed tertiary schooling, 58.4% were Swiss men, 22.5% were Swiss women, 9.0% were non-Swiss men and 10.1% were non-Swiss women. As of 2000, there were 14 students in Obererlinsbach who came from another municipality, while 42 residents attended schools outside the municipality.
