= Paul Sahli =

Paul Sahli (born 24 April 1948) is a Swiss juggler from Lostorf, Switzerland.

Sahli holds 64 world records, and in 2007 claimed that this was more than any other living person. This record was surpassed, however, by Ashrita Furman, who in 2009 was recognized by Guinness World Records as the person holding the most records simultaneously. All his records have something to do with balls and/or juggling, generally with his feet.

He retired from professional juggling in 2009 after a car accident, but continued with his ball-based games. In June 2020, Sahli suffered a bicycle accident that left him with a severe shoulder and hand injury.

== Achievements ==
A selection of his world-records:

- 1987 Juggling a ball for 14 Hours, 17 Minutes, and 40 Seconds, touching the ball 94,360 times in the process.
- 1995 Juggling a 3 kg medicine ball with his feet for 1 Hour, 6 Minutes, touching the ball 8,107 times. This is equivalent to a total weight-change of 24 tons.
- 2002 Juggling a soccer ball while climbing up a fire ladder for 111 steps.
- 2004 Juggling a tennis ball while climbing up a fire ladder for 50 steps.
