= Stüsslingen =

- Municipality
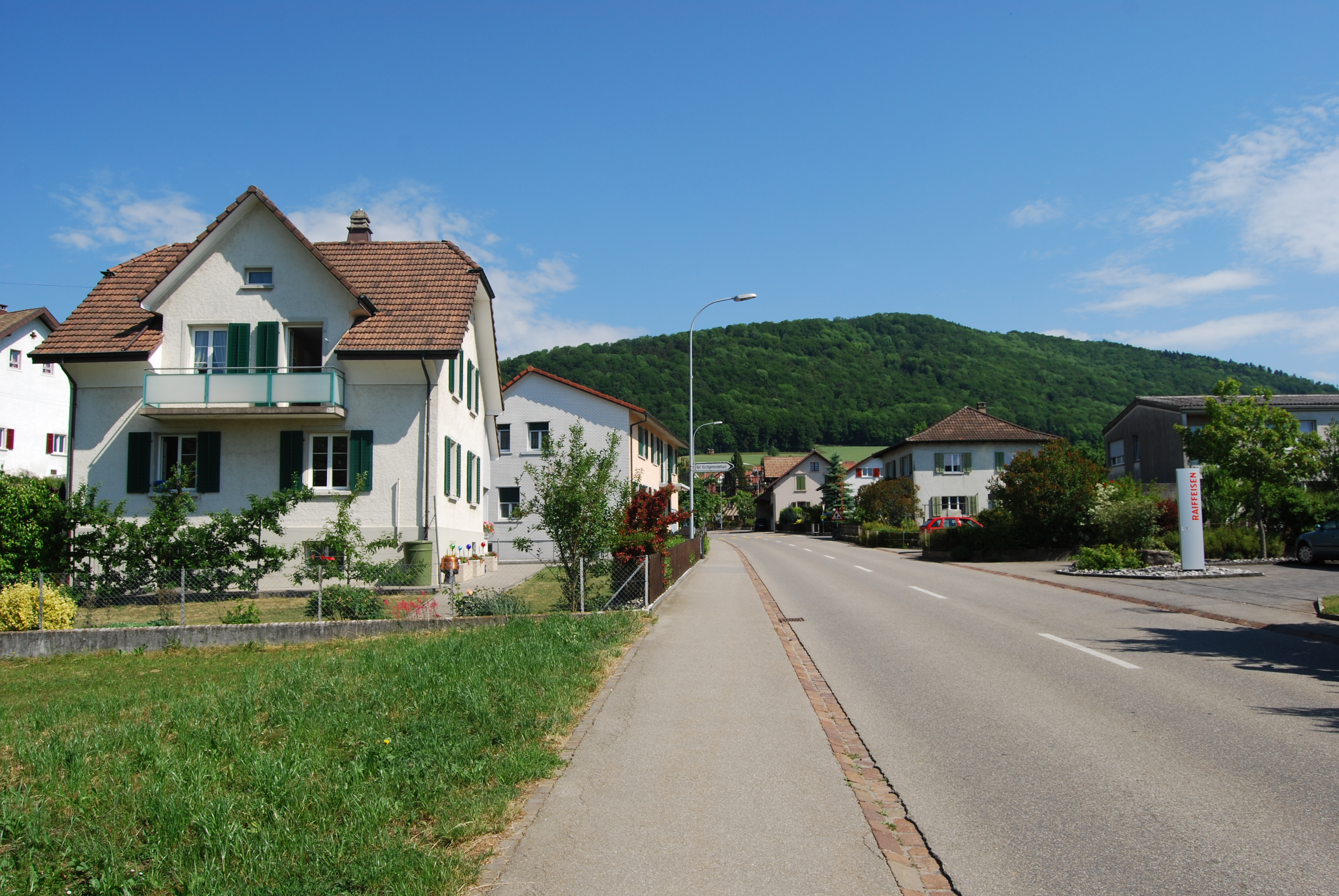

- Coat of arms
- Location of Stüsslingen
- Location within Switzerland Location within Canton of Solothurn
- Coordinates: 47°24′N 7°58′E
- Country: Switzerland
- Canton: Solothurn
- District: Gösgen

Area
  - Total: 8.40 km^{2} (3.24 sq mi)
- Elevation: 465 m (1,526 ft)

Population (December 2020)
  - Total: 1,129
  - Density: 134/km^{2} (348/sq mi)
- Time zone: UTC+01:00 (CET)
  - Summer (DST): UTC+02:00 (CEST)
- Postal code: 4655
- SFOS number: 2499
- ISO 3166 code: CH-SO
- Surrounded by: Lostorf, Niedererlinsbach, Niedergösgen, Obererlinsbach
- Website: www.stuesslingen.ch

Stüsslingen is a municipality in the district of Gösgen in the canton of Solothurn in Switzerland. On 1 January 2021 the former municipality of Rohr merged into Stüsslingen.

== History ==
Stüsslingen is first mentioned in 1226 as Stuzelingen.

=== Rohr ===
Rohr is first mentioned around 1217-22 as Rôre.

== Geography ==
Aerial view (1967)

After the 2021 merger, Stüsslingen has an area, (as of the 2004/09 survey), of 8.39 km^{2} (3.24 sq mi). Of this area, 3.03 km^{2} (1.17 sq mi) or 49.0% is used for agricultural purposes, while 2.2 km^{2} (0.85 sq mi) or 35.6% is forested. Of the rest of the land, 0.91 km^{2} (0.35 sq mi) or 14.7% is settled (buildings or roads), 0.01 km^{2} (2.5 acres) or 0.2% is either rivers or lakes.

Of the built up area, housing and buildings made up 5.7% and transportation infrastructure made up 3.2%. while parks, green belts and sports fields made up 5.3%. Out of the forested land, 34.5% of the total land area is heavily forested and 1.1% is covered with orchards or small clusters of trees. Of the agricultural land, 25.6% is used for growing crops and 20.6% is pastures, while 2.9% is used for orchards or vine crops. All the water in the municipality is flowing water.

The municipality is located in the Gösgen district, along a stream in the foot hills of the Rebenfluh and Gugenkette mountains.

== Coat of arms ==
The blazon of the municipal coat of arms is Azure three Mullets of five Or, one and two.

== Demographics ==
Stüsslingen has a population (as of December 2020) of 1,129. As of 2008, 4.6% of the population are resident foreign nationals. Over the last 10 years (1999–2009 ) the population has changed at a rate of 2.6%.

Most of the population (as of 2000) speaks German (913 or 96.6%), with Italian being second most common (6 or 0.6%) and French being third (5 or 0.5%). There are 5 people who speak Romansh.

As of 2008, the gender distribution of the population was 50.5% male and 49.5% female. The population was made up of 474 Swiss men (47.5% of the population) and 30 (3.0%) non-Swiss men. There were 470 Swiss women (47.1%) and 24 (2.4%) non-Swiss women. Of the population in the municipality 348 or about 36.8% were born in Stüsslingen and lived there in 2000. There were 275 or 29.1% who were born in the same canton, while 263 or 27.8% were born somewhere else in Switzerland, and 51 or 5.4% were born outside of Switzerland.

In 2008 there were 9 live births to Swiss citizens and were 13 deaths of Swiss citizens. Ignoring immigration and emigration, the population of Swiss citizens decreased by 4 while the foreign population remained the same. There was 1 non-Swiss man who emigrated from Switzerland to another country and 2 non-Swiss women who immigrated from another country to Switzerland. The total Swiss population change in 2008 (from all sources, including moves across municipal borders) was a decrease of 11 and the non-Swiss population increased by 3 people. This represents a population growth rate of -0.8%.

The age distribution, as of 2000, in Stüsslingen is; 61 children or 6.5% of the population are between 0 and 6 years old and 204 teenagers or 21.6% are between 7 and 19. Of the adult population, 50 people or 5.3% of the population are between 20 and 24 years old. 256 people or 27.1% are between 25 and 44, and 270 people or 28.6% are between 45 and 64. The senior population distribution is 80 people or 8.5% of the population are between 65 and 79 years old and there are 24 people or 2.5% who are over 80.

As of 2000, there were 406 people who were single and never married in the municipality. There were 483 married individuals, 34 widows or widowers and 22 individuals who are divorced.

As of 2000, there were 348 private households in the municipality, and an average of 2.7 persons per household. There were 67 households that consist of only one person and 35 households with five or more people. Out of a total of 352 households that answered this question, 19.0% were households made up of just one person and there were 6 adults who lived with their parents. Of the rest of the households, there are 107 married couples without children, 148 married couples with children There were 14 single parents with a child or children. There were 6 households that were made up of unrelated people and 4 households that were made up of some sort of institution or another collective housing.

In 2000 there were 194 single family homes (or 68.6% of the total) out of a total of 283 inhabited buildings. There were 30 multi-family buildings (10.6%), along with 48 multi-purpose buildings that were mostly used for housing (17.0%) and 11 other use buildings (commercial or industrial) that also had some housing (3.9%). Of the single family homes 25 were built before 1919, while 17 were built between 1990 and 2000. The greatest number of single family homes (79) were built between 1971 and 1980.

In 2000 there were 362 apartments in the municipality. The most common apartment size was 5 rooms of which there were 141. There were 5 single room apartments and 223 apartments with five or more rooms. Of these apartments, a total of 341 apartments (94.2% of the total) were permanently occupied, while 7 apartments (1.9%) were seasonally occupied and 14 apartments (3.9%) were empty. As of 2009, the construction rate of new housing units was 6.1 new units per 1000 residents. The vacancy rate for the municipality, in 2010, was 2.26%.

== Historic Population ==
The historical population is given in the following chart:

== Politics ==
In the 2007 federal election the most popular party was the SVP which received 29.6% of the vote. The next three most popular parties were the FDP (25.56%), the CVP (21.22%) and the SP (11.43%). In the federal election, a total of 474 votes were cast, and the voter turnout was 60.5%.

== Economy ==
As of 2010, Stüsslingen had an unemployment rate of 1.7%. As of 2008, there were 45 people employed in the primary economic sector and about 18 businesses involved in this sector. 27 people were employed in the secondary sector and there were 7 businesses in this sector. 98 people were employed in the tertiary sector, with 27 businesses in this sector. There were 537 residents of the municipality who were employed in some capacity, of which females made up 43.4% of the workforce.

In 2008 the total number of full-time equivalent jobs was 126. The number of jobs in the primary sector was 26, all of which were in agriculture. The number of jobs in the secondary sector was 26 of which 3 or (11.5%) were in manufacturing and 23 (88.5%) were in construction. The number of jobs in the tertiary sector was 74. In the tertiary sector; 16 or 21.6% were in wholesale or retail sales or the repair of motor vehicles, 5 or 6.8% were in the movement and storage of goods, 22 or 29.7% were in a hotel or restaurant, 1 was in the information industry, 2 or 2.7% were technical professionals or scientists, 7 or 9.5% were in education.

In 2000, there were 53 workers who commuted into the municipality and 405 workers who commuted away. The municipality is a net exporter of workers, with about 7.6 workers leaving the municipality for every one entering. Of the working population, 15.8% used public transportation to get to work, and 58.8% used a private car.

== Religion ==
From the 2000 census, 544 or 57.6% were Roman Catholic, while 234 or 24.8% belonged to the Swiss Reformed Church. Of the rest of the population, there were 10 individuals (or about 1.06% of the population) who belonged to the Christian Catholic Church, and there were 4 individuals (or about 0.42% of the population) who belonged to another Christian church. There were 14 (or about 1.48% of the population) who were Islamic. There was 1 individual who belonged to another church. 132 (or about 13.97% of the population) belonged to no church, are agnostic or atheist, and 6 individuals (or about 0.63% of the population) did not answer the question.

== Education ==
In Stüsslingen about 411 or (43.5%) of the population have completed non-mandatory upper secondary education, and 106 or (11.2%) have completed additional higher education (either university or a Fachhochschule). Of the 106 who completed tertiary schooling, 80.2% were Swiss men, 13.2% were Swiss women, 5.7% were non-Swiss men.

As of 2000, there were 20 students in Stüsslingen who came from another municipality, while 81 residents attended schools outside the municipality.
