= Rohr, Solothurn =

Rohr
- Former municipality
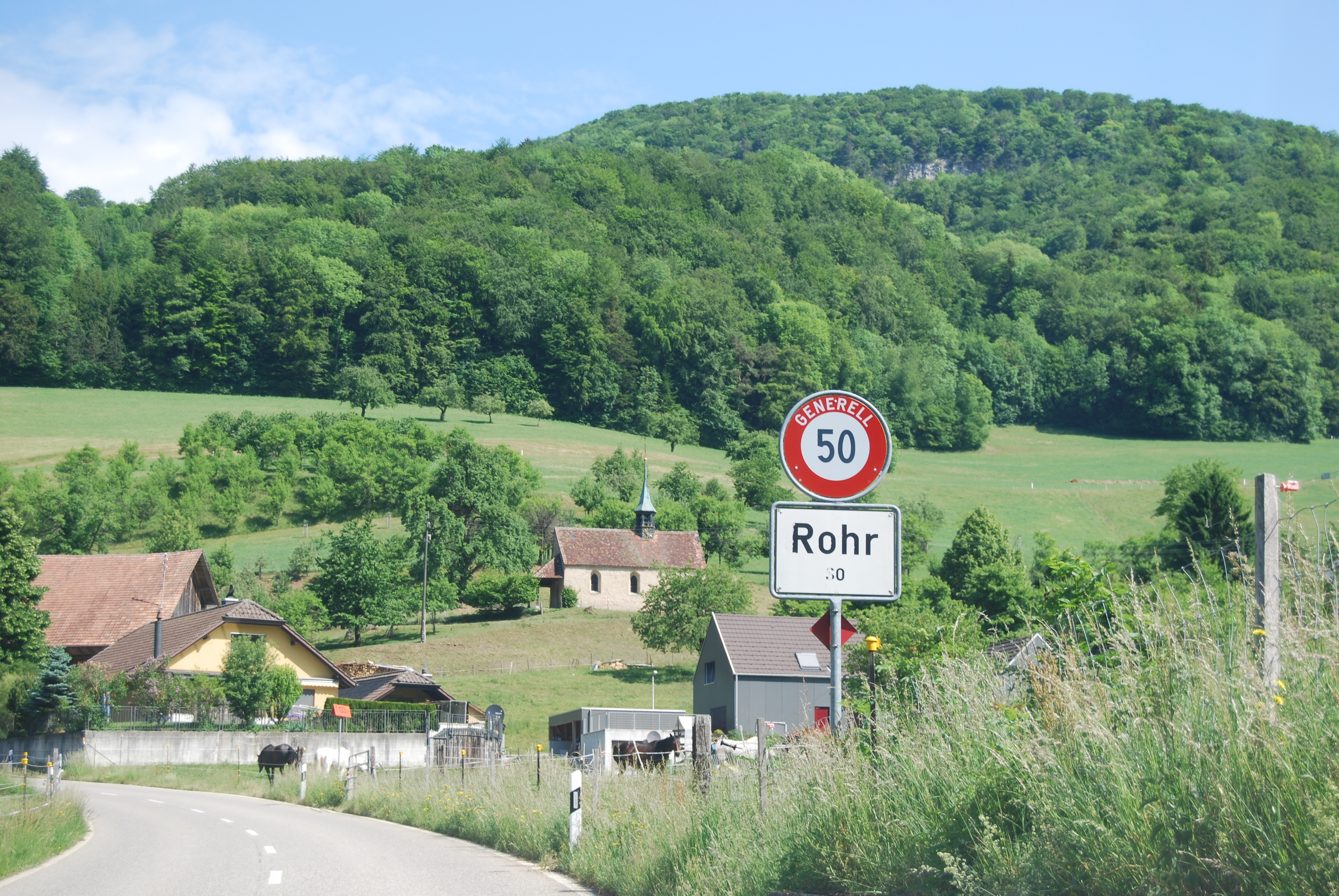

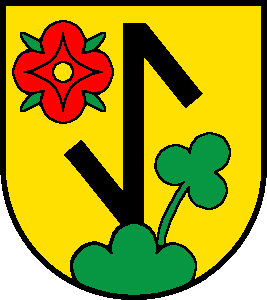
- Coat of arms
- Location of Rohr
- Location within Switzerland Location within Canton of Solothurn
- Coordinates: 47°25′N 7°57′E
- Country: Switzerland
- Canton: Solothurn
- District: Gösgen

Area
  - Total: 2.23 km^{2} (0.86 sq mi)
- Elevation: 578 m (1,896 ft)

Population (December 2019)
  - Total: 91
  - Density: 41/km^{2} (110/sq mi)
- Time zone: UTC+01:00 (CET)
  - Summer (DST): UTC+02:00 (CEST)
- Postal code: 4655
- SFOS number: 2498
- ISO 3166 code: CH-SO
- Surrounded by: Lostorf, Obererlinsbach, Oltingen (BL), Stüsslingen, Zeglingen (BL)
- Website: www.rohr-so.ch

Rohr (German pronunciation: [ʁoːɐ̯]) is a former municipality in the district of Gösgen in the canton of Solothurn in Switzerland. On 1 January 2021 the former municipality of Rohr merged into Stüsslingen.

== History ==
Rohr is first mentioned around 1217-22 as Rôre.

== Geography ==
Rohr had an area, as of 2009, of 2.23 square kilometers (0.86 sq mi). Of this area, 1 km^{2} (0.39 sq mi) or 44.8% is used for agricultural purposes, while 1.12 km^{2} (0.43 sq mi) or 50.2% is forested. Of the rest of the land, 0.12 km^{2} (30 acres) or 5.4% is settled (buildings or roads), 0.01 km^{2} (2.5 acres) or 0.4% is either rivers or lakes.

Of the built up area, housing and buildings made up 2.2% and transportation infrastructure made up 3.1%. Out of the forested land, 43.9% of the total land area is heavily forested and 6.3% is covered with orchards or small clusters of trees. Of the agricultural land, 2.2% is used for growing crops and 39.0% is pastures, while 3.6% is used for orchards or vine crops. All the water in the municipality is flowing water.

The former municipality is located in the Gösgen district, on the southern slope of the Schafmatt Pass.

== Coat of arms ==
The blazon of the municipal coat of arms is Or a House Mark Sable and in sinister a Trefoil Vert slipped both issuant from a Mount of 3 Coupeaux of the last and in chief dexter a Quatrefoil Rose Gules barbed and seeded proper.

== Demographics ==
Rohr had a population (as of 2019) of 91. As of 2008, 8.6% of the population are resident foreign nationals. Over the last 10 years (1999–2009 ) the population has changed at a rate of -20.7%.

Most of the population (as of 2000) speaks German (107 or 96.4%), with English being second most common (3 or 2.7%) and Polnisch being third (1 or 0.9%). There are people who speak French.

As of 2008, the gender distribution of the population was 53.9% male and 46.1% female. The population was made up of 44 Swiss men (49.4% of the population) and 4 (4.5%) non-Swiss men. There were 38 Swiss women (42.7%) and 3 (3.4%) non-Swiss women. Of the population in the municipality, 31 or about 27.9% were born in Rohr and lived there in 2000. There were 29 or 26.1% who were born in the same canton, while 47 or 42.3% were born somewhere else in Switzerland, and 4 or 3.6% were born outside of Switzerland.

In 2008 there was 1 live birth to Swiss citizens. Ignoring immigration and emigration, the population of Swiss citizens increased by 1 while the foreign population remained the same. There was 1 Swiss man who immigrated back to Switzerland. At the same time, there were 2 non-Swiss men who immigrated from another country to Switzerland. The total Swiss population change in 2008 (from all sources, including moves across municipal borders) was an increase of 1 and the non-Swiss population remained the same. This represents a population growth rate of 1.1%.

The age distribution, as of 2000, in Rohr is; 12 children or 10.8% of the population are between 0 and 6 years old and 21 teenagers or 18.9% are between 7 and 19. Of the adult population, 7 people or 6.3% of the population are between 20 and 24 years old. 32 people or 28.8% are between 25 and 44, and 23 people or 20.7% are between 45 and 64. The senior population distribution is 15 people or 13.5% of the population are between 65 and 79 years old and there is 1 person who is over 80.

As of 2000, there were 49 people who were single and never married in the municipality. There were 58 married individuals, 2 widows or widowers and 2 individuals who are divorced.

As of 2000, there were 40 private households in the municipality, and an average of 2.8 persons per household. There were 8 households that consist of only one person and 6 households with five or more people. Out of a total of 40 households that answered this question, 20.0% were households made up of just one person. Of the rest of the households, there are 11 married couples without children, 19 married couples with children There was one single parent with a child or children. There was 1 household that was made up of unrelated people.

In 2000 there were 19 single family homes (or 54.3% of the total) out of a total of 35 inhabited buildings. There were 2 multi-family buildings (5.7%), along with 11 multi-purpose buildings that were mostly used for housing (31.4%) and 3 other use buildings (commercial or industrial) that also had some housing (8.6%). Of the single family homes 5 were built before 1919, while 5 were built between 1990 and 2000. The greatest number of single family homes (7) were built between 1981 and 1990.

In 2000 there were 43 apartments in the municipality. The most common apartment size was 4 rooms of which there were 16. There were 1 single room apartments and 15 apartments with five or more rooms. Of these apartments, a total of 38 apartments (88.4% of the total) were permanently occupied, while 3 apartments (7.0%) were seasonally occupied and 2 apartments (4.7%) were empty. As of 2009, the construction rate of new housing units was 0 new units per 1000 residents. The vacancy rate for the municipality, in 2010, was 11.11%.

The historical population is given in the following chart:

== Politics ==
In the 2007 federal election the most popular party was the CVP which received 35.71% of the vote. The next three most popular parties were the Green Party (27.07%), the FDP (21.43%) and the SVP (10.9%). In the federal election, a total of 39 votes were cast, and the voter turnout was 57.4%.

== Economy ==
As of 2010, Rohr had an unemployment rate of 6.1%. As of 2008, there were 22 people employed in the primary economic sector and about 7 businesses involved in this sector. 3 people were employed in the secondary sector and there was 1 business in this sector. 5 people were employed in the tertiary sector, with 3 businesses in this sector. There were 53 residents of the municipality who were employed in some capacity, of which females made up 35.8% of the workforce.

In 2008 the total number of full-time equivalent jobs was 19. The number of jobs in the primary sector was 13, all of which were in agriculture. The number of jobs in the secondary sector was 2, all in construction. The number of jobs in the tertiary sector was 4. In the tertiary sector; 1 was in a hotel or restaurant, 2 were in the information industry and 1 was a technical professional or scientist.

In 2000, there were 3 workers who commuted into the municipality and 33 workers who commuted away. The municipality is a net exporter of workers, with about 11.0 workers leaving the municipality for every one entering. Of the working population, 9.4% used public transportation to get to work, and 56.6% used a private car.

== Religion ==
From the 2000 census, 50 or 45.0% were Roman Catholic, while 37 or 33.3% belonged to the Swiss Reformed Church. Of the rest of the population, and there were 4 individuals (or about 3.60% of the population) who belonged to another Christian church. 18 (or about 16.22% of the population) belonged to no church, are agnostic or atheist, and 1 individuals (or about 0.90% of the population) did not answer the question.

== Education ==
In Rohr about 45 or (40.5%) of the population have completed non-mandatory upper secondary education, and 12 or (10.8%) have completed additional higher education (either university or a Fachhochschule). Of the 12 who completed tertiary schooling, 66.7% were Swiss men, 16.7% were Swiss women.

As of 2000, there were 19 students in Rohr who came from another municipality, while 20 residents attended schools outside the municipality.
