= Wisen =

- Municipality
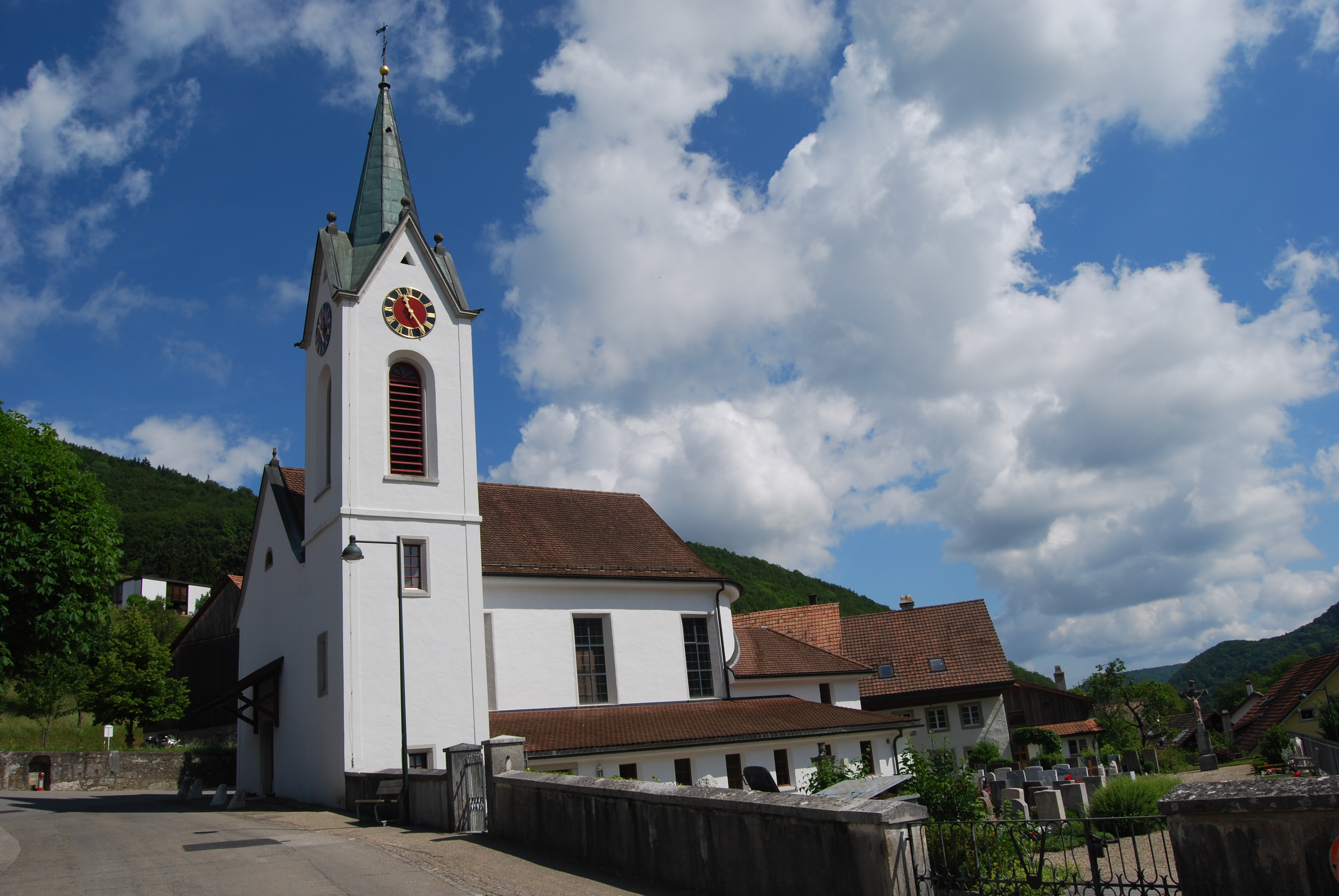

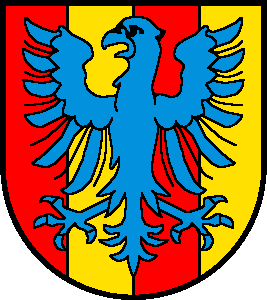
- Coat of arms
- Location of Wisen
- Location within Switzerland Location within Canton of Solothurn
- Coordinates: 47°24′N 7°53′E
- Country: Switzerland
- Canton: Solothurn
- District: Gösgen

Area
  - Total: 4.78 km^{2} (1.85 sq mi)
- Elevation: 682 m (2,238 ft)

Population (December 2020)
  - Total: 442
  - Density: 92.5/km^{2} (239/sq mi)
- Time zone: UTC+01:00 (CET)
  - Summer (DST): UTC+02:00 (CEST)
- Postal code: 4634
- SFOS number: 2502
- ISO 3166 code: CH-SO
- Surrounded by: Häfelfingen (BL), Hauenstein-Ifenthal, Läufelfingen (BL), Lostorf, Trimbach, Zeglingen (BL)
- Website: www.wisen.ch

Wisen is a municipality in the district of Gösgen in the canton of Solothurn in Switzerland.

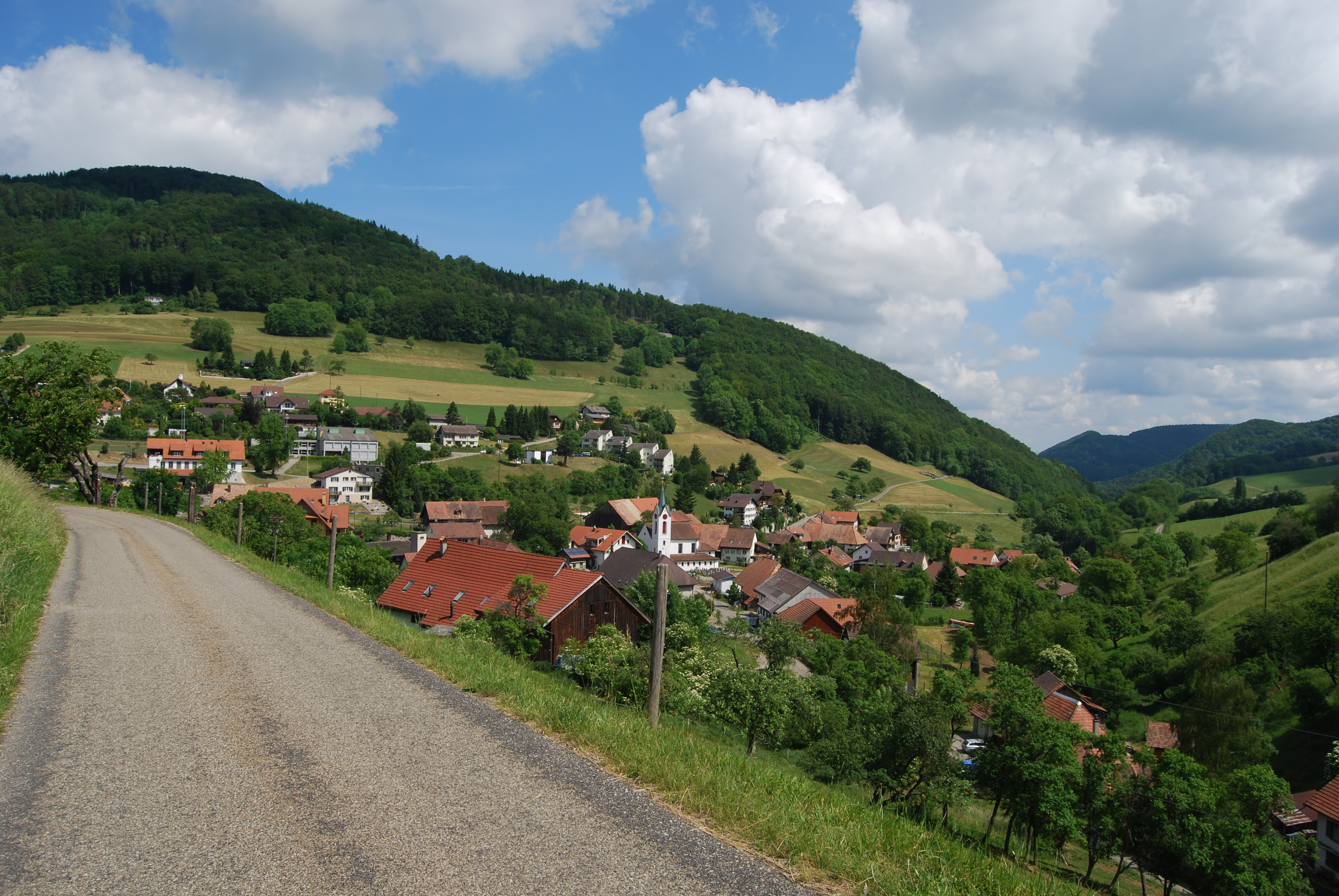
Wisen

== Geography ==
Wisen has an area, as of 2009, of 4.78 square kilometers (1.85 sq mi). Of this area, 2.59 km^{2} (1.00 sq mi) or 54.2% is used for agricultural purposes, while 1.92 km^{2} (0.74 sq mi) or 40.2% is forested. Of the rest of the land, 0.29 km^{2} (0.11 sq mi) or 6.1% is settled (buildings or roads).

Of the built up area, housing and buildings made up 2.9% and transportation infrastructure made up 2.5%. Out of the forested land, 36.4% of the total land area is heavily forested and 3.8% is covered with orchards or small clusters of trees. Of the agricultural land, 8.2% is used for growing crops and 36.6% is pastures, while 2.3% is used for orchards or vine crops and 7.1% is used for alpine pastures.

The municipalities of Hauenstein-Ifenthal, Trimbach, Wisen and Olten are considering a merger at a date in the future into the new municipality of with an, as of 2011, undetermined name.

== Coat of arms ==
The blazon of the municipal coat of arms is Paly of four Gules and Or overall an Eagle displayed Azure.

== Demographics ==
Wisen has a population (as of December 2020) of 442. As of 2008, 2.9% of the population are resident foreign nationals. Over the last 10 years (1999–2009 ) the population has changed at a rate of 1.7%.

Most of the population (as of 2000) speaks German (411 or 97.9%), with Romansh being second most common (3 or 0.7%) and Romansh being third (3 or 0.7%).

As of 2008, the gender distribution of the population was 51.0% male and 49.0% female. The population was made up of 202 Swiss men (48.8% of the population) and 9 (2.2%) non-Swiss men. There were 193 Swiss women (46.6%) and 10 (2.4%) non-Swiss women. Of the population in the municipality 134 or about 31.9% were born in Wisen and lived there in 2000. There were 89 or 21.2% who were born in the same canton, while 168 or 40.0% were born somewhere else in Switzerland, and 25 or 6.0% were born outside of Switzerland.

In 2008 there was 1 live birth to Swiss citizens and were 3 deaths of Swiss citizens. Ignoring immigration and emigration, the population of Swiss citizens decreased by 2 while the foreign population remained the same. There were 2 Swiss men and 1 Swiss woman who immigrated back to Switzerland. At the same time, there was 1 non-Swiss man who immigrated from another country to Switzerland. The total Swiss population change in 2008 (from all sources, including moves across municipal borders) was an increase of 7 and the non-Swiss population increased by 1 people. This represents a population growth rate of 2.0%.

As of 2000, there were 177 people who were single and never married in the municipality. There were 210 married individuals, 19 widows or widowers and 14 individuals who are divorced.

As of 2000, there were 158 private households in the municipality, and an average of 2.6 persons per household. There were 39 households that consist of only one person and 14 households with five or more people. Out of a total of 161 households that answered this question, 24.2% were households made up of just one person and there were 4 adults who lived with their parents. Of the rest of the households, there are 45 married couples without children, 61 married couples with children There were 7 single parents with a child or children. There were 2 households that were made up of unrelated people and 3 households that were made up of some sort of institution or another collective housing.

In 2000 there were 86 single-family homes (or 64.7% of the total) out of a total of 133 inhabited buildings. There were 19 multi-family buildings (14.3%), along with 25 multi-purpose buildings that were mostly used for housing (18.8%) and 3 other use buildings (commercial or industrial) that also had some housing (2.3%). Of the single-family homes 20 were built before 1919, while 12 were built between 1990 and 2000. The greatest number of single-family homes (28) were built between 1971 and 1980.

In 2000 there were 174 apartments in the municipality. The most common apartment size was 4 rooms of which there were 48. There were 4 single-room apartments and 80 apartments with five or more rooms. Of these apartments, a total of 152 apartments (87.4% of the total) were permanently occupied, while 16 apartments (9.2%) were seasonally occupied and 6 apartments (3.4%) were empty. As of 2009, the construction rate of new housing units was 0 new units per 1000 residents. The vacancy rate for the municipality, in 2010, was 0.53%.

The historical population is given in the following chart:

== Politics ==
In the 2007 federal election the most popular party was the SVP which received 22.37% of the vote. The next three most popular parties were the SP (21.74%), the FDP (19.27%) and the Green Party (17.52%). In the federal election, a total of 184 votes were cast, and the voter turnout was 56.8%.

== Economy ==
As of 2010, Wisen had an unemployment rate of 2%. As of 2008, there were 33 people employed in the primary economic sector and about 13 businesses involved in this sector. 5 people were employed in the secondary sector and there were 2 businesses in this sector. 37 people were employed in the tertiary sector, with 9 businesses in this sector. There were 231 residents of the municipality who were employed in some capacity, of which females made up 42.9% of the workforce.

In 2008 the total number of full-time equivalent jobs was 47. The number of jobs in the primary sector was 19, all of which were in agriculture. The number of jobs in the secondary sector was 5, all of which were in manufacturing. The number of jobs in the tertiary sector was 23. In the tertiary sector; 1 was in the sale or repair of motor vehicles, 1 was in the movement and storage of goods, 11 or 47.8% were in a hotel or restaurant, 1 was a technical professional or scientist, 3 or 13.0% were in education and 5 or 21.7% were in health care.

In 2000, there were 14 workers who commuted into the municipality and 162 workers who commuted away. The municipality is a net exporter of workers, with about 11.6 workers leaving the municipality for every one entering. Of the working population, 13.9% used public transportation to get to work, and 59.3% used a private car.

== Religion ==
From the 2000 census, 167 or 39.8% were Roman Catholic, while 136 or 32.4% belonged to the Swiss Reformed Church. Of the rest of the population, there was 1 member of an Orthodox church who belonged, and there were 21 individuals (or about 5.00% of the population) who belonged to another Christian church. 88 (or about 20.95% of the population) belonged to no church, are agnostic or atheist, and 6 individuals (or about 1.43% of the population) did not answer the question.

== Education ==
In Wisen about 176 or (41.9%) of the population have completed non-mandatory upper secondary education, and 46 or (11.0%) have completed additional higher education (either university or a Fachhochschule). Of the 46 who completed tertiary schooling, 76.1% were Swiss men, 15.2% were Swiss women. As of 2000, there were 11 students in Wisen who came from another municipality, while 28 residents attended schools outside the municipality.
