= Läufelfingen =

- Municipality
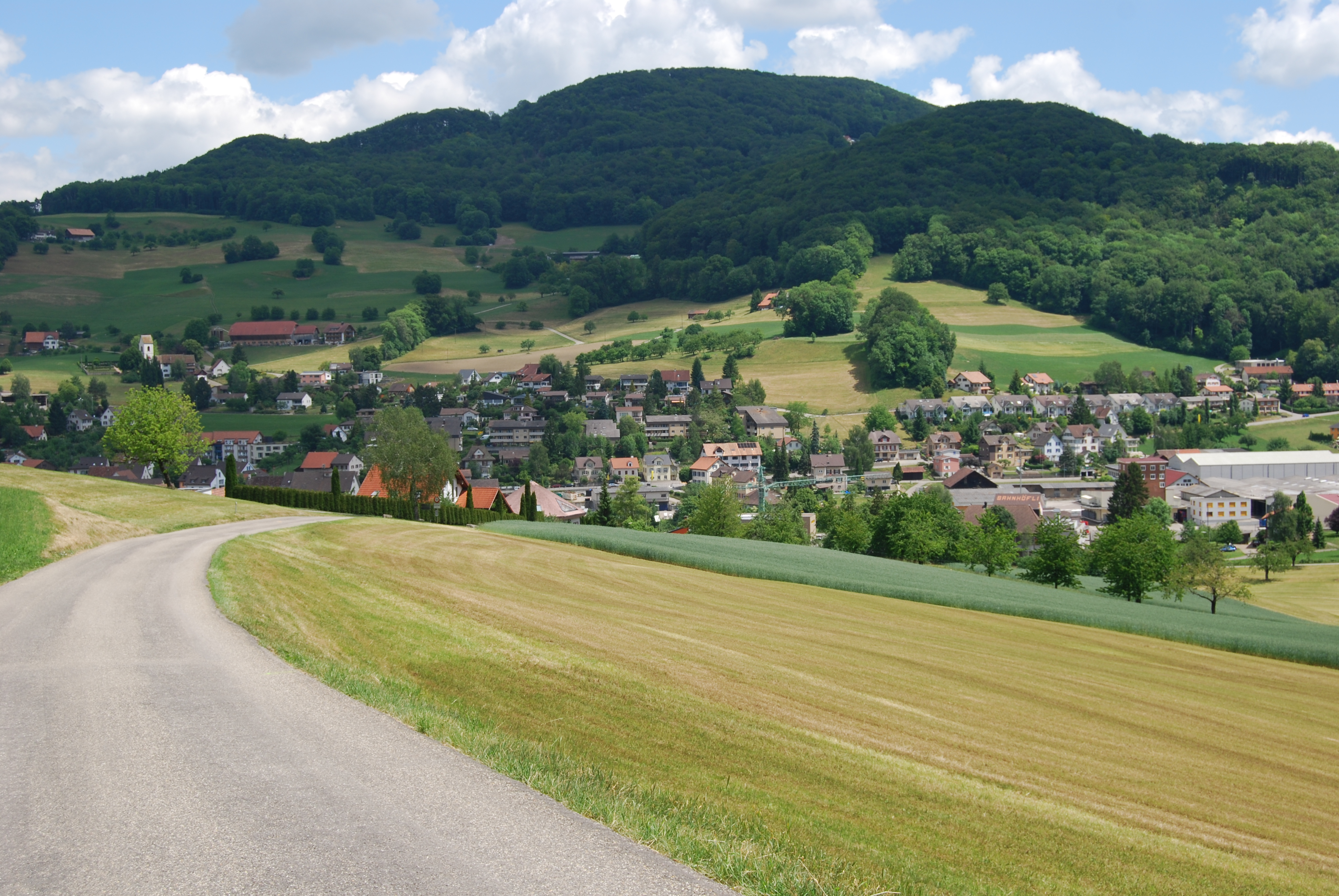

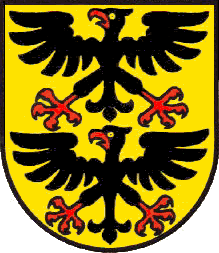
- Coat of arms
- Location of Läufelfingen
- Location within Switzerland Location within Canton of Basel-Landschaft
- Coordinates: 47°24′N 7°51′E
- Country: Switzerland
- Canton: Basel-Landschaft
- District: Sissach

Area
  - Total: 8.15 km^{2} (3.15 sq mi)
- Elevation: 560 m (1,840 ft)

Population (June 2021)
  - Total: 1,252
  - Density: 154/km^{2} (398/sq mi)
- Time zone: UTC+01:00 (CET)
  - Summer (DST): UTC+02:00 (CEST)
- Postal code: 4448
- SFOS number: 2852
- ISO 3166 code: CH-BL
- Surrounded by: Buckten, Diegten, Eptingen, Häfelfingen, Hauenstein-Ifenthal (SO), Känerkinden, Wisen (SO)
- Website: laeufelfingen.ch

Läufelfingen is a municipality in the district of Sissach in the canton of Basel-Country in Switzerland.

== History ==
Läufelfingen is first mentioned in 1226 as Leinvolvingen. In 1481 it was mentioned as Leiffeldingen.

== Geography ==
Aerial view (1953)

Läufelfingen has an area, as of 2009, of 8.15 square kilometers (3.15 sq mi). Of this area, 4 km^{2} (1.5 sq mi) or 49.1% is used for agricultural purposes, while 3.36 km^{2} (1.30 sq mi) or 41.2% is forested. Of the rest of the land, 0.79 km^{2} (0.31 sq mi) or 9.7% is settled (buildings or roads).

Of the built up area, industrial buildings made up 1.2% of the total area while housing and buildings made up 4.3% and transportation infrastructure made up 3.2%. Out of the forested land, 39.6% of the total land area is heavily forested and 1.6% is covered with orchards or small clusters of trees. Of the agricultural land, 14.5% is used for growing crops and 32.5% is pastures, while 2.1% is used for orchards or vine crops.

The municipality is located in the Sissach district, along the Homburger stream and along the road over the pass at Unteren Hauenstein. It consists of the haufendorf village (an irregular, unplanned and quite closely packed village, built around a central square) of Läufelfingen.

== Coat of arms ==
The blazon of the municipal coat of arms is Or, two Eagles displayed Sable, langued, beaked and membered Gules.

== Demographics ==
Läufelfingen has a population (as of June 2021) of 1,252. As of 2008, 9.5% of the population are resident foreign nationals. Over the last 10 years (1997–2007) the population has changed at a rate of 0.5%.

Most of the population (as of 2000) speaks German (1,167 or 93.3%), with Albanian being second most common (26 or 2.1%) and Italian language being third (20 or 1.6%). There are 6 people who speak French.

As of 2008, the gender distribution of the population was 49.5% male and 50.5% female. The population was made up of 1,136 Swiss citizens (89.4% of the population), and 134 non-Swiss residents (10.6%) Of the population in the municipality 472 or about 37.7% were born in Läufelfingen and lived there in 2000. There were 251 or 20.1% who were born in the same canton, while 369 or 29.5% were born somewhere else in Switzerland, and 144 or 11.5% were born outside of Switzerland.

In 2008 there were 10 live births to Swiss citizens and 4 births to non-Swiss citizens, and in same time span there were 16 deaths of Swiss citizens. Ignoring immigration and emigration, the population of Swiss citizens decreased by 6 while the foreign population increased by 4. There was 1 Swiss man who emigrated from Switzerland. At the same time, there were 5 non-Swiss men and 3 non-Swiss women who immigrated from another country to Switzerland. The total Swiss population change in 2008 (from all sources, including moves across municipal borders) was a decrease of 17 and the non-Swiss population increased by 8 people. This represents a population growth rate of -0.7%.

The age distribution, as of 2010, in Läufelfingen is; 89 children or 7.0% of the population are between 0 and 6 years old and 196 teenagers or 15.4% are between 7 and 19. Of the adult population, 125 people or 9.8% of the population are between 20 and 29 years old. 146 people or 11.5% are between 30 and 39, 225 people or 17.7% are between 40 and 49, and 266 people or 20.9% are between 50 and 64. The senior population distribution is 148 people or 11.7% of the population are between 65 and 79 years old and there are 75 people or 5.9% who are over 80.

As of 2000, there were 490 people who were single and never married in the municipality. There were 626 married individuals, 96 widows or widowers and 39 individuals who are divorced.

As of 2000 the average number of residents per living room was 0.55 which is about equal to the cantonal average of 0.56 per room. In this case, a room is defined as space of a housing unit of at least 4 m^{2} (43 sq ft) as normal bedrooms, dining rooms, living rooms, kitchens and habitable cellars and attics. About 63.8% of the total households were owner-occupied, or in other words did not pay rent (though they may have a mortgage or a rent-to-own agreement).

As of 2000, there were 483 private households in the municipality, and an average of 2.5 persons per household. There were 140 households that consist of only one person and 49 households with five or more people. Out of a total of 491 households that answered this question, 28.5% were households made up of just one person and 4 were adults who lived with their parents. Of the rest of the households, there are 154 married couples without children, 163 married couples with children There were 16 single parents with a child or children. There were 6 households that were made up unrelated people and 8 households that were made some sort of institution or another collective housing.

In 2000 there were 232 single-family homes (or 62.5% of the total) out of a total of 371 inhabited buildings. There were 60 multi-family buildings (16.2%), along with 55 multi-purpose buildings that were mostly used for housing (14.8%) and 24 other use buildings (commercial or industrial) that also had some housing (6.5%). Of the single-family homes 33 were built before 1919, while 48 were built between 1990 and 2000. The greatest number of single-family homes (46) were built between 1946 and 1960.

In 2000 there were 557 apartments in the municipality. The most common apartment size was 4 rooms of which there were 151. There were 19 single-room apartments and 239 apartments with five or more rooms. Of these apartments, a total of 475 apartments (85.3% of the total) were permanently occupied, while 35 apartments (6.3%) were seasonally occupied and 47 apartments (8.4%) were empty. As of 2007, the construction rate of new housing units was 3.2 new units per 1000 residents. As of 2000 the average price to rent a two-room apartment was about 629.00 CHF (US$500, £280, €400), a three-room apartment was about 839.00 CHF (US$670, £380, €540) and a four-room apartment cost an average of 998.00 CHF (US$800, £450, €640). The vacancy rate for the municipality, in 2008, was 0%.

The historical population is given in the following chart:

== Heritage sites of national significance ==
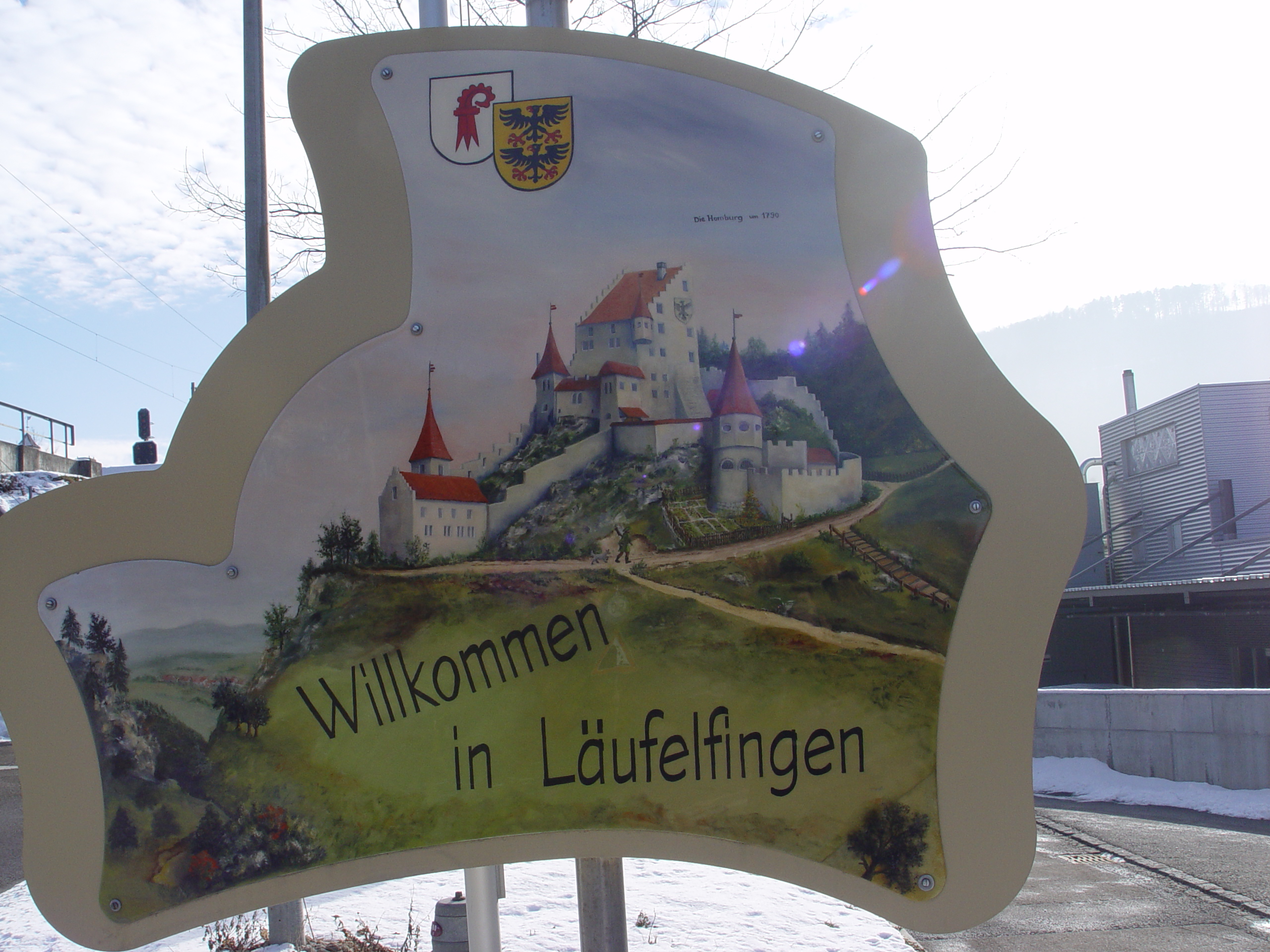
Picture of Neu-Homburg Castle as it appeared in 1798.

The Ruins of Neu-Homburg Castle are listed as a Swiss heritage site of national significance.

Homberg or Neu-Homberg Castle was the seat of the Froberg family since the 13th Century until it was destroyed in 1798.

== Politics ==
In the 2007 federal election the most popular party was the SVP which received 34.93% of the vote. The next three most popular parties were the SP (23.55%), the FDP (16.22%) and the Green Party (14.41%). In the federal election, a total of 466 votes were cast, and the voter turnout was 50.1%.

== Economy ==
As of 2007, Läufelfingen had an unemployment rate of 1.59%. As of 2005, there were 65 people employed in the primary economic sector and about 25 businesses involved in this sector. 117 people were employed in the secondary sector and there were 17 businesses in this sector. 298 people were employed in the tertiary sector, with 33 businesses in this sector. There were 627 residents of the municipality who were employed in some capacity, of which females made up 39.7% of the workforce.

In 2008 the total number of full-time equivalent jobs was 271. The number of jobs in the primary sector was 31, all of which were in agriculture. The number of jobs in the secondary sector was 79, of which 65 or (82.3%) were in manufacturing and 15 (19.0%) were in construction. The number of jobs in the tertiary sector was 161. In the tertiary sector; 27 or 16.8% were in wholesale or retail sales or the repair of motor vehicles, 31 or 19.3% were in the movement and storage of goods, 17 or 10.6% were in a hotel or restaurant, 1 or 0.6% were in the information industry, 2 or 1.2% were technical professionals or scientists, 9 or 5.6% were in education and 62 or 38.5% were in health care.

In 2000, there were 206 workers who commuted into the municipality and 419 workers who commuted away. The municipality is a net exporter of workers, with about 2.0 workers leaving the municipality for every one entering. About 5.8% of the workforce coming into Läufelfingen are coming from outside Switzerland. Of the working population, 19.8% used public transportation to get to work, and 46.9% used a private car.

== Religion ==
From the 2000 census, 215 or 17.2% were Roman Catholic, while 747 or 59.7% belonged to the Swiss Reformed Church. Of the rest of the population, there were 5 members of an Orthodox church (or about 0.40% of the population), and there were 41 individuals (or about 3.28% of the population) who belonged to another Christian church. There was 1 individual who was Jewish, and 58 (or about 4.64% of the population) who were Islamic. There was 1 person who was Buddhist and 2 individuals who belonged to another church. 156 (or about 12.47% of the population) belonged to no church, are agnostic or atheist, and 25 individuals (or about 2.00% of the population) did not answer the question.

== Transport ==
Läufelfingen sits on the Hauenstein line and is served by trains at Läufelfingen railway station.

== Education ==
In Läufelfingen about 531 or (42.4%) of the population have completed non-mandatory upper secondary education, and 118 or (9.4%) have completed additional higher education (either university or a Fachhochschule). Of the 118 who completed tertiary schooling, 72.0% were Swiss men, 20.3% were Swiss women, 5.1% were non-Swiss men.

As of 2000, there were 5 students in Läufelfingen who came from another municipality, while 96 residents attended schools outside the municipality.
