= Wenslingen =

- Municipality
- Coat of arms
- Location of Wenslingen
- Location within Switzerland Location within Canton of Basel-Landschaft
- Coordinates: 47°26′N 7°54′E
- Country: Switzerland
- Canton: Basel-Landschaft
- District: Sissach

Area
  - Total: 5.91 km^{2} (2.28 sq mi)
- Elevation: 571 m (1,873 ft)

Population (June 2021)
  - Total: 699
  - Density: 118/km^{2} (306/sq mi)
- Time zone: UTC+01:00 (CET)
  - Summer (DST): UTC+02:00 (CEST)
- Postal code: 4493
- SFOS number: 2865
- ISO 3166 code: CH-BL
- Surrounded by: Anwil, Kilchberg, Oltingen, Ormalingen, Rothenfluh, Tecknau, Zeglingen
- Website: www.wenslingen.ch

Wenslingen is a municipality in the district of Sissach in the canton of Basel-Country in Switzerland.

== Geography ==
Aerial view (1953)

Wenslingen has an area, as of 2009, of 5.91 square kilometers (2.28 sq mi). Of this area, 3.68 km^{2} (1.42 sq mi) or 62.3% is used for agricultural purposes, while 1.77 km^{2} (0.68 sq mi) or 29.9% is forested. Of the rest of the land, 0.39 km^{2} (0.15 sq mi) or 6.6% is settled (buildings or roads), 0.01 km^{2} (2.5 acres) or 0.2% is either rivers or lakes.

Of the built up area, housing and buildings made up 3.9% and transportation infrastructure made up 2.5%. Out of the forested land, all of the forested land area is covered with heavy forests. Of the agricultural land, 45.9% is used for growing crops and 14.2% is pastures, while 2.2% is used for orchards or vine crops. All the water in the municipality is flowing water.

== Coat of arms ==
The blazon of the municipal coat of arms is Per pale, Or, a Pine tree Vert issuant from a Base Sable, and Gules, a head of wheat Or.

== Demographics ==
Wenslingen has a population (as of June 2021) of 699. As of 2008, 5.3% of the population are resident foreign nationals. Over the last 10 years (1997–2007) the population has changed at a rate of 7.1%.

Most of the population (as of 2000) speaks German (643 or 98.2%), with French being second most common (3 or 0.5%) and Serbo-Croatian being third (2 or 0.3%).

As of 2008, the gender distribution of the population was 50.9% male and 49.1% female. The population was made up of 656 Swiss citizens (94.4% of the population), and 39 non-Swiss residents (5.6%) Of the population in the municipality 249 or about 38.0% were born in Wenslingen and lived there in 2000. There were 213 or 32.5% who were born in the same canton, while 137 or 20.9% were born somewhere else in Switzerland, and 29 or 4.4% were born outside of Switzerland.

In 2008 there were 9 live births to Swiss citizens and 1 birth to non-Swiss citizens, and in same time span there were 5 deaths of Swiss citizens. Ignoring immigration and emigration, the population of Swiss citizens increased by 4 while the foreign population increased by 1. There was 1 non-Swiss man who immigrated from another country to Switzerland. The total Swiss population change in 2008 (from all sources, including moves across municipal borders) was an increase of 5 and the non-Swiss population increased by 2 people. This represents a population growth rate of 1.0%.

The age distribution, as of 2010, in Wenslingen is; 48 children or 6.9% of the population are between 0 and 6 years old and 99 teenagers or 14.2% are between 7 and 19. Of the adult population, 57 people or 8.2% of the population are between 20 and 29 years old. 87 people or 12.5% are between 30 and 39, 138 people or 19.9% are between 40 and 49, and 145 people or 20.9% are between 50 and 64. The senior population distribution is 86 people or 12.4% of the population are between 65 and 79 years old and there are 35 people or 5.0% who are over 80.

As of 2000, there were 268 people who were single and never married in the municipality. There were 326 married individuals, 41 widows or widowers and 20 individuals who are divorced.

As of 2000, there were 256 private households in the municipality, and an average of 2.5 persons per household. There were 67 households that consist of only one person and 15 households with five or more people. Out of a total of 261 households that answered this question, 25.7% were households made up of just one person and 5 were adults who lived with their parents. Of the rest of the households, there are 75 married couples without children, 95 married couples with children There were 11 single parents with a child or children. There were 3 households that were made up unrelated people and 5 households that were made some sort of institution or another collective housing.

In 2000 there were 114 single family homes (or 58.5% of the total) out of a total of 195 inhabited buildings. There were 28 multi-family buildings (14.4%), along with 44 multi-purpose buildings that were mostly used for housing (22.6%) and 9 other use buildings (commercial or industrial) that also had some housing (4.6%). Of the single family homes 16 were built before 1919, while 38 were built between 1990 and 2000. The greatest number of single family homes (22) were built between 1981 and 1990.

In 2000 there were 270 apartments in the municipality. The most common apartment size was 4 rooms of which there were 68. There were 4 single room apartments and 119 apartments with five or more rooms. Of these apartments, a total of 249 apartments (92.2% of the total) were permanently occupied, while 11 apartments (4.1%) were seasonally occupied and 10 apartments (3.7%) were empty. As of 2009, the construction rate of new housing units was 10.1 new units per 1000 residents. As of 2000 the average price to rent a three-room apartment was about 1050.00 CHF (US$840, £470, €670) and a four-room apartment cost an average of 1275.00 CHF (US$1020, £570, €820). The vacancy rate for the municipality, in 2010, was 0.33%.

The historical population is given in the following chart:

== Sights ==
The entire village of Wenslingen is designated as part of the Inventory of Swiss Heritage Sites.

== Politics ==
In the 2007 federal election the most popular party was the SVP which received 45.34% of the vote. The next three most popular parties were the SP (15.74%), the Green Party (13.77%) and the FDP (12.37%). In the federal election, a total of 308 votes were cast, and the voter turnout was 58.8%.

== Economy ==
As of 2010, Wenslingen had an unemployment rate of 1.4%. As of 2008, there were 50 people employed in the primary economic sector and about 19 businesses involved in this sector. 33 people were employed in the secondary sector and there were 11 businesses in this sector. 78 people were employed in the tertiary sector, with 16 businesses in this sector. There were 351 residents of the municipality who were employed in some capacity, of which females made up 39.3% of the workforce.

In 2008 the total number of full-time equivalent jobs was 113. The number of jobs in the primary sector was 28, all of which were in agriculture. The number of jobs in the secondary sector was 31, of which 3 or (9.7%) were in manufacturing and 28 (90.3%) were in construction. The number of jobs in the tertiary sector was 54. In the tertiary sector; 5 or 9.3% were in wholesale or retail sales or the repair of motor vehicles, 4 or 7.4% were in the movement and storage of goods, 1 or 1.9% were in a hotel or restaurant, 4 or 7.4% were technical professionals or scientists, 12 or 22.2% were in education and 19 or 35.2% were in health care.

In 2000, there were 51 workers who commuted into the municipality and 249 workers who commuted away. The municipality is a net exporter of workers, with about 4.9 workers leaving the municipality for every one entering. Of the working population, 27.4% used public transportation to get to work, and 47.9% used a private car.

== Religion ==
From the 2000 census, 70 or 10.7% were Roman Catholic, while 468 or 71.5% belonged to the Swiss Reformed Church. Of the rest of the population, there was 1 member of an Orthodox church who belonged, there was 1 individual who belongs to the Christian Catholic Church, and there were 33 individuals (or about 5.04% of the population) who belonged to another Christian church. There were 3 (or about 0.46% of the population) who were Islamic. There were 2 individuals who were Buddhist. 56 (or about 8.55% of the population) belonged to no church, are agnostic or atheist, and 21 individuals (or about 3.21% of the population) did not answer the question.

== Education ==
In Wenslingen about 292 or (44.6%) of the population have completed non-mandatory upper secondary education, and 73 or (11.1%) have completed additional higher education (either university or a Fachhochschule). Of the 73 who completed tertiary schooling, 71.2% were Swiss men, 23.3% were Swiss women.

As of 2000, there were 57 students in Wenslingen who came from another municipality, while 41 residents attended schools outside the municipality.
