= Rünenberg =

- Municipality
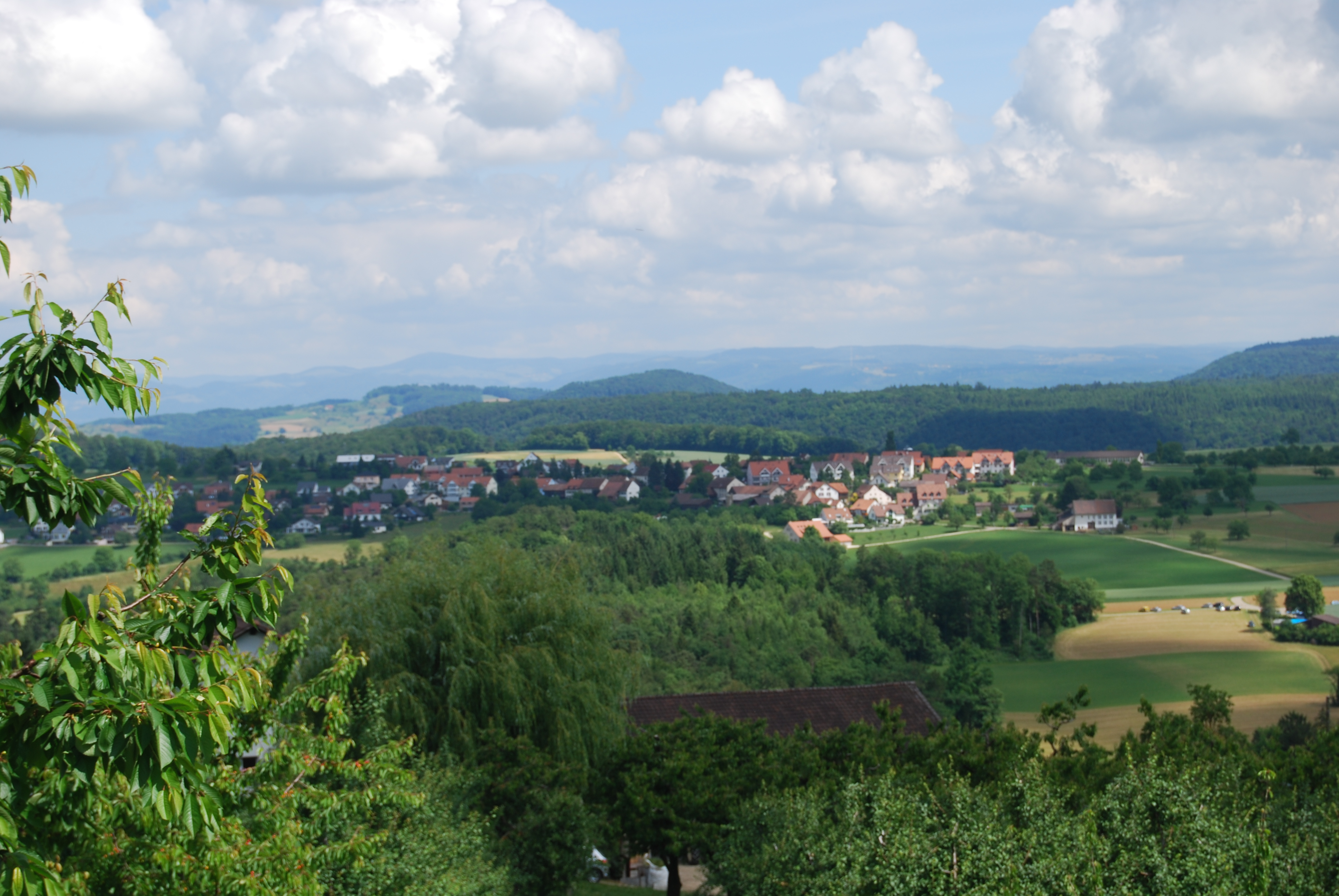

- Coat of arms
- Location of Rünenberg
- Location within Switzerland Location within Canton of Basel-Landschaft
- Coordinates: 47°26′N 7°53′E
- Country: Switzerland
- Canton: Basel-Landschaft
- District: Sissach

Area
  - Total: 4.98 km^{2} (1.92 sq mi)
- Elevation: 595 m (1,952 ft)

Population (June 2021)
  - Total: 748
  - Density: 150/km^{2} (389/sq mi)
- Time zone: UTC+01:00 (CET)
  - Summer (DST): UTC+02:00 (CEST)
- Postal code: 4497
- SFOS number: 2860
- ISO 3166 code: CH-BL
- Surrounded by: Gelterkinden, Häfelfingen, Kilchberg, Rümlingen, Tecknau, Zeglingen
- Website: www.ruenenberg.ch

Rünenberg is a municipality in the district of Sissach in the canton of Basel-Country in Switzerland.

== History ==
Rünenberg is first mentioned in 1101 as Runachperh.

It is the native place of:

- Johann August Sutter, pioneer of California
- Niklaus Riggenbach, inventor of the Riggenbach rack system

== Geography ==
Aerial view (1950)

Rünenberg has an area, as of 2009, of 4.98 km^{2} (1.92 sq mi). Of this area, 2.75 km^{2} (1.06 sq mi) or 55.2% is used for agricultural purposes, while 1.88 km^{2} (0.73 sq mi) or 37.8% is forested. Of the rest of the land, 0.34 km^{2} (0.13 sq mi) or 6.8% is settled (buildings or roads), 0.01 km^{2} (2.5 acres) or 0.2% is either rivers or lakes.

Of the built up area, housing and buildings made up 4.8% and transportation infrastructure made up 1.4%. Out of the forested land, 36.5% of the total land area is heavily forested and 1.2% is covered with orchards or small clusters of trees. Of the agricultural land, 36.1% is used for growing crops and 14.1% is pastures, while 5.0% is used for orchards or vine crops. All the water in the municipality is flowing water.

The municipality is located in the Sissach district, on a high plateau between the Homburger and Eital valleys. It consists of the linear village of Rünenberg.

== Coat of arms ==
The blazon of the municipal coat of arms is Azure, a Marguerite-flower Argent centered Or.

== Demographics ==
Rünenberg had a population (as of June 2021) of 748. As of 2008, 5.0% of the population were resident foreign nationals. Over the 10 years from 1997 to 2007, the population changed at a rate of 7.5%.

Most of the population (as of 2000) spoke German (690 or 97.9%), with French being second most common (4 or 0.6%) and Italian language being third (3 or 0.4%). There was 1 person who spoke Romansh.

As of 2008, the gender distribution of the population was 50.3% male and 49.7% female. The population was made up of 754 Swiss citizens (95.2% of the population), and 38 non-Swiss residents (4.8%) Of the population in the municipality 253 or about 35.9% were born in Rünenberg and lived there in 2000. There were 213 or 30.2% who were born in the same canton, while 172 or 24.4% were born somewhere else in Switzerland, and 60 or 8.5% were born outside of Switzerland.

In 2008 there were 8 live births to Swiss citizens and 4 deaths of Swiss citizens. Ignoring immigration and emigration, the population of Swiss citizens increased by 4 while the foreign population remained the same. There was 1 Swiss woman who emigrated from Switzerland. The total Swiss population change in 2008 (from all sources, including moves across municipal borders) was an increase of 10, and the non-Swiss population increased by 4 people. This represented a population growth rate of 1.8%.

The age distribution, as of 2010, in Rünenberg was: 51 children or 6.4% of the population were between 0 and 6 years old, and 119 teenagers or 15.0% were between 7 and 19. Of the adult population, 75 people or 9.5% of the population were between 20 and 29 years old. 85 people or 10.7% were between 30 and 39, 126 people or 15.9% were between 40 and 49, and 198 people or 25.0% were between 50 and 64. The senior population distribution was 106 people or 13.4% of the population were between 65 and 79 years old and there were 32 people or 4.0% who were over 80.

As of 2000, there were 271 people who were single and never married in the municipality. There were 380 married individuals, 40 widows or widowers and 14 individuals who were divorced.

As of 2000, there were 275 private households in the municipality, and an average of 2.6 persons per household. There were 60 households that consist of only one person and 13 households with five or more people. Out of a total of 278 households that answered this question, 21.6% were households made up of just one person and 3 were adults who lived with their parents. Of the rest of the households, there were 88 married couples without children, and 114 married couples with children. There were 8 single parents with a child or children. There were 2 households that were made up unrelated people and 3 households that were made some sort of institution or another collective housing.

In 2000 there were 134 single family homes (or 62.3% of the total) out of a total of 215 inhabited buildings. There were 28 multi-family buildings (13.0%), along with 44 multi-purpose buildings that were mostly used for housing (20.5%) and 9 other use buildings (commercial or industrial) that also had some housing (4.2%). Of the single family homes 25 were built before 1919, while 42 were built between 1990 and 2000. The greatest number of single family homes (27) were built between 1971 and 1980.

In 2000 there were 296 apartments in the municipality. The most common apartment size was 4 rooms of which there were 94. There were 2 single room apartments and 115 apartments with five or more rooms. Of these apartments, a total of 274 apartments (92.6% of the total) were permanently occupied, while 10 apartments (3.4%) were seasonally occupied and 12 apartments (4.1%) were empty. As of 2007, the construction rate of new housing units was 7.8 new units per 1000 residents. As of 2000 the average price to rent a three-room apartment was about 751.00 CHF (US$600, £340, €480) and a four-room apartment cost an average of 1031.00 CHF (US$820, £460, €660). The vacancy rate for the municipality, in 2008, was 0.31%.

The historical population is given in the following chart:

== Politics ==
In the 2007 federal election the most popular party was the SVP which received 39.66% of the vote. The next three most popular parties were the SP (21.76%), the Green Party (17.54%) and the FDP (15.11%). In the federal election, a total of 329 votes were cast, and the voter turnout was 54.8%.

== Economy ==
As of 2007, Rünenberg had an unemployment rate of 1.11%. As of 2005, there were 33 people employed in the primary economic sector and about 13 businesses involved in this sector. 59 people were employed in the secondary sector and there were 9 businesses in this sector. 44 people were employed in the tertiary sector, with 15 businesses in this sector. There were 388 residents of the municipality who were employed in some capacity, of which females made up 40.5% of the workforce.

In 2008 the total number of full-time equivalent jobs was 110. The number of jobs in the primary sector was 23, of which 20 were in agriculture and 3 were in forestry or lumber production. The number of jobs in the secondary sector was 52, of which 40 or (76.9%) were in manufacturing and 12 (23.1%) were in construction. The number of jobs in the tertiary sector was 35. In the tertiary sector; 4 or 11.4% were in wholesale or retail sales or the repair of motor vehicles, 6 or 17.1% were in the movement and storage of goods, 2 or 5.7% were in a hotel or restaurant, 12 or 34.3% were technical professionals or scientists, 6 or 17.1% were in education.

In 2000, there were 48 workers who commuted into the municipality and 301 workers who commuted away. The municipality is a net exporter of workers, with about 6.3 workers leaving the municipality for every one entering. About 10.4% of the workforce coming into Rünenberg are coming from outside Switzerland. Of the working population, 20.1% used public transportation to get to work, and 55.4% used a private car.

== Religion ==
From the 2000 census, 103 or 14.6% were Roman Catholic, while 479 or 67.9% belonged to the Swiss Reformed Church. Of the rest of the population, there were 2 individuals (or about 0.28% of the population) who belonged to the Christian Catholic Church, and there was 1 individual who belongs to another Christian church. There were 5 (or about 0.71% of the population) who were Islamic. There was 1 person who was Buddhist. 106 (or about 15.04% of the population) belonged to no church, are agnostic or atheist, and 8 individuals (or about 1.13% of the population) did not answer the question.

== Climate ==
Rünenberg has an average of 127.6 days of rain or snow per year and on average receives 972 mm (38.3 in) of precipitation. The wettest month is May during which time Rünenberg receives an average of 111 mm (4.4 in) of rain or snow. During this month there is precipitation for an average of 12.0 days. The driest month of the year is February with an average of 49 mm (1.9 in) of precipitation over 8.7 days. Climate in this area has mild differences between highs and lows, and there is adequate rainfall year-round. The Köppen Climate Classification subtype for this climate is "Cfb" (Marine West Coast Climate/Oceanic climate).

Climate data for Rünenberg, elevation 611 m (2,005 ft), (1991–2020)
Month	Jan	Feb	Mar	Apr	May	Jun	Jul	Aug	Sep	Oct	Nov	Dec	Year
Mean daily maximum °C (°F)	3.5 (38.3)	4.9 (40.8)	9.4 (48.9)	13.6 (56.5)	17.5 (63.5)	21.1 (70.0)	23.3 (73.9)	22.9 (73.2)	18.3 (64.9)	13.4 (56.1)	7.6 (45.7)	4.4 (39.9)	13.3 (55.9)
Daily mean °C (°F)	1.0 (33.8)	1.8 (35.2)	5.5 (41.9)	9.2 (48.6)	13.0 (55.4)	16.6 (61.9)	18.6 (65.5)	18.3 (64.9)	14.2 (57.6)	10.0 (50.0)	4.9 (40.8)	1.8 (35.2)	9.6 (49.3)
Mean daily minimum °C (°F)	−1.5 (29.3)	−1.1 (30.0)	2.0 (35.6)	5.1 (41.2)	8.8 (47.8)	12.4 (54.3)	14.2 (57.6)	14.2 (57.6)	10.6 (51.1)	7.0 (44.6)	2.4 (36.3)	−0.6 (30.9)	6.1 (43.0)
Average precipitation mm (inches)	54.5 (2.15)	49.1 (1.93)	58.3 (2.30)	74.4 (2.93)	111.2 (4.38)	101.1 (3.98)	108.3 (4.26)	108.1 (4.26)	82.3 (3.24)	78.7 (3.10)	73.4 (2.89)	72.2 (2.84)	971.6 (38.25)
Average precipitation days (≥ 1.0 mm)	9.8	8.7	9.9	10.6	12.0	11.6	11.9	11.5	9.1	10.7	10.4	11.4	127.6
Average relative humidity (%)	81	76	70	67	71	71	69	71	76	81	83	82	75
Mean monthly sunshine hours	64.0	85.8	136.7	169.2	187.3	210.3	231.5	213.9	159.4	103.6	65.2	55.2	1,682.1
Percentage possible sunshine	26	33	41	45	43	47	52	53	47	35	26	24	41
Source 1: NOAA
Source 2: MeteoSwiss

== Education ==
In Rünenberg about 347 or (49.2%) of the population have completed non-mandatory upper secondary education, and 73 or (10.4%) have completed additional higher education (either university or a Fachhochschule). Of the 73 who completed tertiary schooling, 72.6% were Swiss men, 20.5% were Swiss women, 6.8% were non-Swiss men.

As of 2000, there were 48 students from Rünenberg who attended schools outside the municipality.
