= Häfelfingen =

- Municipality
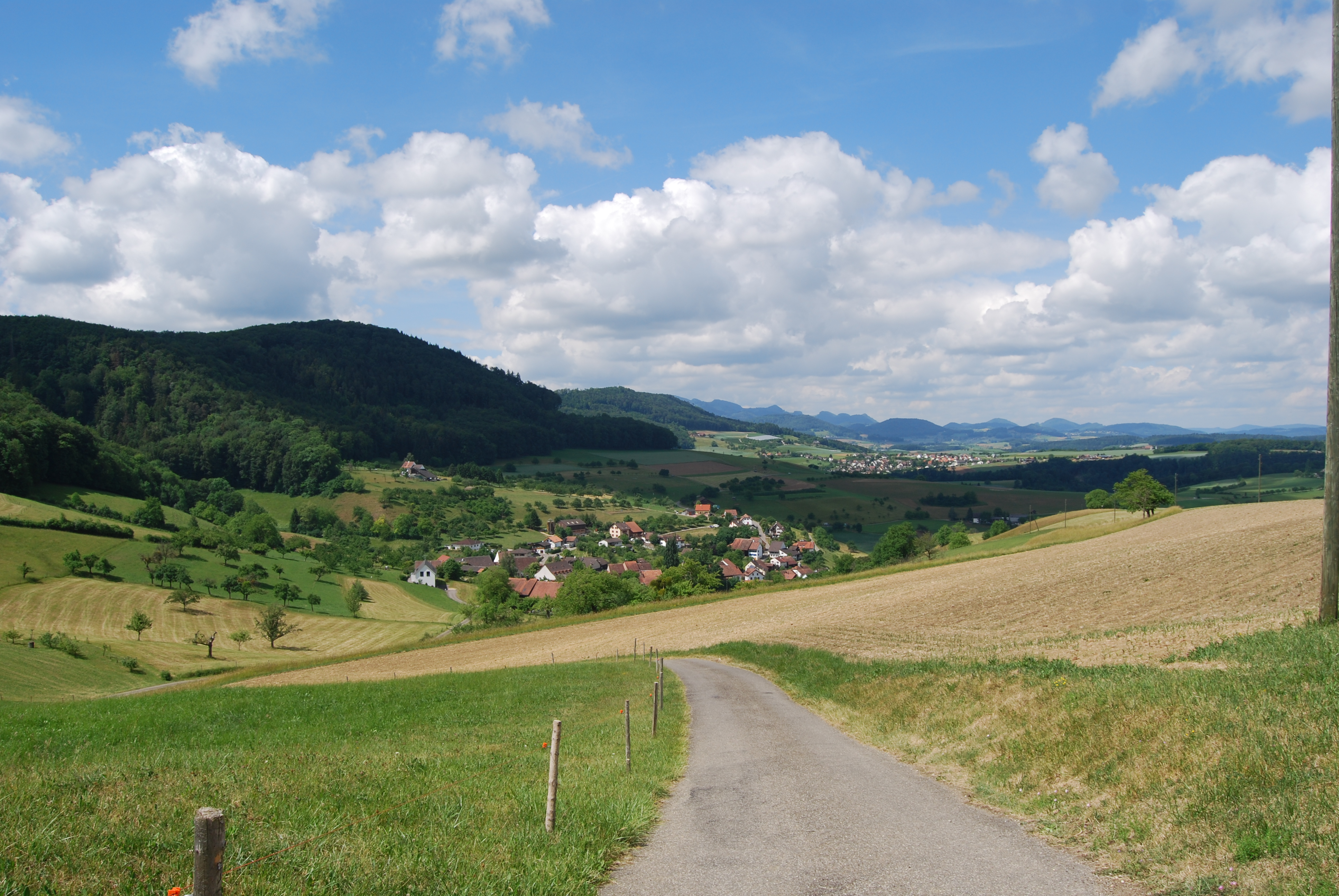

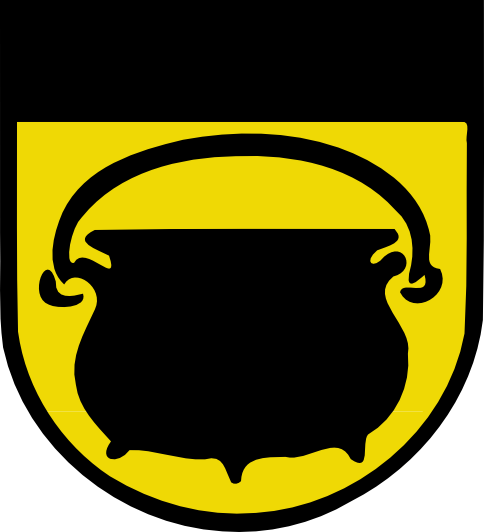
- Coat of arms
- Location of Häfelfingen
- Location within Switzerland Location within Canton of Basel-Landschaft
- Coordinates: 47°25′N 7°52′E
- Country: Switzerland
- Canton: Basel-Landschaft
- District: Sissach

Area
  - Total: 3.96 km^{2} (1.53 sq mi)
- Elevation: 555 m (1,821 ft)

Population (June 2021)
  - Total: 256
  - Density: 64.6/km^{2} (167/sq mi)
- Time zone: UTC+01:00 (CET)
  - Summer (DST): UTC+02:00 (CEST)
- Postal code: 4445
- SFOS number: 2847
- ISO 3166 code: CH-BL
- Surrounded by: Buckten, Läufelfingen, Rümlingen, Rünenberg, Wisen (SO), Zeglingen
- Website: http://www.haefelfingen.ch SFSO statistics

Häfelfingen is a municipality in the district of Sissach in the canton of Basel-Country in Switzerland.

== History ==
Häfelfingen is first mentioned in 1358 as Hevelingen.

== Geography ==
Aerial view from 3000 m by Walter Mittelholzer (1920)

Häfelfingen has an area, as of 2009, of 3.96 square kilometers (1.53 sq mi). Of this area, 2.32 km^{2} (0.90 sq mi) or 58.6% is used for agricultural purposes, while 1.37 km^{2} (0.53 sq mi) or 34.6% is forested. Of the rest of the land, 0.25 km^{2} (0.097 sq mi) or 6.3% is settled (buildings or roads).

Of the built up area, housing and buildings made up 4.0% and transportation infrastructure made up 1.5%. Out of the forested land, 32.6% of the total land area is heavily forested and 2.0% is covered with orchards or small clusters of trees. Of the agricultural land, 19.7% is used for growing crops and 32.3% is pastures, while 6.6% is used for orchards or vine crops.

The municipality is located in the Sissach district, in a side valley off the Homburger valley. It consists of the village of Häfelfingen and eleven scattered houses or small settlements.

== Coat of arms ==
The blazon of the municipal coat of arms is Or, a Cauldron Sable, in chief Sable.

== Demographics ==
Häfelfingen has a population (as of June 2021) of 256. As of 2008, 4.5% of the population are resident foreign nationals. Over the last 10 years (1997–2007) the population has changed at a rate of 5.5%.

Most of the population (as of 2000) speaks German (245 or 91.4%), with Mazedonisch being second most common (7 or 2.6%) and Spanish being third (4 or 1.5%). There is 1 person who speaks French.

As of 2008, the gender distribution of the population was 51.1% male and 48.9% female. The population was made up of 256 Swiss citizens (94.8% of the population), and 14 non-Swiss residents (5.2%) Of the population in the municipality 101 or about 37.7% were born in Häfelfingen and lived there in 2000. There were 81 or 30.2% who were born in the same canton, while 53 or 19.8% were born somewhere else in Switzerland, and 31 or 11.6% were born outside of Switzerland.

In 2008 there were 2 live births to Swiss citizens and 1 death of a Swiss citizen. Ignoring immigration and emigration, the population of Swiss citizens increased by 1 while the foreign population remained the same. There was 1 Swiss man and 1 Swiss woman who emigrated from Switzerland. At the same time, there were 3 non-Swiss men who immigrated from another country to Switzerland. The total Swiss population change in 2008 (from all sources, including moves across municipal borders) was a decrease of 2 and the non-Swiss population increased by 1 people. This represents a population growth rate of -0.4%.

The age distribution, as of 2010, in Häfelfingen is; 14 children or 5.2% of the population are between 0 and 6 years old and 55 teenagers or 20.4% are between 7 and 19. Of the adult population, 28 people or 10.4% of the population are between 20 and 29 years old. 21 people or 7.8% are between 30 and 39, 66 people or 24.4% are between 40 and 49, and 42 people or 15.6% are between 50 and 64. The senior population distribution is 32 people or 11.9% of the population are between 65 and 79 years old and there are 12 people or 4.4% who are over 80.

As of 2000, there were 112 people who were single and never married in the municipality. There were 136 married individuals, 7 widows or widowers and 13 individuals who are divorced.

As of 2000, there were 92 private households in the municipality, and an average of 2.8 persons per household. There were 11 households that consist of only one person and 10 households with five or more people. Out of a total of 93 households that answered this question, 11.8% were households made up of just one person and 1 were adults who lived with their parents. Of the rest of the households, there are 33 married couples without children, 39 married couples with children There were 7 single parents with a child or children. There was 1 household that was made up unrelated people and 1 household that was made some sort of institution or another collective housing.

In 2000 there were 43 single-family homes (or 58.9% of the total) out of a total of 73 inhabited buildings. There were 6 multi-family buildings (8.2%), along with 20 multi-purpose buildings that were mostly used for housing (27.4%) and 4 other use buildings (commercial or industrial) that also had some housing (5.5%). Of the single-family homes 11 were built before 1919, while 2 were built between 1990 and 2000. The greatest number of single-family homes (12) were built between 1971 and 1980.

In 2000 there were 95 apartments in the municipality. The most common apartment size was 4 rooms of which there were 31. There were single-room apartments and 44 apartments with five or more rooms. Of these apartments, a total of 90 apartments (94.7% of the total) were permanently occupied, while 5 apartments (5.3%) were seasonally occupied. As of 2007, the construction rate of new housing units was 0 new units per 1000 residents. As of 2000 the average price to rent a two-room apartment was about .00 CHF (US$0, £0, €0), a three-room apartment was about .00 CHF (US$0, £0, €0) and a four-room apartment cost an average of 984.00 CHF (US$790, £440, €630). The vacancy rate for the municipality, in 2008, was 0%.

The historical population is given in the following chart:

== Politics ==
In the 2007 federal election the most popular party was the SVP which received 39.3% of the vote. The next three most popular parties were the Green Party (25.07%), the SP (13.84%) and the FDP (11.36%). In the federal election, a total of 114 votes were cast, and the voter turnout was 58.5%.

== Economy ==
As of 2007, Häfelfingen had an unemployment rate of 1.02%. As of 2005, there were 33 people employed in the primary economic sector and about 12 businesses involved in this sector. 5 people were employed in the secondary sector and there were 3 businesses in this sector. 68 people were employed in the tertiary sector, with 6 businesses in this sector. There were 130 residents of the municipality who were employed in some capacity, of which females made up 43.1% of the workforce.

In 2008 the total number of full-time equivalent jobs was 89. The number of jobs in the primary sector was 23, all of which were in agriculture. The number of jobs in the secondary sector was 7, of which or (0.0%) were in manufacturing and 7 (100.0%) were in construction. The number of jobs in the tertiary sector was 59. In the tertiary sector; 1 or 1.7% were in wholesale or retail sales or the repair of motor vehicles, 1 or 1.7% were in the movement and storage of goods, 54 or 91.5% were in a hotel or restaurant, 1 or 1.7% were technical professionals or scientists, 2 or 3.4% were in education and 1 or 1.7% were in health care.

In 2000, there were 40 workers who commuted into the municipality and 78 workers who commuted away. The municipality is a net exporter of workers, with about 2.0 workers leaving the municipality for every one entering. Of the working population, 10.8% used public transportation to get to work, and 45.4% used a private car.

== Religion ==
From the 2000 census, 19 or 7.1% were Roman Catholic, while 179 or 66.8% belonged to the Swiss Reformed Church. Of the rest of the population, there were 12 members of an Orthodox church (or about 4.48% of the population), and there were 15 individuals (or about 5.60% of the population) who belonged to another Christian church. There were 5 (or about 1.87% of the population) who were Islamic. There was 1 person who was Buddhist. 37 (or about 13.81% of the population) belonged to no church, are agnostic or atheist.

== Education ==
In Häfelfingen about 103 or (38.4%) of the population have completed non-mandatory upper secondary education, and 34 or (12.7%) have completed additional higher education (either university or a Fachhochschule). Of the 34 who completed tertiary schooling, 70.6% were Swiss men, 20.6% were Swiss women.

As of 2000, there were 8 students in Häfelfingen who came from another municipality, while 35 residents attended schools outside the municipality.
