= Oltingen =

Oltingen, Switzerland
- Municipality
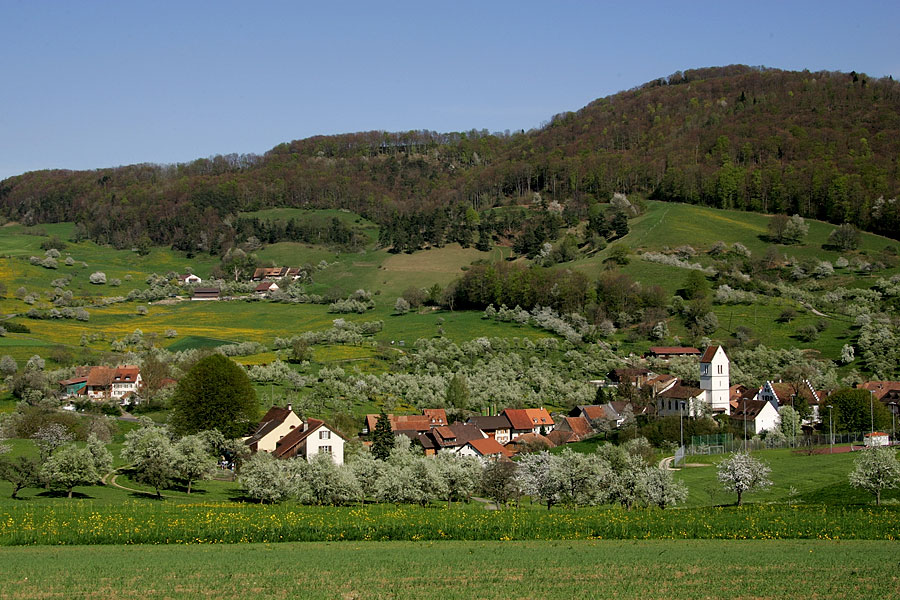

- Coat of arms
- Location of Oltingen, Switzerland
- Location within Switzerland Location within Canton of Basel-Landschaft
- Coordinates: 47°26′N 7°56′E
- Country: Switzerland
- Canton: Basel-Landschaft
- District: Sissach

Area
  - Total: 7.18 km^{2} (2.77 sq mi)
- Elevation: 576 m (1,890 ft)

Population (June 2021)
  - Total: 511
  - Density: 71.2/km^{2} (184/sq mi)
- Time zone: UTC+01:00 (CET)
  - Summer (DST): UTC+02:00 (CEST)
- Postal code: 4494
- SFOS number: 2855
- ISO 3166 code: CH-BL
- Surrounded by: Anwil, Kienberg (SO), Obererlinsbach (SO), Rohr (SO), Rothenfluh, Wenslingen, Zeglingen
- Website: https://kanton.baselland.ch/gemeinden/oltingen SFSO statistics

Oltingen is a municipality in the district of Sissach in the canton of Basel-Country in Switzerland.

== History ==
Oltingen is first mentioned in 1244.

== Geography ==
Aerial view (1953)

Oltingen has an area, as of 2009, of 7.18 square kilometers (2.77 sq mi). Of this area, 4.3 km^{2} (1.7 sq mi) or 59.9% is used for agricultural purposes, while 2.43 km^{2} (0.94 sq mi) or 33.8% is forested. Of the rest of the land, 0.42 km^{2} (0.16 sq mi) or 5.8% is settled (buildings or roads) and 0.02 km^{2} (4.9 acres) or 0.3% is unproductive land.

Of the built up area, housing and buildings made up 2.4% and transportation infrastructure made up 3.2%. Out of the forested land, 31.8% of the total land area is heavily forested and 2.1% is covered with orchards or small clusters of trees. Of the agricultural land, 22.8% is used for growing crops and 31.9% is pastures, while 5.2% is used for orchards or vine crops.

The municipality is located in the Sissach district, at the foot of the old road over the Schafmatt pass.

== Coat of arms ==
The blazon of the municipal coat of arms is Or, on a Bend Sable three Horse-shoes Argent.

== Demographics ==
Oltingen has a population (as of June 2021) of 511. As of 2008, 5.5% of the population are resident foreign nationals. Over the last 10 years (1997–2007) the population has changed at a rate of 0.7%.

Most of the population (as of 2000) speaks German (388 or 95.8%), with Spanish being second most common (5 or 1.2%). There is 1 person who speaks French.

As of 2008, the gender distribution of the population was 48.0% male and 52.0% female. The population was made up of 414 Swiss citizens (95.2% of the population), and 21 non-Swiss residents (4.8%) Of the population in the municipality 207 or about 51.1% were born in Oltingen and lived there in 2000. There were 98 or 24.2% who were born in the same canton, while 65 or 16.0% were born somewhere else in Switzerland, and 32 or 7.9% were born outside of Switzerland.

In 2008 there were 2 live births to Swiss citizens and were 4 deaths of Swiss citizens. Ignoring immigration and emigration, the population of Swiss citizens decreased by 2 while the foreign population remained the same. There were 3 Swiss men and 2 Swiss women who immigrated back to Switzerland. The total Swiss population change in 2008 (from all sources, including moves across municipal borders) was an increase of 5 and the non-Swiss population decreased by 3 people. This represents a population growth rate of 0.5%.

The age distribution, as of 2010, in Oltingen is; 33 children or 7.6% of the population are between 0 and 6 years old and 64 teenagers or 14.7% are between 7 and 19. Of the adult population, 47 people or 10.8% of the population are between 20 and 29 years old. 55 people or 12.6% are between 30 and 39, 73 people or 16.8% are between 40 and 49, and 94 people or 21.6% are between 50 and 64. The senior population distribution is 42 people or 9.7% of the population are between 65 and 79 years old and there are 27 people or 6.2% who are over 80.

As of 2000, there were 171 people who were single and never married in the municipality. There were 200 married individuals, 22 widows or widowers and 12 individuals who are divorced.

As of 2000, there were 158 private households in the municipality, and an average of 2.6 persons per household. There were 41 households that consist of only one person and 14 households with five or more people. Out of a total of 159 households that answered this question, 25.8% were households made up of just one person and 1 were adults who lived with their parents. Of the rest of the households, there are 45 married couples without children, 64 married couples with children There were 5 single parents with a child or children. There were 2 households that were made up unrelated people and 1 household that was made some sort of institution or another collective housing.

In 2000 there were 55 single family homes (or 48.7% of the total) out of a total of 113 inhabited buildings. There were 20 multi-family buildings (17.7%), along with 35 multi-purpose buildings that were mostly used for housing (31.0%) and 3 other use buildings (commercial or industrial) that also had some housing (2.7%). Of the single family homes 19 were built before 1919, while 9 were built between 1990 and 2000.

In 2000 there were 173 apartments in the municipality. The most common apartment size was 4 rooms of which there were 48. There were 3 single room apartments and 61 apartments with five or more rooms. Of these apartments, a total of 155 apartments (89.6% of the total) were permanently occupied, while 12 apartments (6.9%) were seasonally occupied and 6 apartments (3.5%) were empty. As of 2007, the construction rate of new housing units was 0 new units per 1000 residents. As of 2000 the average price to rent a two-room apartment was about .00 CHF (US$0, £0, €0), a three-room apartment was about 671.00 CHF (US$540, £300, €430) and a four-room apartment cost an average of 1154.00 CHF (US$920, £520, €740). The vacancy rate for the municipality, in 2008, was 0%.

The historical population is given in the following chart:

== Heritage sites of national significance ==
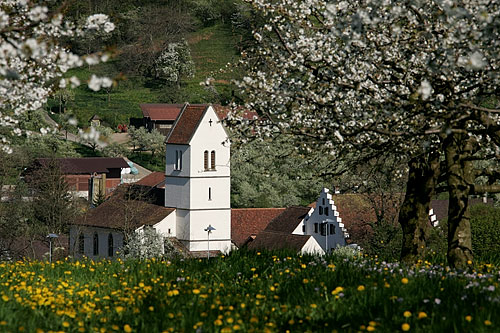
Reformed parish church of St. Niklaus

The Reformed parish church of St. Niklaus and the house (known as Grosses Haus) at Hauptstrasse 54 are listed as Swiss heritage site of national significance. The entire village of Oltingen is part of the Inventory of Swiss Heritage Sites.

The Church of St. Niklaus is located outside and slightly above the village of Oltingen. The church is surrounded by a low wall, which encloses the church, rectory, barns and an ossuary. The church was built in 1474. In 1852, the nave was widened toward the north. The interior of the church is decorated with a series of late-gothic murals. The murals include images of Marian legends, the Last Judgement, Apostles and Saints.

== Politics ==
In the 2007 federal election the most popular party was the SVP which received 33.1% of the vote. The next three most popular parties were the SP (22.65%), the Green Party (22.56%) and the FDP (10.89%). In the federal election, a total of 165 votes were cast, and the voter turnout was 52.1%.

== Economy ==
As of 2007, Oltingen had an unemployment rate of 1.07%. As of 2005, there were 72 people employed in the primary economic sector and about 23 businesses involved in this sector. 11 people were employed in the secondary sector and there were 5 businesses in this sector. 21 people were employed in the tertiary sector, with 10 businesses in this sector. There were 223 residents of the municipality who were employed in some capacity, of which females made up 42.6% of the workforce. In 2008 the total number of full-time equivalent jobs was 68. The number of jobs in the primary sector was 36, of which 35 were in agriculture and 1 was in forestry or lumber production. The number of jobs in the secondary sector was 13, of which 1 or (7.7%) were in manufacturing and 10 (76.9%) were in construction. The number of jobs in the tertiary sector was 19. In the tertiary sector; 5 or 26.3% were in wholesale or retail sales or the repair of motor vehicles, 4 or 21.1% were in a hotel or restaurant, 1 or 5.3% were in the information industry, 3 or 15.8% were technical professionals or scientists, 4 or 21.1% were in education.

In 2000, there were 18 workers who commuted into the municipality and 151 workers who commuted away. The municipality is a net exporter of workers, with about 8.4 workers leaving the municipality for every one entering. Of the working population, 23.8% used public transportation to get to work, and 40.8% used a private car.

== Religion ==
From the 2000 census, 31 or 7.7% were Roman Catholic, while 300 or 74.1% belonged to the Swiss Reformed Church. Of the rest of the population, there were 2 individuals (or about 0.49% of the population) who belonged to the Christian Catholic Church, and there were 2 individuals (or about 0.49% of the population) who belonged to another Christian church. There were 10 (or about 2.47% of the population) who were Islamic. 57 (or about 14.07% of the population) belonged to no church, are agnostic or atheist, and 3 individuals (or about 0.74% of the population) did not answer the question.

== Education ==
In Oltingen about 165 or (40.7%) of the population have completed non-mandatory upper secondary education, and 49 or (12.1%) have completed additional higher education (either university or a Fachhochschule). Of the 49 who completed tertiary schooling, 55.1% were Swiss men, 36.7% were Swiss women.

As of 2000, there were 27 students from Oltingen who attended schools outside the municipality.
