= Kilchberg, Basel-Landschaft =

Kilchberg
- Municipality
- Coat of arms
- Location of Kilchberg
- Location within Switzerland Location within Canton of Basel-Landschaft
- Coordinates: 47°26′N 7°54′E
- Country: Switzerland
- Canton: Basel-Landschaft
- District: Sissach

Area
  - Total: 1.59 km^{2} (0.61 sq mi)
- Elevation: 571 m (1,873 ft)

Population (June 2021)
  - Total: 165
  - Density: 104/km^{2} (269/sq mi)
- Time zone: UTC+01:00 (CET)
  - Summer (DST): UTC+02:00 (CEST)
- Postal code: 4496
- SFOS number: 2851
- ISO 3166 code: CH-BL
- Surrounded by: Rünenberg, Tecknau, Wenslingen, Zeglingen
- Website: kilchberg.bl.ch

Kilchberg is a municipality in the district of Sissach in the canton of Basel-Country in Switzerland.

== History ==
Kilchberg is first mentioned in 1226 as Chilhperc.

== Geography ==
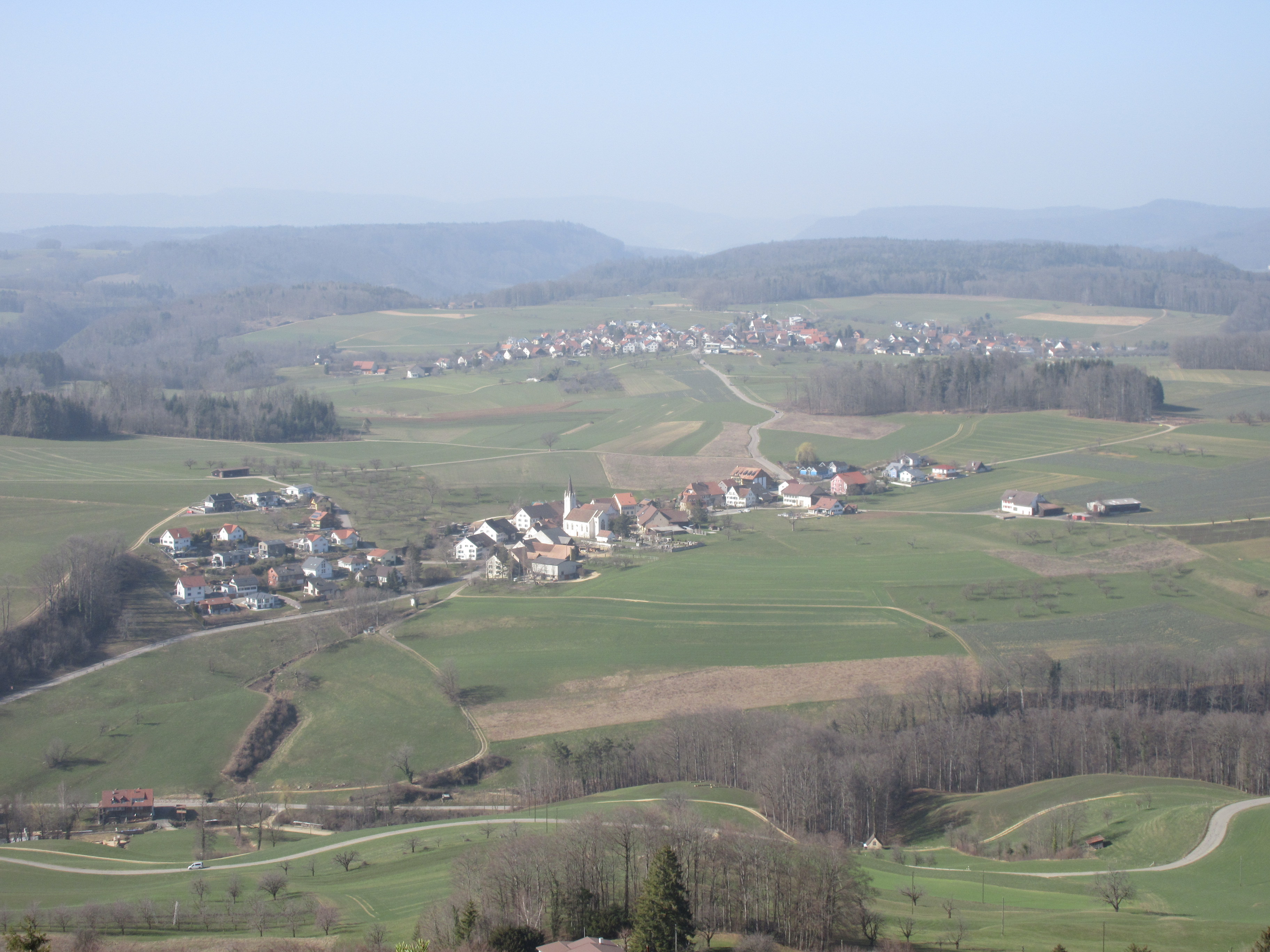
Kilchberg, view from the nearby Zigflue viewpoint

Kilchberg has an area, as of 2009, of 1.59 square kilometers (0.61 sq mi). Of this area, 1.13 km^{2} (0.44 sq mi) or 71.1% is used for agricultural purposes, while 0.33 km^{2} (0.13 sq mi) or 20.8% is forested. Of the rest of the land, 0.14 km^{2} (35 acres) or 8.8% is settled (buildings or roads).

Of the built up area, housing and buildings made up 1.9% and transportation infrastructure made up 5.7%. Out of the forested land, all of the forested land area is covered with heavy forests. Of the agricultural land, 45.3% is used for growing crops and 19.5% is pastures, while 6.3% is used for orchards or vine crops.

The municipality is located in the Sissach district, in a high valley along the upper Eital river. It consists of the linear village of Kilchberg.

== Coat of arms ==
The blazon of the municipal coat of arms is Argent, a Bendlet sable, in base two Bends sinister of the same.

== Demographics ==
Kilchberg has a population (as of June 2021) of 165. As of 2008, 2.3% of the population are resident foreign nationals. Over the last 10 years (1997–2007) the population has changed at a rate of 44.6%.

Most of the population (as of 2000) speaks German (104 or 95.4%) with the rest speaking French

As of 2008, the gender distribution of the population was 50.4% male and 49.6% female. The population was made up of 123 Swiss citizens (96.9% of the population), and 4 non-Swiss residents (3.1%) Of the population in the municipality 35 or about 32.1% were born in Kilchberg and lived there in 2000. There were 34 or 31.2% who were born in the same canton, while 31 or 28.4% were born somewhere else in Switzerland, and 6 or 5.5% were born outside of Switzerland.

In 2008 there was 1 live birth to Swiss citizens and were 4 deaths of Swiss citizens. Ignoring immigration and emigration, the population of Swiss citizens decreased by 3 while the foreign population remained the same. There was 1 Swiss man and 1 Swiss woman who emigrated from Switzerland. At the same time, there was 1 non-Swiss man who immigrated from another country to Switzerland. The total Swiss population change in 2008 (from all sources, including moves across municipal borders) was a decrease of 3 and the non-Swiss population increased by 1 people. This represents a population growth rate of -1.5%.

The age distribution, as of 2010, in Kilchberg is; 15 children or 11.8% of the population are between 0 and 6 years old and 10 teenagers or 7.9% are between 7 and 19. Of the adult population, 11 people or 8.7% of the population are between 20 and 29 years old. 21 people or 16.5% are between 30 and 39, 17 people or 13.4% are between 40 and 49, and 31 people or 24.4% are between 50 and 64. The senior population distribution is 17 people or 13.4% of the population are between 65 and 79 years old and there are 5 people or 3.9% who are over 80.

As of 2000, there were 35 people who were single and never married in the municipality. There were 67 married individuals, 4 widows or widowers and 3 individuals who are divorced.

As of 2000, there were 42 private households in the municipality, and an average of 2.5 persons per household. There were 5 households that consist of only one person and 3 households with five or more people. Out of a total of 43 households that answered this question, 11.6% were households made up of just one person and 1 was an adult who lived with their parents. Of the rest of the households, there are 22 married couples without children, and 13 married couples with children. There was one single parent with a child or children.

In 2000 there were 19 single family homes (or 52.8% of the total) out of a total of 36 inhabited buildings. There were 2 multi-family buildings (5.6%), along with 15 multi-purpose buildings that were mostly used for housing (41.7%). Of the single family homes 7 were built before 1919, while 5 were built between 1990 and 2000.

In 2000 there were 46 apartments in the municipality. The most common apartment size was 4 rooms of which there were 13. There were 1 single room apartments and 21 apartments with five or more rooms. Of these apartments, a total of 42 apartments (91.3% of the total) were permanently occupied, while 3 apartments (6.5%) were seasonally occupied and 1 apartments (2.2%) were empty. As of 2007, the construction rate of new housing units was 30.1 new units per 1000 residents. The vacancy rate for the municipality, in 2008, was 0%.

The historical population is given in the following chart:

== Heritage sites of national significance ==
The Reformed parish church of St. Martin in Kilchberg was listed as Swiss heritage site of national significance. The entire village of Kilchberg was listed as part of the Inventory of Swiss Heritage Sites.

The Church of St. Martin was paid for by Rudolf Zwilchenbart in 1866 in memory of his father who had died and was buried in Kilchberg. It was built in a neo-Gothic style by Paul Reber.

== Politics ==
In the 2007 federal election the most popular party was the SVP which received 29.58% of the vote. The next three most popular parties were the Green Party (26.12%), the FDP (16.44%) and the SP (12.63%). In the federal election, a total of 83 votes were cast, and the voter turnout was 75.5%.

== Economy ==
As of 2007, Kilchberg had an unemployment rate of 0.57%. As of 2005, there were 16 people employed in the primary economic sector and about 7 businesses involved in this sector. 2 people were employed in the secondary sector and there was 1 business in this sector. 3 people were employed in the tertiary sector, with 2 businesses in this sector.

There were 57 residents of the municipality who were employed in some capacity, of which females made up 36.8% of the workforce. In 2008 the total number of full-time equivalent jobs was 12. The number of jobs in the primary sector was 8, all of which were in agriculture. The number of jobs in the secondary sector was 2, all of which were in manufacturing. The number of jobs in the tertiary sector was 2. In the tertiary sector, 2 or 100.0% were technical professionals or scientists.

In 2000, there were 8 workers who commuted into the municipality and 41 workers who commuted away. The municipality is a net exporter of workers, with about 5.1 workers leaving the municipality for every one entering. Of the working population, 14% used public transportation to get to work, and 50.9% used a private car.

== Religion ==
From the 2000 census, 4 or 3.7% were Roman Catholic, while 91 or 83.5% belonged to the Swiss Reformed Church. There was 1 person who was Buddhist. 9 (or about 8.26% of the population) belonged to no church, are agnostic or atheist, and 4 individuals (or about 3.67% of the population) did not answer the question.

== Education ==
In Kilchberg about 46 or (42.2%) of the population have completed non-mandatory upper secondary education, and 17 or (15.6%) have completed additional higher education (either university or a Fachhochschule). Of the 17 who completed tertiary schooling, 70.6% were Swiss men, 29.4% were Swiss women.

As of 2000, there were 14 students from Kilchberg who attended schools outside the municipality.
