= Zeglingen =

- Municipality
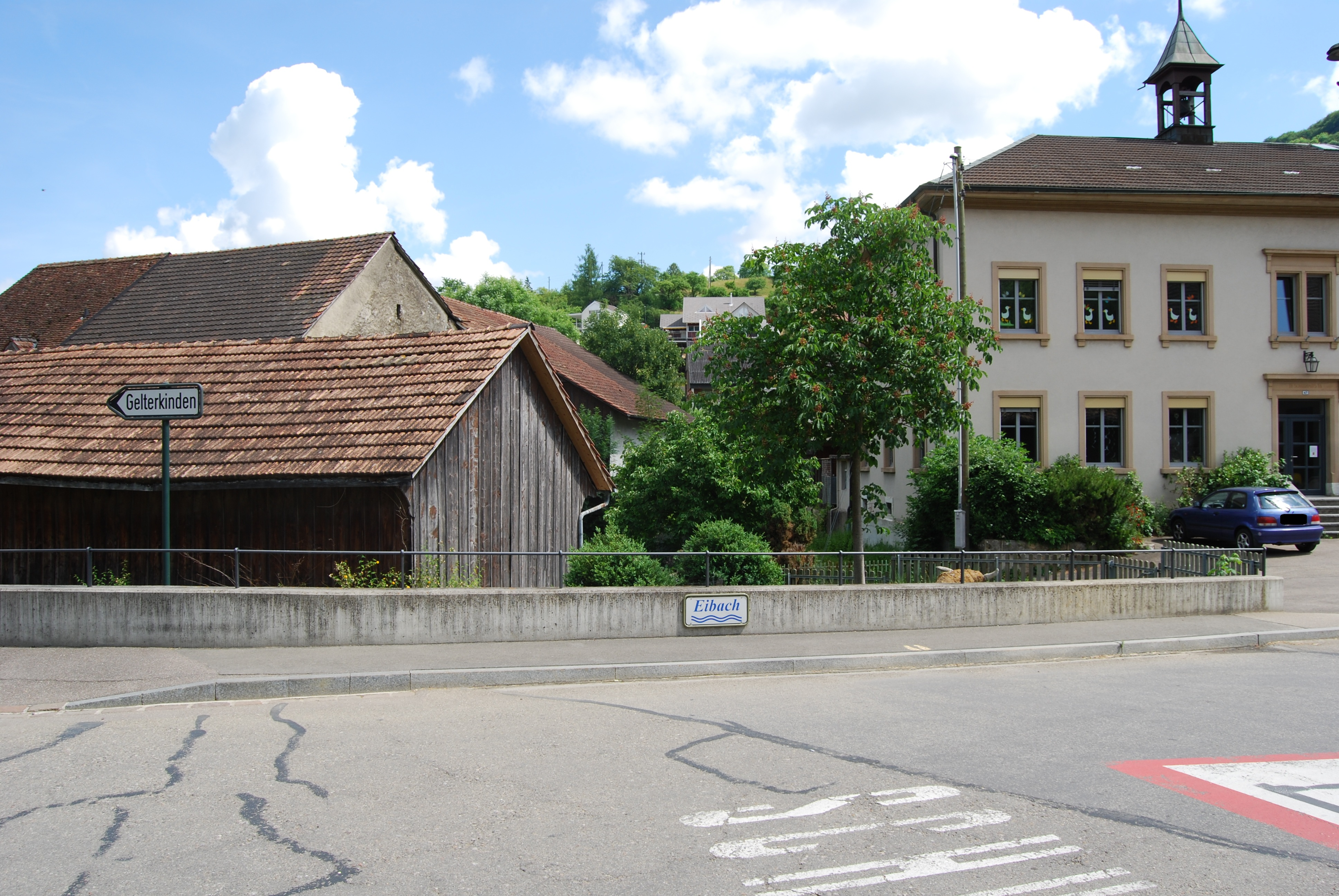

- Coat of arms
- Location of Zeglingen
- Location within Switzerland Location within Canton of Basel-Landschaft
- Coordinates: 47°25′N 7°54′E
- Country: Switzerland
- Canton: Basel-Landschaft
- District: Sissach

Area
  - Total: 7.91 km^{2} (3.05 sq mi)
- Elevation: 535 m (1,755 ft)

Population (June 2021)
  - Total: 516
  - Density: 65.2/km^{2} (169/sq mi)
- Time zone: UTC+01:00 (CET)
  - Summer (DST): UTC+02:00 (CEST)
- Postal code: 4495
- SFOS number: 2868
- ISO 3166 code: CH-BL
- Surrounded by: Häfelfingen, Kilchberg, Lostorf (SO), Oltingen, Rohr (SO), Rünenberg, Wenslingen, Wisen (SO)
- Website: http://www.zeglingen.ch SFSO statistics

Zeglingen is a municipality in the district of Sissach in the canton of Basel-Country in Switzerland.

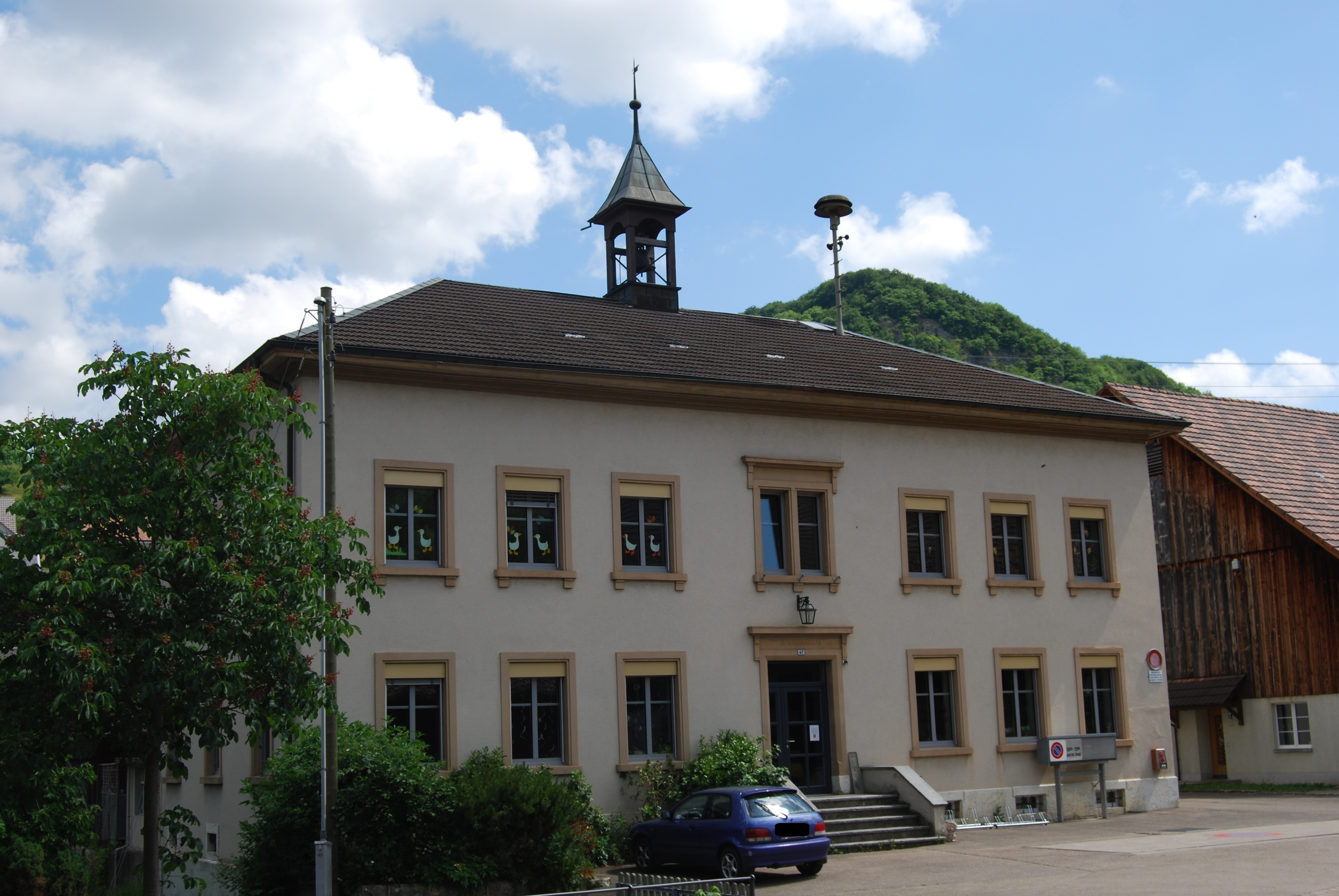
Zeglingen, school

== Geography ==
Aerial view (1953)

Zeglingen has an area, as of 2009, of 7.91 square kilometers (3.05 sq mi). Of this area, 3.84 km^{2} (1.48 sq mi) or 48.5% is used for agricultural purposes, while 3.6 km^{2} (1.4 sq mi) or 45.5% is forested. Of the rest of the land, 0.49 km^{2} (0.19 sq mi) or 6.2% is settled (buildings or roads).

Of the built up area, housing and buildings made up 2.3% and transportation infrastructure made up 1.9%. Power and water infrastructure as well as other special developed areas made up 1.6% of the area Out of the forested land, 43.7% of the total land area is heavily forested and 1.8% is covered with orchards or small clusters of trees. Of the agricultural land, 17.1% is used for growing crops and 27.8% is pastures, while 3.7% is used for orchards or vine crops.

== Coat of arms ==
The blazon of the municipal coat of arms is Gules, a Pall Argent.

== Demographics ==
Zeglingen has a population (as of June 2021) of 516. As of 2008, 3.0% of the population are resident foreign nationals. Over the last 10 years (1997–2007) the population has changed at a rate of 4%.

Most of the population (as of 2000) speaks German (424 or 95.1%), with Albanian being second most common (9 or 2.0%) and Italian language being third (5 or 1.1%). There is 1 person who speaks French.

As of 2008, the gender distribution of the population was 50.4% male and 49.6% female. The population was made up of 447 Swiss citizens (95.5% of the population), and 21 non-Swiss residents (4.5%) Of the population in the municipality 222 or about 49.8% were born in Zeglingen and lived there in 2000. There were 120 or 26.9% who were born in the same canton, while 74 or 16.6% were born somewhere else in Switzerland, and 29 or 6.5% were born outside of Switzerland.

In 2008 there were 7 live births to Swiss citizens and were 7 deaths of Swiss citizens. Ignoring immigration and emigration, the population of Swiss citizens remained the same while the foreign population remained the same. There was 1 Swiss woman who immigrated back to Switzerland. At the same time, there . The total Swiss population change in 2008 (from all sources, including moves across municipal borders) was an increase of 4 and the non-Swiss population remained the same. This represents a population growth rate of 0.9%.

The age distribution, as of 2010, in Zeglingen is; 37 children or 7.9% of the population are between 0 and 6 years old and 66 teenagers or 14.1% are between 7 and 19. Of the adult population, 45 people or 9.6% of the population are between 20 and 29 years old. 71 people or 15.2% are between 30 and 39, 67 people or 14.3% are between 40 and 49, and 93 people or 19.9% are between 50 and 64. The senior population distribution is 63 people or 13.5% of the population are between 65 and 79 years old and there are 26 people or 5.6% who are over 80.

As of 2000, there were 167 people who were single and never married in the municipality. There were 227 married individuals, 29 widows or widowers and 23 individuals who are divorced.

As of 2000, there were 182 private households in the municipality, and an average of 2.4 persons per household. There were 41 households that consist of only one person and 17 households with five or more people. Out of a total of 184 households that answered this question, 22.3% were households made up of just one person and 2 were adults who lived with their parents. Of the rest of the households, there are 67 married couples without children, 58 married couples with children There were 9 single parents with a child or children. There were 5 households that were made up unrelated people and 2 households that were made some sort of institution or another collective housing.

In 2000 there were 63 single family homes (or 47.7% of the total) out of a total of 132 inhabited buildings. There were 16 multi-family buildings (12.1%), along with 51 multi-purpose buildings that were mostly used for housing (38.6%) and 2 other use buildings (commercial or industrial) that also had some housing (1.5%). Of the single family homes 22 were built before 1919, while 10 were built between 1990 and 2000.

In 2000 there were 192 apartments in the municipality. The most common apartment size was 4 rooms of which there were 61. There were 3 single room apartments and 78 apartments with five or more rooms. Of these apartments, a total of 178 apartments (92.7% of the total) were permanently occupied, while 2 apartments (1.0%) were seasonally occupied and 12 apartments (6.3%) were empty. As of 2009, the construction rate of new housing units was 6.5 new units per 1000 residents. As of 2000 the average price to rent a three-room apartment was about 795.00 CHF (US$640, £360, €510) and a four-room apartment cost an average of .00 CHF (US$0, £0, €0). The vacancy rate for the municipality, in 2010, was 0%.

The historical population is given in the following chart:

== Politics ==
In the 2007 federal election the most popular party was the SVP which received 38.96% of the vote. The next three most popular parties were the SP (24.43%), the Green Party (16.64%) and the FDP (11.8%). In the federal election, a total of 195 votes were cast, and the voter turnout was 54.2%.

== Economy ==
As of 2010, Zeglingen had an unemployment rate of 1.1%. As of 2008, there were 56 people employed in the primary economic sector and about 21 businesses involved in this sector. 22 people were employed in the secondary sector and there were 6 businesses in this sector. 31 people were employed in the tertiary sector, with 8 businesses in this sector. There were 238 residents of the municipality who were employed in some capacity, of which females made up 42.4% of the workforce.

In 2008 the total number of full-time equivalent jobs was 76. The number of jobs in the primary sector was 33, all of which were in agriculture. The number of jobs in the secondary sector was 19, of which 15 or (78.9%) were in manufacturing and 4 (21.1%) were in construction. The number of jobs in the tertiary sector was 24. In the tertiary sector; 9 or 37.5% were in wholesale or retail sales or the repair of motor vehicles, 4 or 16.7% were technical professionals or scientists, 7 or 29.2% were in education.

In 2000, there were 21 workers who commuted into the municipality and 154 workers who commuted away. The municipality is a net exporter of workers, with about 7.3 workers leaving the municipality for every one entering. Of the working population, 17.6% used public transportation to get to work, and 53.4% used a private car.

== Religion ==
From the 2000 census, 33 or 7.4% were Roman Catholic, while 359 or 80.5% belonged to the Swiss Reformed Church. Of the rest of the population, and there were 2 individuals (or about 0.45% of the population) who belonged to another Christian church. There were 9 (or about 2.02% of the population) who were Islamic. There was 1 person who was Buddhist and 4 individuals who were Hindu. 37 (or about 8.30% of the population) belonged to no church, are agnostic or atheist, and 1 individuals (or about 0.22% of the population) did not answer the question.

== Education ==
In Zeglingen about 193 or (43.3%) of the population have completed non-mandatory upper secondary education, and 35 or (7.8%) have completed additional higher education (either university or a Fachhochschule). Of the 35 who completed tertiary schooling, 77.1% were Swiss men, 17.1% were Swiss women.

As of 2000, there were 5 students in Zeglingen who came from another municipality, while 30 residents attended schools outside the municipality.
