= Anwil =

- Municipality
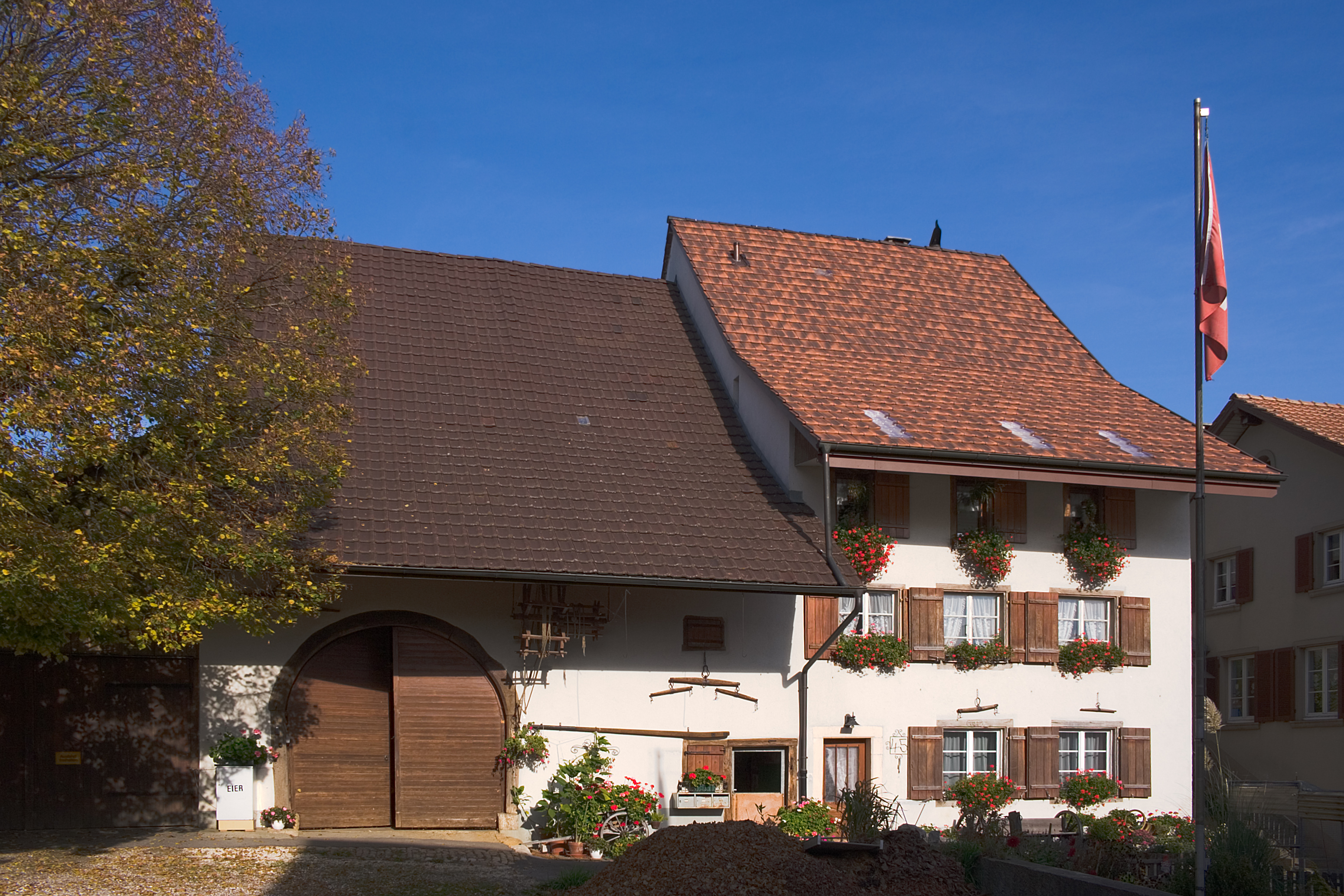

- Flag Coat of arms
- Location of Anwil
- Location within Switzerland Location within Canton of Basel-Landschaft
- Coordinates: 47°27′N 7°56′E
- Country: Switzerland
- Canton: Basel-Landschaft
- District: Sissach

Area
  - Total: 3.96 km^{2} (1.53 sq mi)
- Elevation: 315 m (1,033 ft)

Population (June 2021)
  - Total: 532
  - Density: 134/km^{2} (348/sq mi)
- Time zone: UTC+01:00 (CET)
  - Summer (DST): UTC+02:00 (CEST)
- Postal code: 4469
- SFOS number: 2841
- ISO 3166 code: CH-BL
- Surrounded by: Kienberg (SO), Oltingen, Rothenfluh, Wenslingen, Wittnau (AG)
- Website: https://www.anwil.ch SFSO statistics

Anwil is a municipality in the district of Sissach in the canton of Basel-Country in Switzerland.

== History ==
Anwil is first mentioned in 1276.

== Geography ==
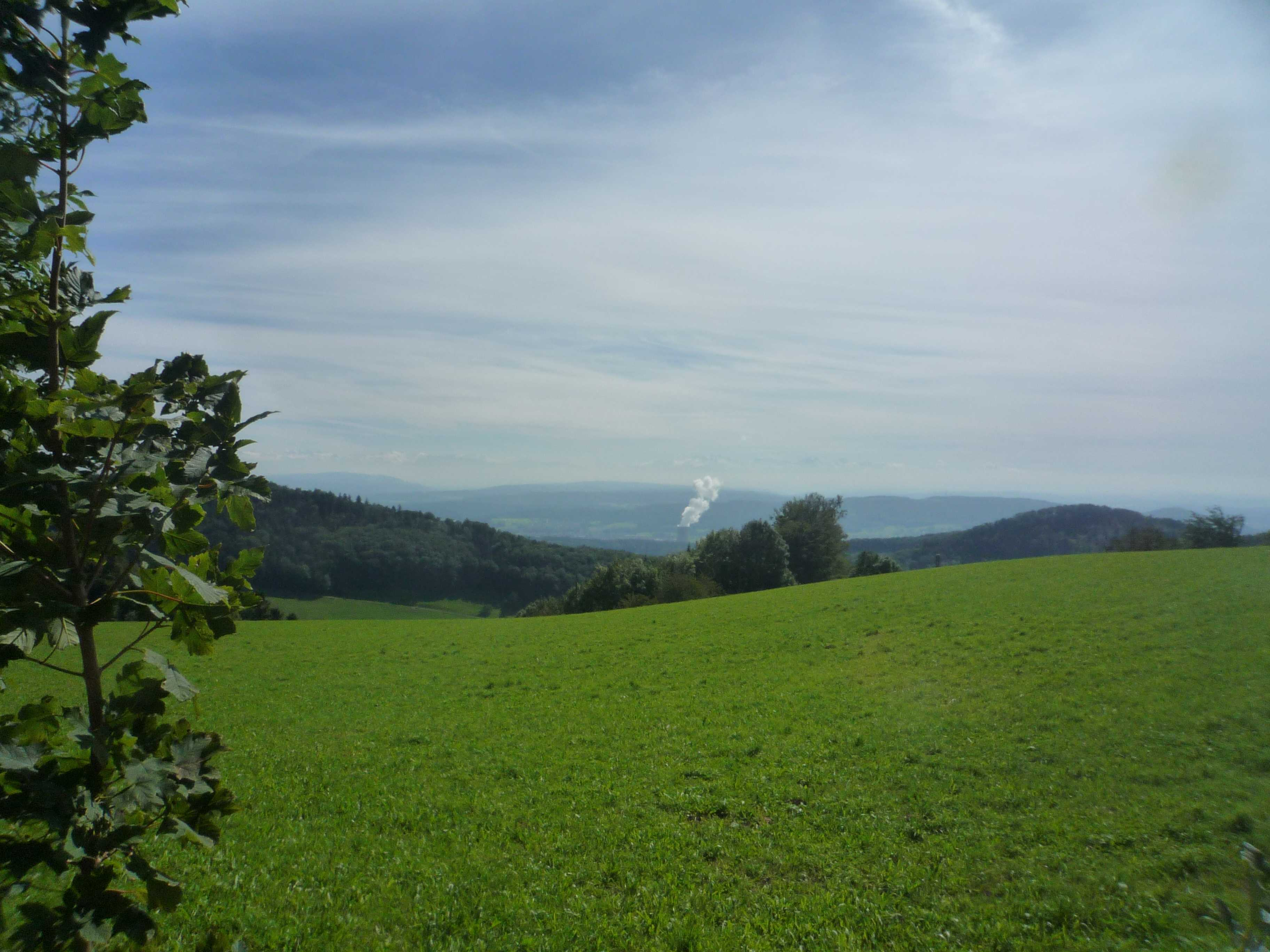
Countryside near Anwil

Aerial view from 3000 m by Walter Mittelholzer (1922)

Anwil has an area, as of 2009, of 3.96 square kilometers (1.53 sq mi). Of this area, 2.52 km^{2} (0.97 sq mi) or 63.6% is used for agricultural purposes, while 1.1 km^{2} (0.42 sq mi) or 27.8% is forested. Of the rest of the land, 0.32 km^{2} (0.12 sq mi) or 8.1% is settled (buildings or roads), 0.03 km^{2} (7.4 acres) or 0.8% is either rivers or lakes and 0.02 km^{2} (4.9 acres) or 0.5% is unproductive land.

Of the built up area, housing and buildings made up 5.3% and transportation infrastructure made up 2.5%. Out of the forested land, 26.5% of the total land area is heavily forested and 1.3% is covered with orchards or small clusters of trees. Of the agricultural land, 42.4% is used for growing crops and 17.7% is pastures, while 3.5% is used for orchards or vine crops. All the water in the municipality is in lakes.

The municipality is located in the Sissach district and is the easternmost municipality in the half canton. It consists of the haufendorf village (an irregular, unplanned and quite closely packed village, built around a central square) of Anwil, located in the Jura Mountains between the Ergolz valleys and the Kienberger Eital.

== Coat of arms ==
The blazon of the municipal coat of arms is Per pale Sable and Argent, in Chief Or.

== Demographics ==
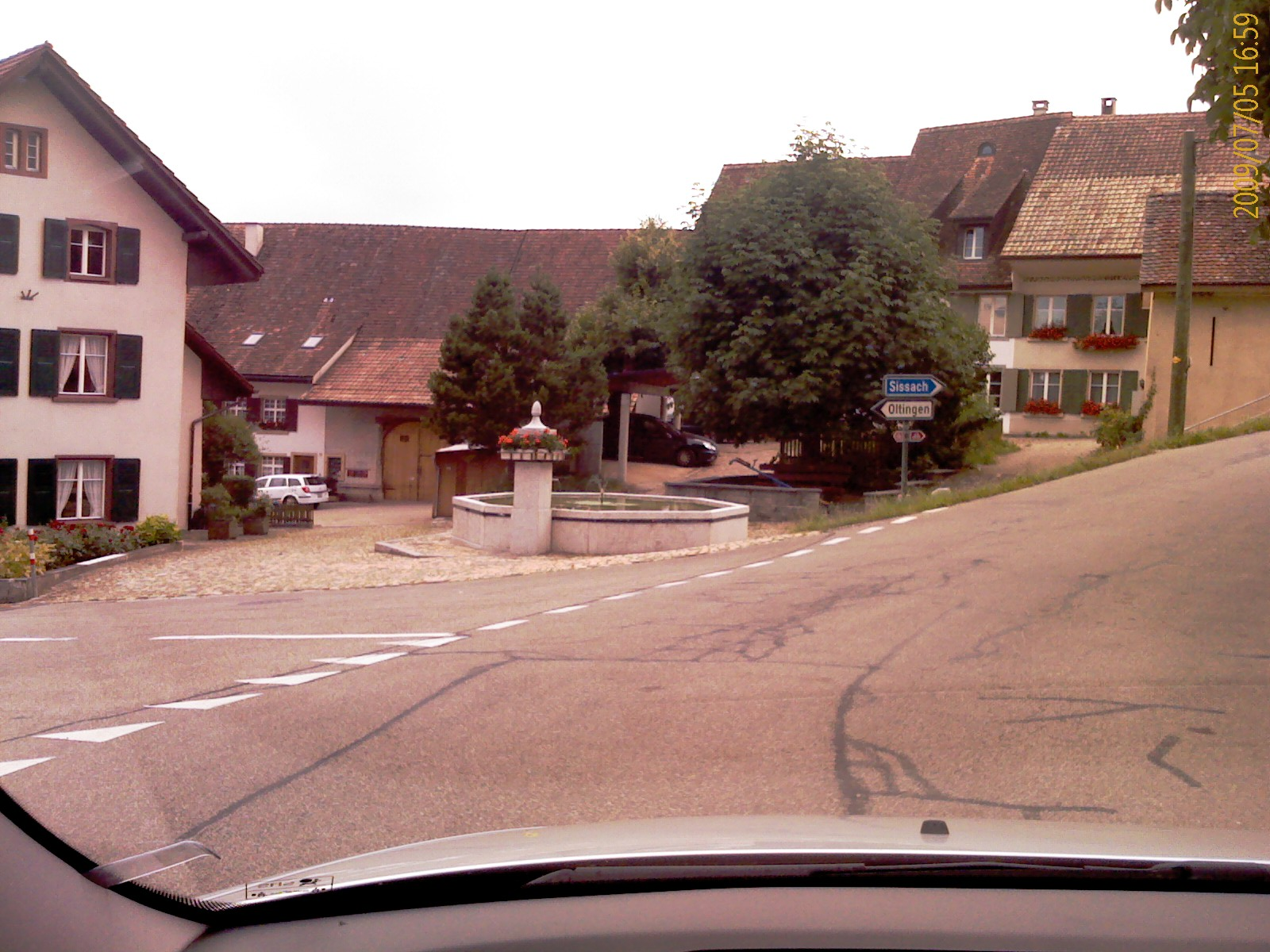
Anwil village

Anwil has a population (as of June 2021) of 532. As of 2008, 8.2% of the population are resident foreign nationals. Over the last 10 years (1997–2007) the population has changed at a rate of 29.1%.

Most of the population (as of 2000) speaks German (477 or 96.4%), with Portuguese being second most common (5 or 1.0%) and Italian language being third (4 or 0.8%). There are 2 people who speak French and people who speak Romansh.

As of 2008, the gender distribution of the population was 49.7% male and 50.3% female. The population was made up of 524 Swiss citizens (93.1% of the population), and 39 non-Swiss residents (6.9%) Of the population in the municipality 217 or about 43.8% were born in Anwil and lived there in 2000. There were 142 or 28.7% who were born in the same canton, while 85 or 17.2% were born somewhere else in Switzerland, and 34 or 6.9% were born outside of Switzerland.

In 2008 there were 3 live births to Swiss citizens and were 6 deaths of Swiss citizens. Ignoring immigration and emigration, the population of Swiss citizens decreased by 3 while the foreign population remained the same. There was 1 Swiss woman who immigrated back to Switzerland. At the same time, there were 3 non-Swiss men and 1 non-Swiss woman who immigrated from another country to Switzerland. The total Swiss population change in 2008 (from all sources, including moves across municipal borders) was a decrease of 4 and the non-Swiss population increased by 13 people. This represents a population growth rate of 1.6%.

The age distribution, as of 2010, in Anwil is; 45 children or 8.0% of the population are between 0 and 6 years old and 104 teenagers or 18.5% are between 7 and 19. Of the adult population, 56 people or 9.9% of the population are between 20 and 29 years old. 65 people or 11.5% are between 30 and 39, 118 people or 21.0% are between 40 and 49, and 102 people or 18.1% are between 50 and 64. The senior population distribution is 55 people or 9.8% of the population are between 65 and 79 years old and there are 18 people or 3.2% who are over 80.

As of 2000, there were 208 people who were single and never married in the municipality. There were 247 married individuals, 23 widows or widowers and 17 individuals who are divorced.

As of 2000, there were 171 private households in the municipality, and an average of 2.9 persons per household. There were 31 households that consist of only one person and 25 households with five or more people. Out of a total of 174 households that answered this question, 17.8% were households made up of just one person and 1 were adults who lived with their parents. Of the rest of the households, there are 56 married couples without children, 72 married couples with children There were 8 single parents with a child or children. There were 3 households that were made up unrelated people and 3 households that were made some sort of institution or another collective housing.

In 2000 there were 74 single family homes (or 59.7% of the total) out of a total of 124 inhabited buildings. There were 20 multi-family buildings (16.1%), along with 24 multi-purpose buildings that were mostly used for housing (19.4%) and 6 other use buildings (commercial or industrial) that also had some housing (4.8%). Of the single family homes 6 were built before 1919, while 26 were built between 1990 and 2000. The greatest number of single family homes (19) were built between 1981 and 1990.

In 2000 there were 182 apartments in the municipality. The most common apartment size was 4 rooms of which there were 44. There were 2 single room apartments and 82 apartments with five or more rooms. Of these apartments, a total of 168 apartments (92.3% of the total) were permanently occupied, while 8 apartments (4.4%) were seasonally occupied and 6 apartments (3.3%) were empty. As of 2007, the construction rate of new housing units was 16 new units per 1000 residents. As of 2000 the average price to rent a four-room apartment was 1410.00 CHF (US$1130, £630, €900). The vacancy rate for the municipality, in 2008, was 0%.

The historical population is given in the following chart:

== Sights ==
The entire village of Anwil is designated as part of the Inventory of Swiss Heritage Sites.

== Politics ==
In the 2007 federal election the most popular party was the SVP which received 40.19% of the vote. The next three most popular parties were the SP (15.31%), the Green Party (14.91%) and the FDP (13.27%). In the federal election, a total of 187 votes were cast, and the voter turnout was 46.5%.

== Economy ==
As of 2007, Anwil had an unemployment rate of 1.17%. As of 2005, there were 41 people employed in the primary economic sector and about 15 businesses involved in this sector. 4 people were employed in the secondary sector and there were 3 businesses in this sector. 36 people were employed in the tertiary sector, with 11 businesses in this sector. There were 223 residents of the municipality who were employed in some capacity, of which females made up 37.2% of the workforce.

In 2008 the total number of full-time equivalent jobs was 55. The number of jobs in the primary sector was 26, all of which were in agriculture. The number of jobs in the secondary sector was 6, of which 3 or (50.0%) were in manufacturing and 4 (66.7%) were in construction. The number of jobs in the tertiary sector was 23. In the tertiary sector; 1 or 4.3% were in wholesale or retail sales or the repair of motor vehicles, 2 or 8.7% were in the movement and storage of goods, 8 or 34.8% were in a hotel or restaurant, 2 or 8.7% were technical professionals or scientists, 8 or 34.8% were in education.

In 2000, there were 21 workers who commuted into the municipality and 174 workers who commuted away. The municipality is a net exporter of workers, with about 8.3 workers leaving the municipality for every one entering. Of the working population, 17% used public transportation to get to work, and 54.7% used a private car.

== Religion ==
From the 2000 census, 51 or 10.3% were Roman Catholic, while 346 or 69.9% belonged to the Swiss Reformed Church. Of the rest of the population, there was 1 member of an Orthodox church who belonged, there were 5 individuals (or about 1.01% of the population) who belonged to the Christian Catholic Church, and there were 23 individuals (or about 4.65% of the population) who belonged to another Christian church. There were 5 (or about 1.01% of the population) who were Islamic. 50 (or about 10.10% of the population) belonged to no church, are agnostic or atheist, and 13 individuals (or about 2.63% of the population) did not answer the question.

== Education ==
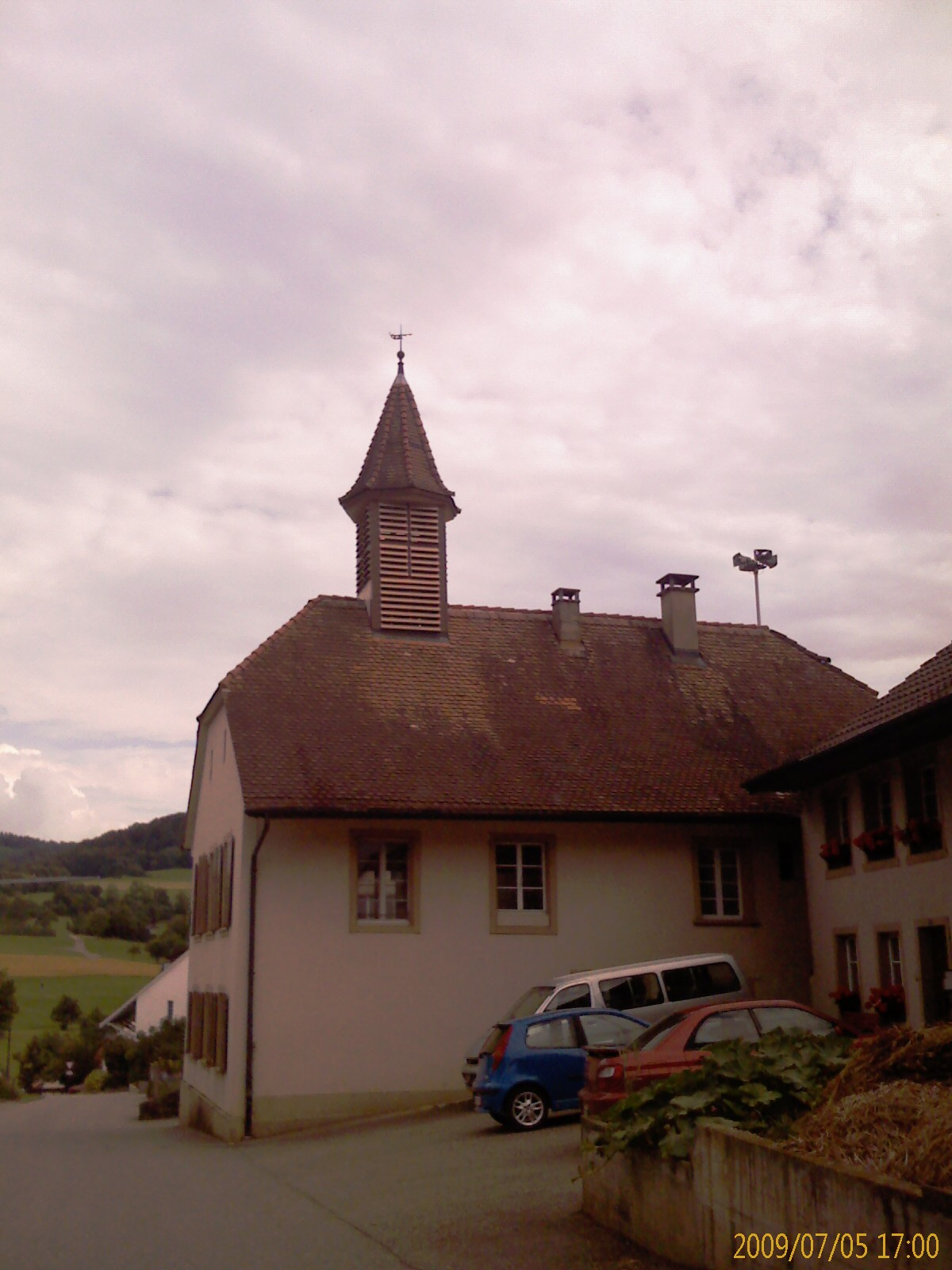
Schoolhouse in Anwil

In Anwil about 178 or (36.0%) of the population have completed non-mandatory upper secondary education, and 47 or (9.5%) have completed additional higher education (either university or a Fachhochschule). Of the 47 who completed tertiary schooling, 72.3% were Swiss men, 12.8% were Swiss women, 10.6% were non-Swiss men.

As of 2000, there were 38 students from Anwil who attended schools outside the municipality.
