= Tenniken =

- Municipality
- Coat of arms
- Location of Tenniken
- Location within Switzerland Location within Canton of Basel-Landschaft
- Coordinates: 47°26′N 7°49′E
- Country: Switzerland
- Canton: Basel-Landschaft
- District: Sissach

Area
  - Total: 4.66 km^{2} (1.80 sq mi)
- Elevation: 430 m (1,410 ft)

Population (June 2021)
  - Total: 929
  - Density: 199/km^{2} (516/sq mi)
- Time zone: UTC+01:00 (CET)
  - Summer (DST): UTC+02:00 (CEST)
- Postal code: 4456
- SFOS number: 2863
- ISO 3166 code: CH-BL
- Surrounded by: Diegten, Diepflingen, Hölstein, Thürnen, Wittinsburg, Zunzgen
- Website: www.tenniken.ch

Tenniken is a municipality in the district of Sissach in the canton of Basel-Country in Switzerland.

== Geography ==
Aerial view (1968)

Tenniken has an area, as of 2009, of 4.66 square kilometers (1.80 sq mi). Of this area, 2.23 km^{2} (0.86 sq mi) or 47.9% is used for agricultural purposes, while 1.92 km^{2} (0.74 sq mi) or 41.2% is forested. Of the rest of the land, 0.53 km^{2} (0.20 sq mi) or 11.4% is settled (buildings or roads).

Of the built up area, housing and buildings made up 5.8% and transportation infrastructure made up 4.5%. Out of the forested land, 40.1% of the total land area is heavily forested and 1.1% is covered with orchards or small clusters of trees. Of the agricultural land, 23.0% is used for growing crops and 20.8% is pastures, while 4.1% is used for orchards or vine crops.

== Coat of arms ==
The blazon of the municipal coat of arms is Per pale, Or a letter Tau Sable, and bendy of six Sable and Argent.

== Demographics ==
Tenniken has a population (as of June 2021) of 929. As of 2008, 6.6% of the population are resident foreign nationals. Over the last 10 years (1997–2007) the population has changed at a rate of -7.3%.

Most of the population (as of 2000) speaks German (875 or 97.2%), with Spanish being second most common (8 or 0.9%) and French being third (4 or 0.4%).

As of 2008, the gender distribution of the population was 47.9% male and 52.1% female. The population was made up of 824 Swiss citizens (93.0% of the population), and 62 non-Swiss residents (7.0%) Of the population in the municipality 271 or about 30.1% were born in Tenniken and lived there in 2000. There were 328 or 36.4% who were born in the same canton, while 229 or 25.4% were born somewhere else in Switzerland, and 69 or 7.7% were born outside of Switzerland.

In 2008 there were 7 live births to Swiss citizens and 1 birth to non-Swiss citizens, and in same time span there were 3 deaths of Swiss citizens. Ignoring immigration and emigration, the population of Swiss citizens increased by 4 while the foreign population increased by 1. There was 1 Swiss man who emigrated from Switzerland. At the same time, there was 1 non-Swiss man and 1 non-Swiss woman who immigrated from another country to Switzerland. The total Swiss population change in 2008 (from all sources, including moves across municipal borders) was a decrease of 21 and the non-Swiss population increased by 5 people. This represents a population growth rate of -1.8%.

The age distribution, as of 2010, in Tenniken is; 56 children or 6.3% of the population are between 0 and 6 years old and 117 teenagers or 13.2% are between 7 and 19. Of the adult population, 109 people or 12.3% of the population are between 20 and 29 years old. 114 people or 12.9% are between 30 and 39, 134 people or 15.1% are between 40 and 49, and 236 people or 26.6% are between 50 and 64. The senior population distribution is 94 people or 10.6% of the population are between 65 and 79 years old and there are 26 people or 2.9% who are over 80.

As of 2000, there were 384 people who were single and never married in the municipality. There were 436 married individuals, 37 widows or widowers and 43 individuals who are divorced.

As of 2000, there were 337 private households in the municipality, and an average of 2.6 persons per household. There were 83 households that consist of only one person and 38 households with five or more people. Out of a total of 340 households that answered this question, 24.4% were households made up of just one person and 1 were adults who lived with their parents. Of the rest of the households, there are 94 married couples without children, 137 married couples with children There were 20 single parents with a child or children. There were 2 households that were made up unrelated people and 3 households that were made some sort of institution or another collective housing.

In 2000 there were 178 single family homes (or 67.9% of the total) out of a total of 262 inhabited buildings. There were 43 multi-family buildings (16.4%), along with 32 multi-purpose buildings that were mostly used for housing (12.2%) and 9 other use buildings (commercial or industrial) that also had some housing (3.4%). Of the single family homes 15 were built before 1919, while 37 were built between 1990 and 2000. The greatest number of single family homes (47) were built between 1971 and 1980.

In 2000 there were 355 apartments in the municipality. The most common apartment size was 5 rooms of which there were 112. There were 2 single room apartments and 178 apartments with five or more rooms. Of these apartments, a total of 335 apartments (94.4% of the total) were permanently occupied, while 6 apartments (1.7%) were seasonally occupied and 14 apartments (3.9%) were empty. As of 2009, the construction rate of new housing units was 3.4 new units per 1000 residents. As of 2000 the average price to rent a two-room apartment was about 674.00 CHF (US$540, £300, €430), a three-room apartment was about 918.00 CHF (US$730, £410, €590) and a four-room apartment cost an average of 1127.00 CHF (US$900, £510, €720). The vacancy rate for the municipality, in 2010, was 0%.

The historical population is given in the following chart:

== Politics ==
In the 2007 federal election the most popular party was the SVP which received 27.67% of the vote. The next three most popular parties were the SP (23.62%), the Green Party (21.39%) and the FDP (15.9%). In the federal election, a total of 331 votes were cast, and the voter turnout was 48.0%.

== Economy ==
As of 2010, Tenniken had an unemployment rate of 1.4%. As of 2008, there were 31 people employed in the primary economic sector and about 11 businesses involved in this sector. 219 people were employed in the secondary sector and there were 8 businesses in this sector. 100 people were employed in the tertiary sector, with 27 businesses in this sector. There were 523 residents of the municipality who were employed in some capacity, of which females made up 41.5% of the workforce.

In 2008 the total number of full-time equivalent jobs was 303. The number of jobs in the primary sector was 20, all of which were in agriculture. The number of jobs in the secondary sector was 202, of which 194 or (96.0%) were in manufacturing and 2 (1.0%) were in construction. The number of jobs in the tertiary sector was 81. In the tertiary sector; 25 or 30.9% were in wholesale or retail sales or the repair of motor vehicles, 1 or 1.2% were in the movement and storage of goods, 2 or 2.5% were in a hotel or restaurant, 37 or 45.7% were technical professionals or scientists, 6 or 7.4% were in education. Grovana Watch, a global supplier of wristwatches, is one of the largest employers in the town, with 35 full-time employees.

In 2000, there were 217 workers who commuted into the municipality and 415 workers who commuted away. The municipality is a net exporter of workers, with about 1.9 workers leaving the municipality for every one entering. About 9.2% of the workforce coming into Tenniken are coming from outside Switzerland. Of the working population, 23.3% used public transportation to get to work, and 56.4% used a private car.

== Religion ==
From the 2000 census, 121 or 13.4% were Roman Catholic, while 583 or 64.8% belonged to the Swiss Reformed Church. Of the rest of the population, there were 2 members of an Orthodox church (or about 0.22% of the population), there were 2 individuals (or about 0.22% of the population) who belonged to the Christian Catholic Church, and there were 34 individuals (or about 3.78% of the population) who belonged to another Christian church. There were 7 (or about 0.78% of the population) who were Islamic. There was 1 person who was Buddhist. 148 (or about 16.44% of the population) belonged to no church, are agnostic or atheist, and 2 individuals (or about 0.22% of the population) did not answer the question.

== Education ==
In Tenniken about 402 or (44.7%) of the population have completed non-mandatory upper secondary education, and 98 or (10.9%) have completed additional higher education (either university or a Fachhochschule). Of the 98 who completed tertiary schooling, 73.5% were Swiss men, 21.4% were Swiss women.

As of 2000, there was one student in Tenniken who came from another municipality, while 96 residents attended schools outside the municipality.
