= Diepflingen railway station =

Railway station in Switzerland

Diepflingen
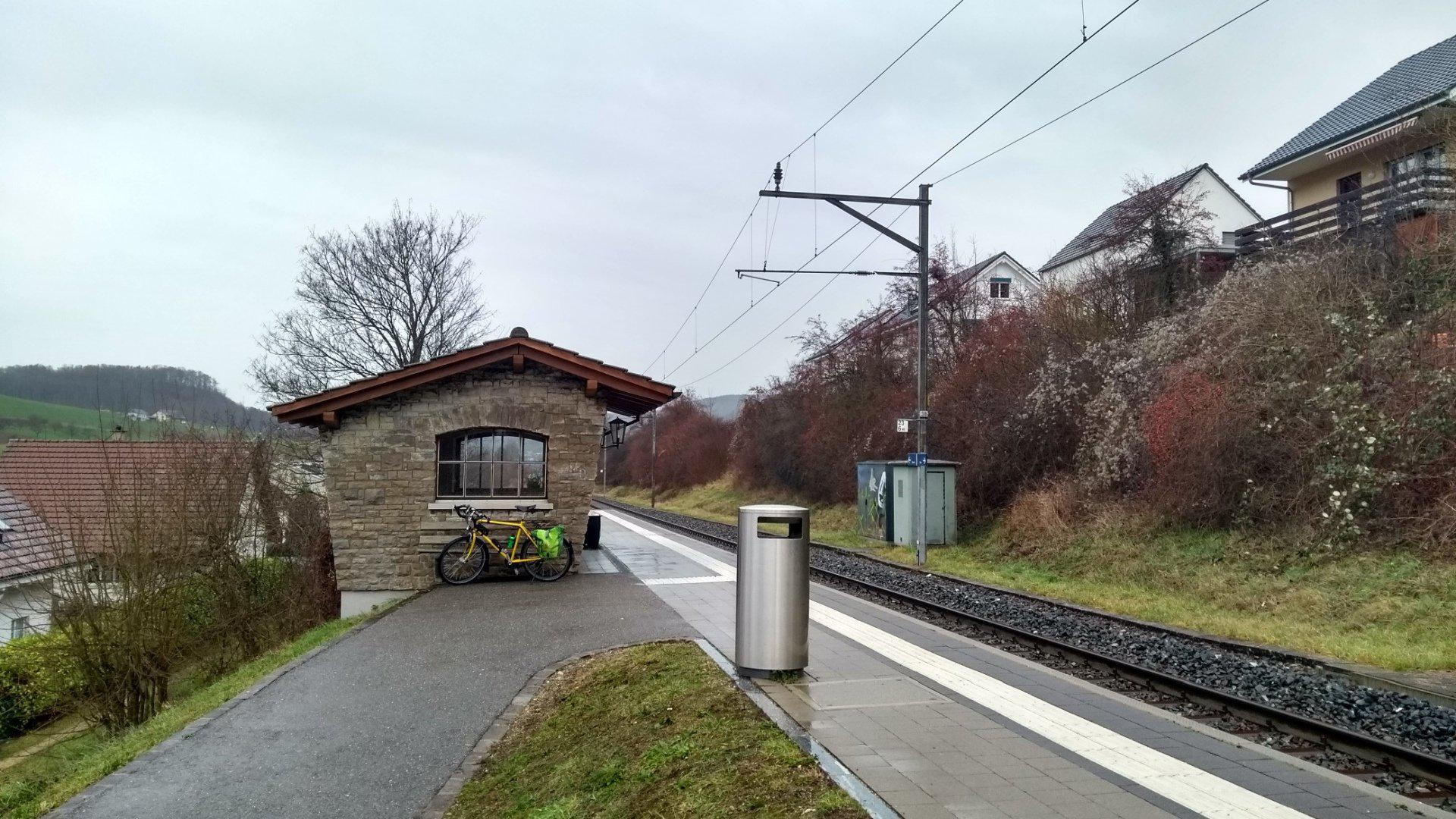
- The station in 2019

General information
- Location: Diepflingen; Switzerland
- Coordinates: 47°26′58.42″N 7°50′15.94″E
- Owner: Swiss Federal Railways
- Line: Hauenstein line
- Train operators: Swiss Federal Railways

Services
Preceding station	Basel S-Bahn	Following station
Sissach Terminus	S9	Sommerau towards Olten
Location
- Location within Switzerland

Diepflingen railway station (German: Bahnhof Diepflingen) is a railway station in the municipality of Diepflingen, in the Swiss canton of Basel-Landschaft. It is an intermediate stop on the summit branch of the Hauenstein line and is served by local trains only.

== Services ==
The following services stop at Diepflingen:

- Basel S-Bahn S9: hourly service between Sissach and Olten.
