= Diegten =

- Municipality
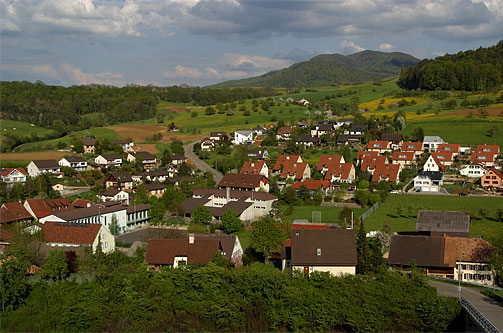

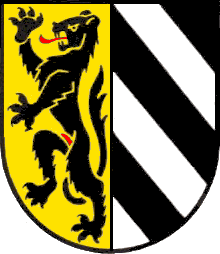
- Coat of arms
- Location of Diegten
- Location within Switzerland Location within Canton of Basel-Landschaft
- Coordinates: 47°25′N 7°49′E
- Country: Switzerland
- Canton: Basel-Landschaft
- District: Waldenburg

Area
  - Total: 9.64 km^{2} (3.72 sq mi)
- Elevation: 469 m (1,539 ft)

Population (June 2021)
  - Total: 1,638
  - Density: 170/km^{2} (440/sq mi)
- Time zone: UTC+01:00 (CET)
  - Summer (DST): UTC+02:00 (CEST)
- Postal code: 4457
- SFOS number: 2884
- ISO 3166 code: CH-BL
- Surrounded by: Bennwil, Eptingen, Hölstein, Känerkinden, Läufelfingen, Tenniken, Wittinsburg
- Website: www.diegten.ch

Diegten is a municipality in the district of Waldenburg in the canton of Basel-Country in Switzerland.

== History ==
Diegten is first mentioned in 1152 as Dietingoven. In 1213 it was mentioned as Dietikon, in 1342 it was mentioned as Dietken and in 1671 it was Dieckten.

== Geography ==
Aerial view (1953)

Diegten has an area, as of 2009, of 9.64 square kilometers (3.72 sq mi). Of this area, 4.77 km^{2} (1.84 sq mi) or 49.5% is used for agricultural purposes, while 3.81 km^{2} (1.47 sq mi) or 39.5% is forested. Of the rest of the land, 1.07 km^{2} (0.41 sq mi) or 11.1% is settled (buildings or roads).

Of the built up area, housing and buildings made up 4.6% and transportation infrastructure made up 5.5%. Out of the forested land, 37.6% of the total land area is heavily forested and 2.0% is covered with orchards or small clusters of trees. Of the agricultural land, 25.5% is used for growing crops and 19.1% is pastures, while 4.9% is used for orchards or vine crops.

The municipality is located in the Waldenburg district, in the Diegter valley. It consists of a 2 km (1.2 mi) long string of five linear villages; Ober-Diegten, Mühle-Diegten, Mittel-Diegten, Schloss-Diegten and Nieder-Diegten.

== Coat of arms ==
The blazon of the municipal coat of arms is Per pale, Or a Lion rampant Sable, and Bendy of six Sable and Argent.

== Demographics ==
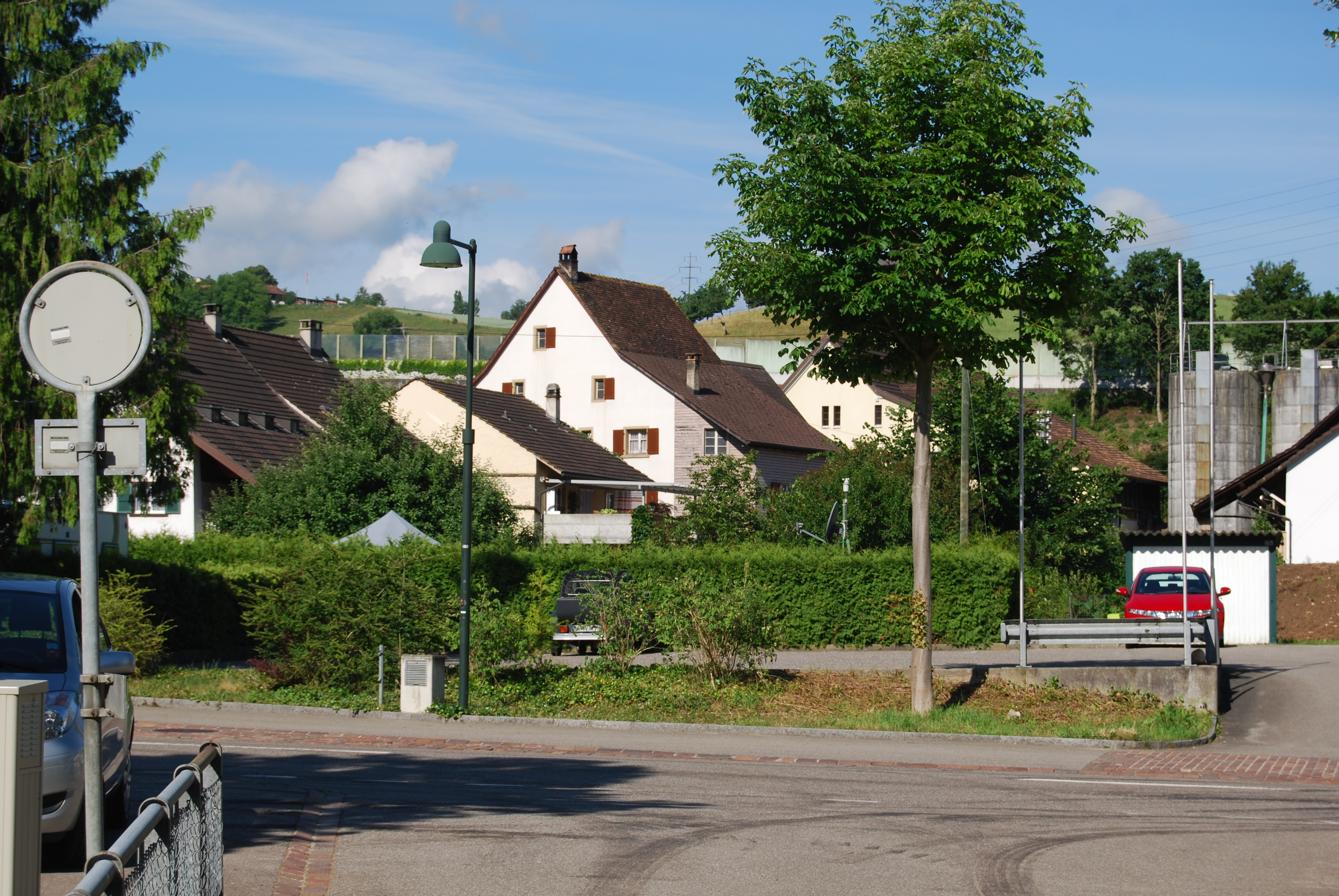

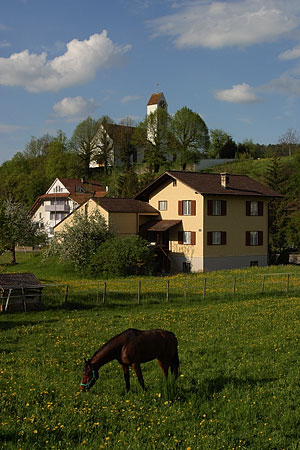
Church in Diegten

Diegten has a population (as of June 2021) of 1,638. As of 2008, 7.6% of the population are resident foreign nationals. Over the last 10 years (1997–2007) the population has changed at a rate of 13.7%.

Most of the population (as of 2000) speaks German (1,338 or 96.3%), with French being second most common (9 or 0.6%) and French being third (9 or 0.6%).

As of 2008, the gender distribution of the population was 49.6% male and 50.4% female. The population was made up of 1,425 Swiss citizens (90.4% of the population), and 152 non-Swiss residents (9.6%) Of the population in the municipality 418 or about 30.1% were born in Diegten and lived there in 2000. There were 451 or 32.4% who were born in the same canton, while 378 or 27.2% were born somewhere else in Switzerland, and 108 or 7.8% were born outside of Switzerland.

In 2008 there were 11 live births to Swiss citizens and 5 births to non-Swiss citizens, and in same time span there were 10 deaths of Swiss citizens and 1 non-Swiss citizen death. Ignoring immigration and emigration, the population of Swiss citizens increased by 1 while the foreign population increased by 4. There was 1 Swiss man who immigrated back to Switzerland. At the same time, there were 3 non-Swiss men and 8 non-Swiss women who immigrated from another country to Switzerland. The total Swiss population change in 2008 (from all sources, including moves across municipal borders) was a decrease of 2 and the non-Swiss population increased by 8 people. This represents a population growth rate of 0.4%.

The age distribution, as of 2010, in Diegten is; 108 children or 6.8% of the population are between 0 and 6 years old and 307 teenagers or 19.5% are between 7 and 19. Of the adult population, 156 people or 9.9% of the population are between 20 and 29 years old. 213 people or 13.5% are between 30 and 39, 303 people or 19.2% are between 40 and 49, and 302 people or 19.2% are between 50 and 64. The senior population distribution is 145 people or 9.2% of the population are between 65 and 79 years old and there are 43 people or 2.7% who are over 80.

As of 2000, there were 586 people who were single and never married in the municipality. There were 681 married individuals, 62 widows or widowers and 61 individuals who are divorced.

As of 2000, there were 510 private households in the municipality, and an average of 2.6 persons per household. There were 113 households that consist of only one person and 53 households with five or more people. Out of a total of 518 households that answered this question, 21.8% were households made up of just one person and 4 were adults who lived with their parents. Of the rest of the households, there are 163 married couples without children, 205 married couples with children There were 20 single parents with a child or children. There were 5 households that were made up unrelated people and 8 households that were made some sort of institution or another collective housing.

In 2000 there were 275 single-family homes (or 67.6% of the total) out of a total of 407 inhabited buildings. There were 48 multi-family buildings (11.8%), along with 70 multi-purpose buildings that were mostly used for housing (17.2%) and 14 other use buildings (commercial or industrial) that also had some housing (3.4%). Of the single-family homes 22 were built before 1919, while 87 were built between 1990 and 2000. The greatest number of single-family homes (68) were built between 1981 and 1990.

In 2000 there were 540 apartments in the municipality. The most common apartment size was 5 rooms of which there were 170. There were 12 single-room apartments and 271 apartments with five or more rooms. Of these apartments, a total of 490 apartments (90.7% of the total) were permanently occupied, while 36 apartments (6.7%) were seasonally occupied and 14 apartments (2.6%) were empty. As of 2009, the construction rate of new housing units was 9.6 new units per 1000 residents. As of 2000 the average price to rent a two-room apartment was about 738.00 CHF (US$590, £330, €470), a three-room apartment was about 1070.00 CHF (US$860, £480, €680) and a four-room apartment cost an average of 1274.00 CHF (US$1020, £570, €820). The vacancy rate for the municipality, in 2010, was 1.41%.

The historical population is given in the following chart:

== Politics ==
In the 2007 federal election the most popular party was the SVP which received 44.67% of the vote. The next three most popular parties were the SP (18.57%), the Green Party (14.13%) and the FDP (14.01%). In the federal election, a total of 520 votes were cast, and the voter turnout was 48.1%.

== Economy ==
As of 2010, Diegten had an unemployment rate of 2.7%. As of 2008, there were 108 people employed in the primary economic sector and about 32 businesses involved in this sector. 81 people were employed in the secondary sector and there were 18 businesses in this sector. 206 people were employed in the tertiary sector, with 34 businesses in this sector. There were 754 residents of the municipality who were employed in some capacity, of which females made up 41.0% of the workforce.

In 2008 the total number of full-time equivalent jobs was 286. The number of jobs in the primary sector was 74, of which 69 were in agriculture and 5 were in forestry or lumber production. The number of jobs in the secondary sector was 73 of which 48 or (65.8%) were in manufacturing and 25 (34.2%) were in construction. The number of jobs in the tertiary sector was 139. In the tertiary sector; 21 or 15.1% were in wholesale or retail sales or the repair of motor vehicles, 13 or 9.4% were in the movement and storage of goods, 14 or 10.1% were in a hotel or restaurant, 2 or 1.4% were in the information industry, 1 was the insurance or financial industry, 6 or 4.3% were technical professionals or scientists, 37 or 26.6% were in education and 32 or 23.0% were in health care.

In 2000, there were 149 workers who commuted into the municipality and 540 workers who commuted away. The municipality is a net exporter of workers, with about 3.6 workers leaving the municipality for every one entering. Of the working population, 17.1% used public transportation to get to work, and 57% used a private car.

== Religion ==
From the 2000 census, 228 or 16.4% were Roman Catholic, while 898 or 64.6% belonged to the Swiss Reformed Church. Of the rest of the population, there were 6 members of an Orthodox church (or about 0.43% of the population), there were 4 individuals (or about 0.29% of the population) who belonged to the Christian Catholic Church, and there were 67 individuals (or about 4.82% of the population) who belonged to another Christian church. There were 5 individuals (or about 0.36% of the population) who were Jewish, and 20 (or about 1.44% of the population) who were Islamic. There was 1 person who was Buddhist, 2 individuals who were Hindu and 2 individuals who belonged to another church. 131 (or about 9.42% of the population) belonged to no church, are agnostic or atheist, and 26 individuals (or about 1.87% of the population) did not answer the question.

== Education ==
In Diegten about 594 or (42.7%) of the population have completed non-mandatory upper secondary education, and 128 or (9.2%) have completed additional higher education (either university or a Fachhochschule). Of the 128 who completed tertiary schooling, 71.9% were Swiss men, 21.9% were Swiss women and 4.7% were non-Swiss men.

As of 2000, there were 91 students in Diegten who came from another municipality, while 101 residents attended schools outside the municipality.
