= Wittinsburg =

- Municipality
- Coat of arms
- Location of Wittinsburg
- Location within Switzerland Location within Canton of Basel-Landschaft
- Coordinates: 47°26′N 7°51′E
- Country: Switzerland
- Canton: Basel-Landschaft
- District: Sissach

Area
  - Total: 3.21 km^{2} (1.24 sq mi)
- Elevation: 573 m (1,880 ft)

Population (June 2021)
  - Total: 434
  - Density: 135/km^{2} (350/sq mi)
- Time zone: UTC+01:00 (CET)
  - Summer (DST): UTC+02:00 (CEST)
- Postal code: 4443
- SFOS number: 2867
- ISO 3166 code: CH-BL
- Surrounded by: Buckten, Diegten, Diepflingen, Gelterkinden, Känerkinden, Rümlingen, Tenniken, Thürnen
- Website: www.wittinsburg.ch

Wittinsburg is a municipality in the district of Sissach in the canton of Basel-Country in Switzerland.

== Geography ==
Wittinsburg has an area, as of 2009, of 3.21 square kilometers (1.24 sq mi). Of this area, 1.92 km^{2} (0.74 sq mi) or 59.8% is used for agricultural purposes, while 1.02 km^{2} (0.39 sq mi) or 31.8% is forested. Of the rest of the land, 0.26 km^{2} (0.10 sq mi) or 8.1% is settled (buildings or roads).

Of the built up area, housing and buildings made up 3.4% and transportation infrastructure made up 4.0%. Out of the forested land, all of the forested land area is covered with heavy forests. Of the agricultural land, 41.7% is used for growing crops and 14.6% is pastures, while 3.4% is used for orchards or vine crops.

== Coat of arms ==
The blazon of the municipal coat of arms is Per pale Sable and Or, two corn ears counterchanged.

== Demographics ==
Wittinsburg has a population (as of June 2021) of 434. As of 2008, 3.6% of the population are resident foreign nationals. Over the last 10 years (1997–2007) the population has changed at a rate of 22.7%.

Most of the population (as of 2000) speaks German (326 or 97.3%), with Serbo-Croatian being second most common (5 or 1.5%) and French being third (1 or 0.3%).

As of 2008, the gender distribution of the population was 49.8% male and 50.2% female. The population was made up of 399 Swiss citizens (95.9% of the population), and 17 non-Swiss residents (4.1%) Of the population in the municipality 142 or about 42.4% were born in Wittinsburg and lived there in 2000. There were 100 or 29.9% who were born in the same canton, while 73 or 21.8% were born somewhere else in Switzerland, and 14 or 4.2% were born outside of Switzerland.

In 2008 there were 4 live births to Swiss citizens and were 3 deaths of Swiss citizens. Ignoring immigration and emigration, the population of Swiss citizens increased by 1 while the foreign population remained the same. There was 1 Swiss woman who immigrated back to Switzerland. At the same time, there was 1 non-Swiss man who immigrated from another country to Switzerland. The total Swiss population change in 2008 (from all sources, including moves across municipal borders) was an increase of 5 and the non-Swiss population decreased by 1 people. This represents a population growth rate of 1.0%.

The age distribution, as of 2010, in Wittinsburg is; 46 children or 11.1% of the population are between 0 and 6 years old and 74 teenagers or 17.8% are between 7 and 19. Of the adult population, 26 people or 6.3% of the population are between 20 and 29 years old. 62 people or 14.9% are between 30 and 39, 86 people or 20.7% are between 40 and 49, and 68 people or 16.3% are between 50 and 64. The senior population distribution is 40 people or 9.6% of the population are between 65 and 79 years old and there are 14 people or 3.4% who are over 80.

As of 2000, there were 131 people who were single and never married in the municipality. There were 185 married individuals, 9 widows or widowers and 10 individuals who are divorced.

As of 2000, there were 125 private households in the municipality, and an average of 2.6 persons per household. There were 21 households that consist of only one person and 10 households with five or more people. Out of a total of 129 households that answered this question, 16.3% were households made up of just one person and 2 were adults who lived with their parents. Of the rest of the households, there are 44 married couples without children, 53 married couples with children There were 2 single parents with a child or children. There were 3 households that were made up unrelated people and 4 households that were made some sort of institution or another collective housing.

In 2000 there were 58 single family homes (or 61.7% of the total) out of a total of 94 inhabited buildings. There were 19 multi-family buildings (20.2%), along with 16 multi-purpose buildings that were mostly used for housing (17.0%) and 1 other use buildings (commercial or industrial) that also had some housing (1.1%). Of the single family homes 9 were built before 1919, while 19 were built between 1990 and 2000. The greatest number of single family homes (11) were built between 1971 and 1980.

In 2000 there were 130 apartments in the municipality. The most common apartment size was 4 rooms of which there were 28. There were 3 single room apartments and 59 apartments with five or more rooms. Of these apartments, a total of 123 apartments (94.6% of the total) were permanently occupied, while 4 apartments (3.1%) were seasonally occupied and 3 apartments (2.3%) were empty. As of 2009, the construction rate of new housing units was 0 new units per 1000 residents. As of 2000 the average price to rent a two-room apartment was about .00 CHF (US$0, £0, €0), a three-room apartment was about .00 CHF (US$0, £0, €0) and a four-room apartment cost an average of .00 CHF (US$0, £0, €0). The vacancy rate for the municipality, in 2010, was 0.59%.

The historical population is given in the following chart:

== Politics ==
In the 2007 federal election the most popular party was the SVP which received 30.98% of the vote. The next three most popular parties were the Green Party (21.72%), the FDP (16.99%) and the SP (15.25%). In the federal election, a total of 152 votes were cast, and the voter turnout was 51.9%.

== Economy ==
As of 2010, Wittinsburg had an unemployment rate of 3.2%. As of 2008, there were 27 people employed in the primary economic sector and about 11 businesses involved in this sector. 71 people were employed in the secondary sector and there were 5 businesses in this sector. 32 people were employed in the tertiary sector, with 10 businesses in this sector. There were 173 residents of the municipality who were employed in some capacity, of which females made up 41.0% of the workforce.

In 2008 the total number of full-time equivalent jobs was 105. The number of jobs in the primary sector was 14, all of which were in agriculture. The number of jobs in the secondary sector was 66, of which 51 or (77.3%) were in manufacturing and 15 (22.7%) were in construction. The number of jobs in the tertiary sector was 25. In the tertiary sector; 4 or 16.0% were in wholesale or retail sales or the repair of motor vehicles, 6 or 24.0% were in a hotel or restaurant, 2 or 8.0% were technical professionals or scientists, 9 or 36.0% were in education and 3 or 12.0% were in health care.

In 2000, there were 15 workers who commuted into the municipality and 127 workers who commuted away. The municipality is a net exporter of workers, with about 8.5 workers leaving the municipality for every one entering. Of the working population, 11% used public transportation to get to work, and 63% used a private car.

== Religion ==
From the 2000 census, 23 or 6.9% were Roman Catholic, while 259 or 77.3% belonged to the Swiss Reformed Church. Of the rest of the population, there were 5 members of an Orthodox church (or about 1.49% of the population), and there were 19 individuals (or about 5.67% of the population) who belonged to another Christian church. There were 2 (or about 0.60% of the population) who were Islamic. 21 (or about 6.27% of the population) belonged to no church, are agnostic or atheist, and 6 individuals (or about 1.79% of the population) did not answer the question.

== Education ==
In Wittinsburg about 144 or (43.0%) of the population have completed non-mandatory upper secondary education, and 42 or (12.5%) have completed additional higher education (either university or a Fachhochschule). Of the 42 who completed tertiary schooling, 90.5% were Swiss men, 9.5% were Swiss women. As of 2000, there were 5 students in Wittinsburg who came from another municipality, while 41 residents attended schools outside the municipality.
