= Buckten railway station =

Railway station in Switzerland

Buckten
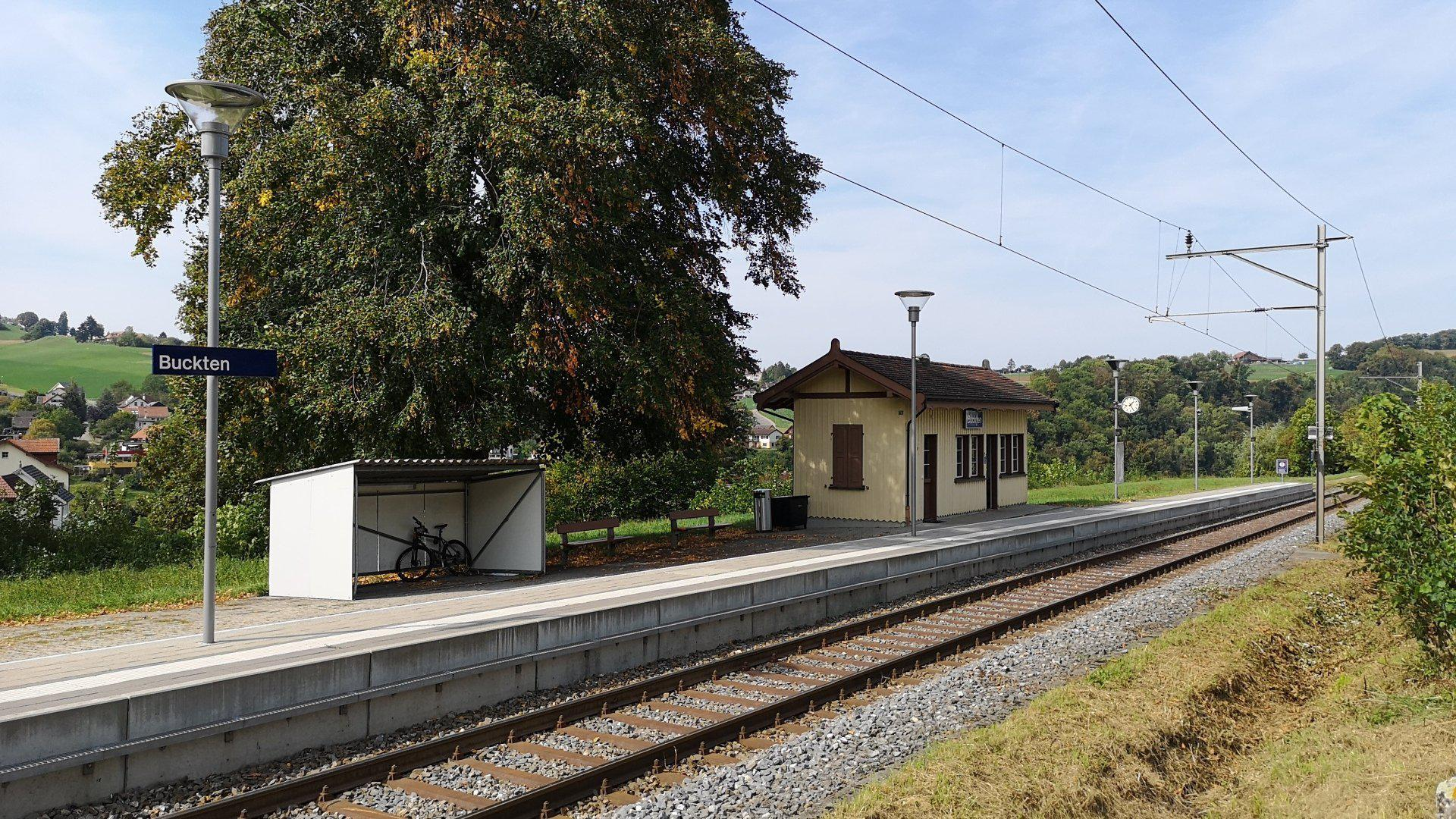
- The station in 2018

General information
- Location: Buckten; Switzerland
- Coordinates: 47°24′32.11″N 7°50′52.76″E
- Owner: Swiss Federal Railways
- Line: Hauenstein line
- Train operators: Swiss Federal Railways

Services
Preceding station	Basel S-Bahn	Following station
Rümlingen towards Sissach	S9	Läufelfingen towards Olten
Location
- Location within Switzerland

Buckten railway station (German: Bahnhof Buckten) is a railway station in the municipality of Buckten, in the Swiss canton of Basel-Landschaft. It is an intermediate stop on the summit branch of the Hauenstein line and is served by local trains only.

== Services ==
The following services stop at Buckten:

- Basel S-Bahn S9: hourly service between Sissach and Olten.
