= Grovana =

Swiss watch manufacturer

- Company type: Private
- Industry: Watchmaking
- Founded: 1924; 102 years ago
- Founders: Gröflin brothers
- Headquarters: Tenniken, Switzerland
- Key people: Christopher Bitterli
- Products: Watches
- Website: grovana.ch

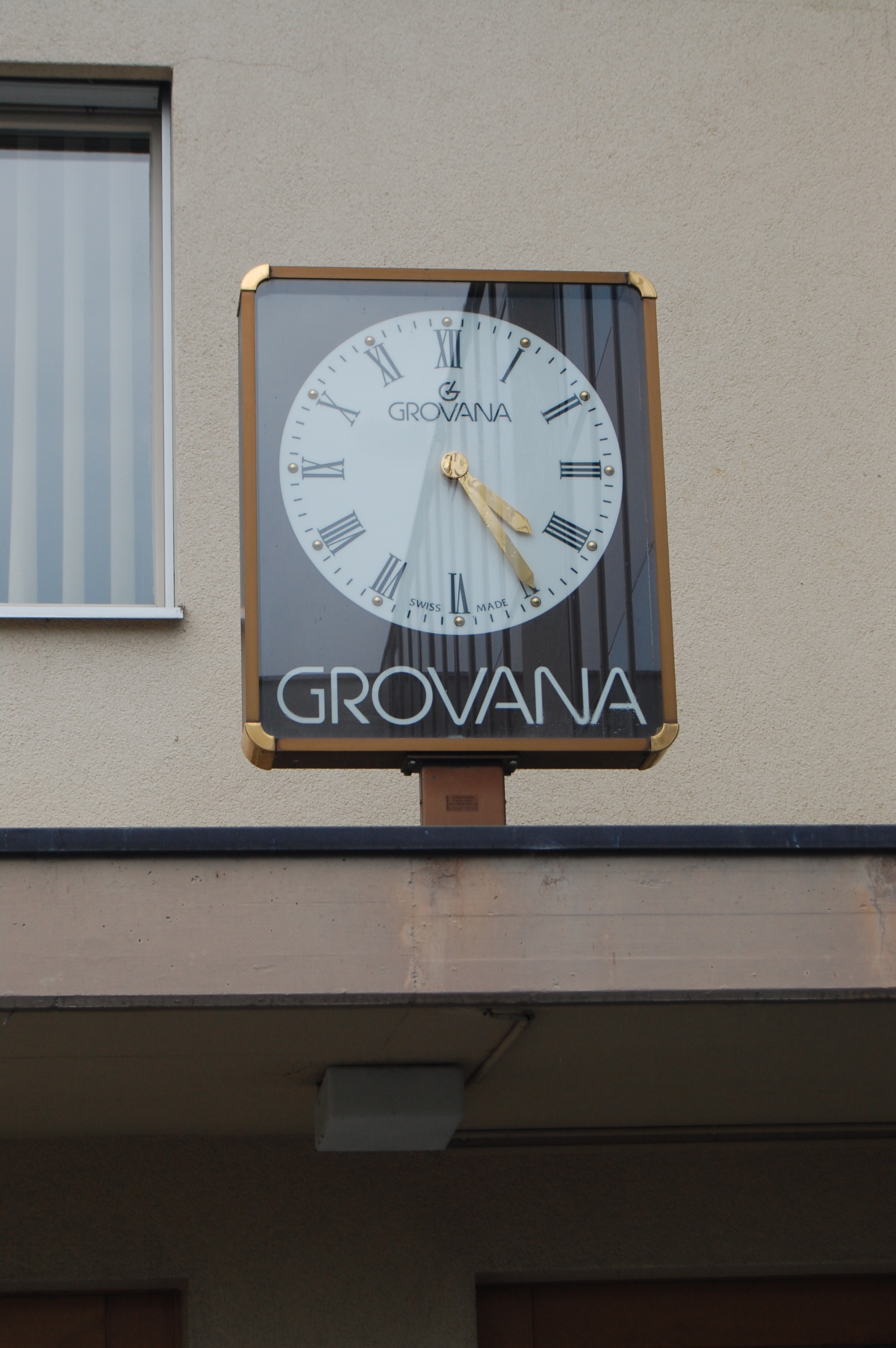
Grovana watch at headquarters

Grovana is a Swiss watch manufacturer, originally established in 1924 in Tenniken (Basel-Landschaft), Switzerland, about 16 kilometres (10 mi) south of Basel. Grovana is a private and family-owned company.

== Overview ==
In 2001, Grovana received a licence to produce Revue Thommen watches, which ended in 2014. The company employs 35 people in its headquarters.

Christopher Bitterli, the son of the company founder, became vice president in 1998 and has been president and CEO since 2009.

Grovana distributes its watches worldwide through retail and online distributors.

== Slogan ==
Grovana's corporate slogan is "Your Time is Our Tradition"
