= Rümlingen =

- Municipality
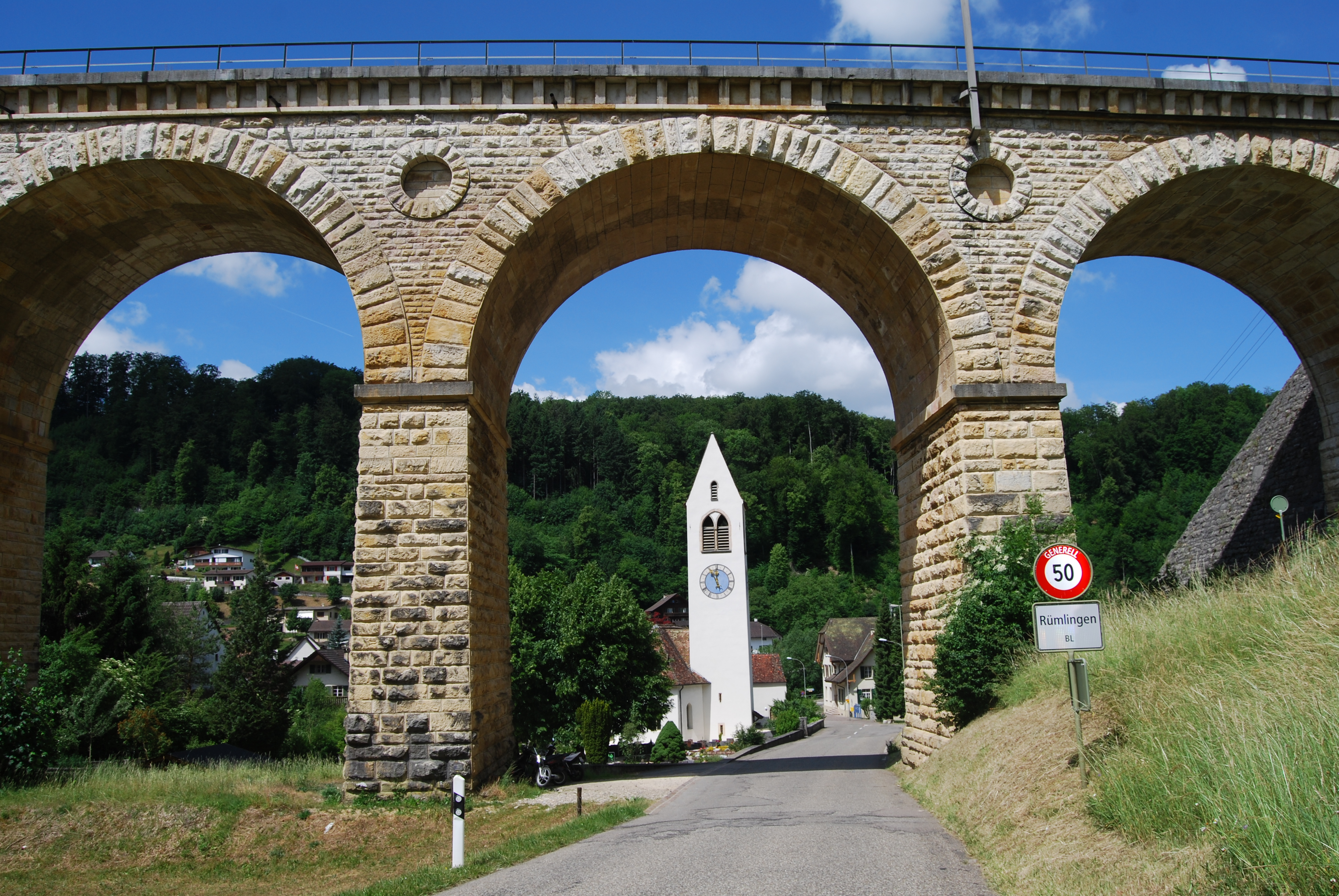

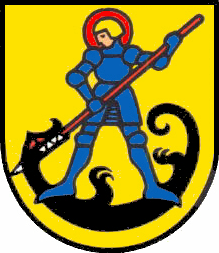
- Coat of arms
- Location of Rümlingen
- Location within Switzerland Location within Canton of Basel-Landschaft
- Coordinates: 47°26′N 7°51′E
- Country: Switzerland
- Canton: Basel-Landschaft
- District: Sissach

Area
  - Total: 2.28 km^{2} (0.88 sq mi)
- Elevation: 459 m (1,506 ft)

Population (June 2021)
  - Total: 444
  - Density: 195/km^{2} (504/sq mi)
- Time zone: UTC+01:00 (CET)
  - Summer (DST): UTC+02:00 (CEST)
- Postal code: 4444
- SFOS number: 2859
- ISO 3166 code: CH-BL
- Surrounded by: Buckten, Gelterkinden, Häfelfingen, Rünenberg, Wittinsburg
- Website: https://www.ruemlingen.ch SFSO statistics

Rümlingen is a municipality in the district of Sissach in the canton of Basel-Country in Switzerland.

== History ==
Rümlingen is first mentioned in 1358 as Rumelikon.

== Geography ==
Rümlingen has an area, as of 2009, of 2.28 square kilometers (0.88 sq mi). Of this area, 1,000.08 km^{2} (386.13 sq mi) or 47.4% is used for agricultural purposes, while 0.92 km^{2} (0.36 sq mi) or 40.4% is forested. Of the rest of the land, 0.24 km^{2} (0.093 sq mi) or 10.5% is settled (buildings or roads), 0.03 km^{2} (7.4 acres) or 1.3% is either rivers or lakes.

Of the built up area, industrial buildings made up 1.3% of the total area while housing and buildings made up 5.3% and transportation infrastructure made up 3.9%. Out of the forested land, all of the forested land area is covered with heavy forests. Of the agricultural land, 25.0% is used for growing crops and 18.9% is pastures, while 3.5% is used for orchards or vine crops. All the water in the municipality is flowing water.

The municipality is located in the Sissach district, in the Homburger valley.

== Coat of arms ==
The blazon of the municipal coat of arms is Or, St. George armoured Azure, haired of the first, haloed and holding a spear Gules topped Argent, slaying a Dragon Sable, toothed Argent and eyed Gules.

== Demographics ==
Rümlingen has a population (as of June 2021) of 444. As of 2008, 23.3% of the population are resident foreign nationals. Over the last 10 years (1997–2007) the population has changed at a rate of 9.6%.

Most of the population (as of 2000) speaks German (259 or 80.7%), with Serbo-Croatian being second most common (19 or 5.9%) and Albanian being third (18 or 5.6%). There is 1 person who speaks French.

As of 2008, the gender distribution of the population was 52.3% male and 47.7% female. The population was made up of 280 Swiss citizens (75.5% of the population), and 91 non-Swiss residents (24.5%) Of the population in the municipality 70 or about 21.8% were born in Rümlingen and lived there in 2000. There were 82 or 25.5% who were born in the same canton, while 84 or 26.2% were born somewhere else in Switzerland, and 79 or 24.6% were born outside of Switzerland.

In 2008 there were 2 live births to Swiss citizens and 1 death of a Swiss citizen. Ignoring immigration and emigration, the population of Swiss citizens increased by 1 while the foreign population remained the same. There was 1 non-Swiss man who immigrated from another country to Switzerland and 2 non-Swiss women who emigrated from Switzerland to another country. The total Swiss population change in 2008 (from all sources, including moves across municipal borders) was an increase of 24 and the non-Swiss population decreased by 2 people. This represents a population growth rate of 6.4%.

The age distribution, as of 2010, in Rümlingen is; 29 children or 7.8% of the population are between 0 and 6 years old and 46 teenagers or 12.4% are between 7 and 19. Of the adult population, 41 people or 11.1% of the population are between 20 and 29 years old. 53 people or 14.3% are between 30 and 39, 65 people or 17.5% are between 40 and 49, and 70 people or 18.9% are between 50 and 64. The senior population distribution is 49 people or 13.2% of the population are between 65 and 79 years old and there are 18 people or 4.9% who are over 80.

As of 2000, there were 126 people who were single and never married in the municipality. There were 156 married individuals, 29 widows or widowers and 10 individuals who are divorced.

As of 2000, there were 130 private households in the municipality, and an average of 2.4 persons per household. There were 38 households that consist of only one person and 10 households with five or more people. Out of a total of 133 households that answered this question, 28.6% were households made up of just one person and 1 were adults who lived with their parents. Of the rest of the households, there are 39 married couples without children, 41 married couples with children There were 6 single parents with a child or children. There were 5 households that were made up unrelated people and 3 households that were made some sort of institution or another collective housing.

In 2000 there were 54 single family homes (or 62.1% of the total) out of a total of 87 inhabited buildings. There were 16 multi-family buildings (18.4%), along with 15 multi-purpose buildings that were mostly used for housing (17.2%) and 2 other use buildings (commercial or industrial) that also had some housing (2.3%). Of the single family homes 6 were built before 1919, while 6 were built between 1990 and 2000. The greatest number of single family homes (14) were built between 1961 and 1970.

In 2000 there were 134 apartments in the municipality. The most common apartment size was 4 rooms of which there were 37. There were 1 single room apartments and 44 apartments with five or more rooms. Of these apartments, a total of 128 apartments (95.5% of the total) were permanently occupied, while 3 apartments (2.2%) were seasonally occupied and 3 apartments (2.2%) were empty. As of 2007, the construction rate of new housing units was 0 new units per 1000 residents. As of 2000 the average price to rent a two-room apartment was about 703.00 CHF (US$560, £320, €450), a three-room apartment was about 809.00 CHF (US$650, £360, €520) and a four-room apartment cost an average of 876.00 CHF (US$700, £390, €560). The vacancy rate for the municipality, in 2008, was 2.01%.

The historical population is given in the following chart:

== Heritage sites of national significance ==
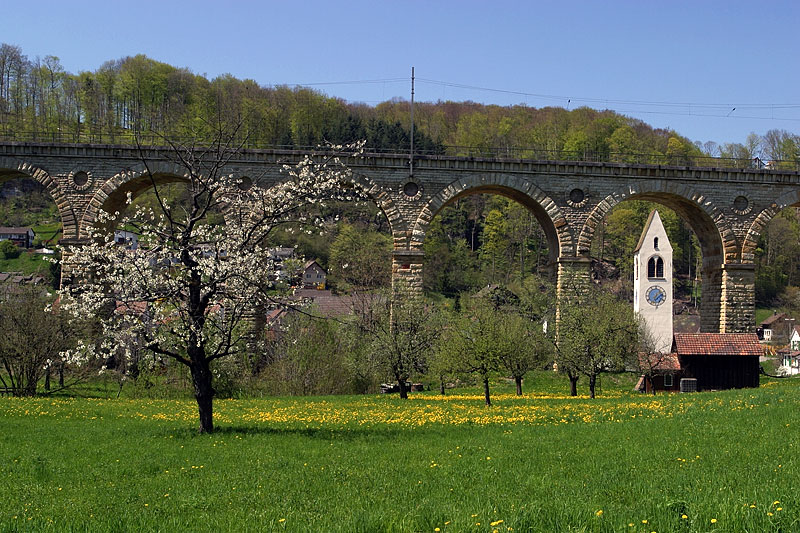
The railway bridge at Rümlingen

The Eisenbahnviadukt (Railroad Bridge) is listed as a Swiss heritage site of national significance. The entire village of Rümlingen is part of the Inventory of Swiss Heritage Sites.

== Politics ==
In the 2007 federal election the most popular party was the SVP which received 51.25% of the vote. The next three most popular parties were the SP (15.83%), the Green Party (13.19%) and the FDP (9.17%). In the federal election, a total of 104 votes were cast, and the voter turnout was 46.8%.

== Economy ==
As of 2007, Rümlingen had an unemployment rate of 2.56%. As of 2005, there were 18 people employed in the primary economic sector and about 8 businesses involved in this sector. 87 people were employed in the secondary sector and there were 7 businesses in this sector. 67 people were employed in the tertiary sector, with 11 businesses in this sector. There were 166 residents of the municipality who were employed in some capacity, of which females made up 40.4% of the workforce.

In 2008 the total number of full-time equivalent jobs was 126. The number of jobs in the primary sector was 8,all of which were in agriculture. The number of jobs in the secondary sector was 83, of which 57 or (68.7%) were in manufacturing and 26 (31.3%) were in construction. The number of jobs in the tertiary sector was 35. In the tertiary sector; 7 or 20.0% were in wholesale or retail sales or the repair of motor vehicles, 3 or 8.6% were in a hotel or restaurant, 1 was a technical professional or scientist, 16 or 45.7% were in education.

In 2000, there were 220 workers who commuted into the municipality and 116 workers who commuted away. The municipality is a net importer of workers, with about 1.9 workers entering the municipality for every one leaving. About 5.5% of the workforce coming into Rümlingen are coming from outside Switzerland. Of the working population, 24.7% used public transportation to get to work, and 45.8% used a private car.

== Religion ==
From the 2000 census, 44 or 13.7% were Roman Catholic, while 166 or 51.7% belonged to the Swiss Reformed Church. Of the rest of the population, there were 2 members of an Orthodox church (or about 0.62% of the population), there was 1 individual who belongs to the Christian Catholic Church, and there were 19 individuals (or about 5.92% of the population) who belonged to another Christian church. There were 53 (or about 16.51% of the population) who were Islamic. There were 2 individuals who were Hindu and 1 individual who belonged to another church. 29 (or about 9.03% of the population) belonged to no church, are agnostic or atheist, and 4 individuals (or about 1.25% of the population) did not answer the question.

== Transport ==
Rümlingen sits on the Hauenstein line and is served by trains at Rümlingen railway station.

== Education ==
In Rümlingen about 122 or (38.0%) of the population have completed non-mandatory upper secondary education, and 31 or (9.7%) have completed additional higher education (either university or a Fachhochschule). Of the 31 who completed tertiary schooling, 41.9% were Swiss men, 32.3% were Swiss women.

As of 2000, there were 98 students in Rümlingen who came from another municipality, while 22 residents attended schools outside the municipality.
