= Vertex Watches Limited =

British watchmaker

Coordinates: 51.506374°N 0.146759°W

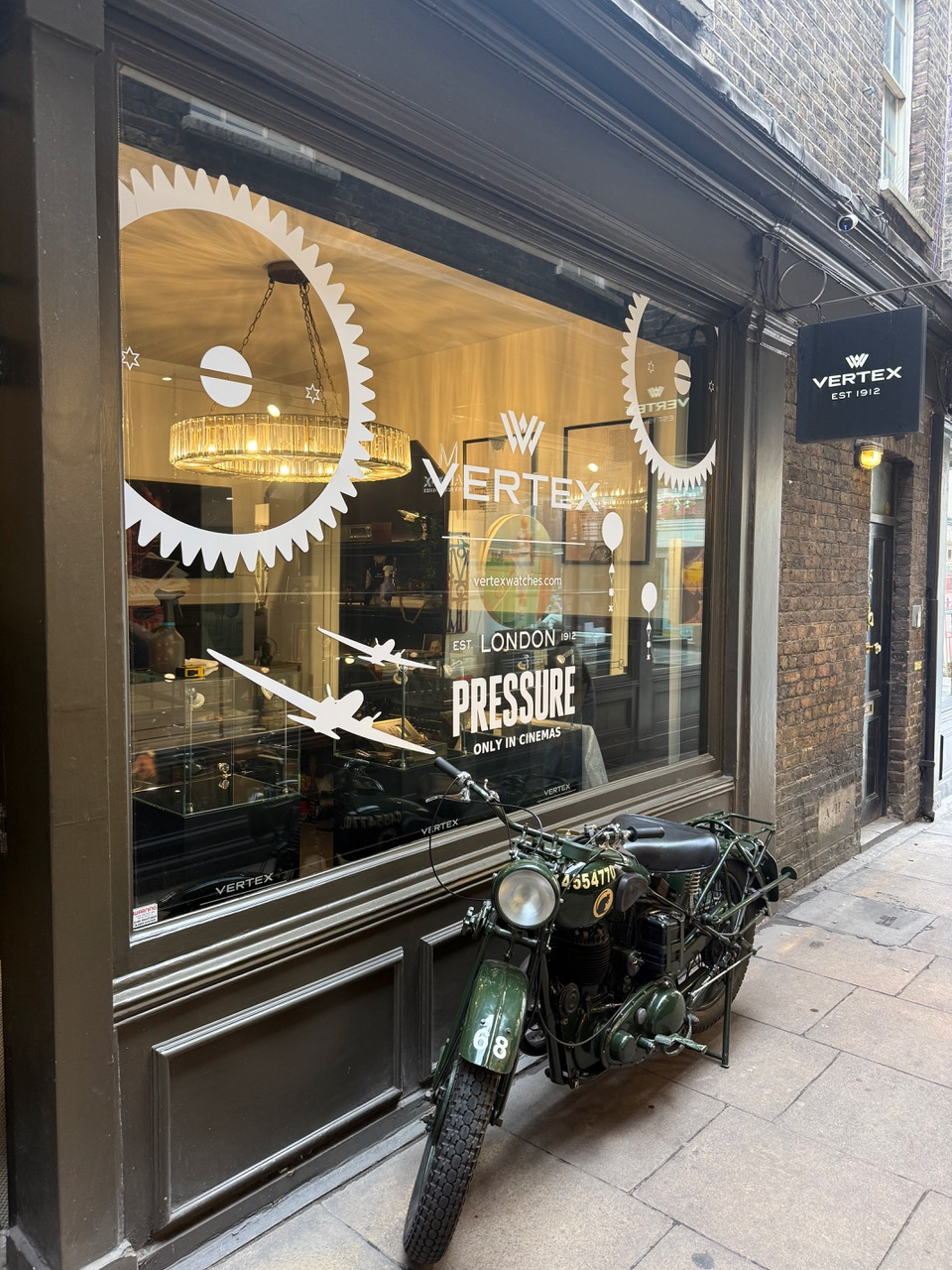
- Trade name: Vertex
- Type: Private
- Industry: Watchmaking
- Founded: 1912
- Founder: Claude Lyons
- Headquarters: Shepherd Market, London
- Key people: Don Cochrane Chairman
- Website: https://vertex-watches.com/

Vertex Watches Limited, or Vertex, is a British watchmaker based in London, United Kingdom.

== History ==
The company traces its origins to 1912 when Claude Lyons established the Dreadnought Watch Co. in Hatton Garden, London. In 1916, he registered the name Vertex for watches in both London and La Chaux-de-Fonds, Switzerland.

Early Vertex watches featured movements sourced from a range of manufacturers, housed inside cases produced by the Dennison Watch Case Company. Vertex later entered an agreement with Thommen A.G. under which Thommen manufactured and cased Vertex watches using Revue movements. The arrangement resulted in watches bearing both the Vertex and Revue names.

In 1940, the company's Hatton Garden showroom was damaged during a Blitz raid.

=== 'Dirty Dozen' ===
In 1941, Henry Lazarus, the company's then director and son-in-law of Claude Lyons, was selected to help source watches for troops in the Second World War. He had previously served as a captain during the First World War.

In 1943, the War Office developed a specification for a general-service wristwatch, R.S./Prov/437A. The specification, designated W.W.W. for 'Watches, Wristlet, Waterproof', required a waterproof case suitable for tropical conditions, luminous hands and hour markings, a black dial, and a non-magnetic lever movement with at least 15 jewels.

Twelve manufacturers supplied watches to the specification, Buren, Cyma, Eterna, Grana, Jaeger-LeCoultre, Lemania, Longines, IWC, Omega, Record, Timor, and Vertex. The group later became known among collectors as the 'Dirty Dozen'.

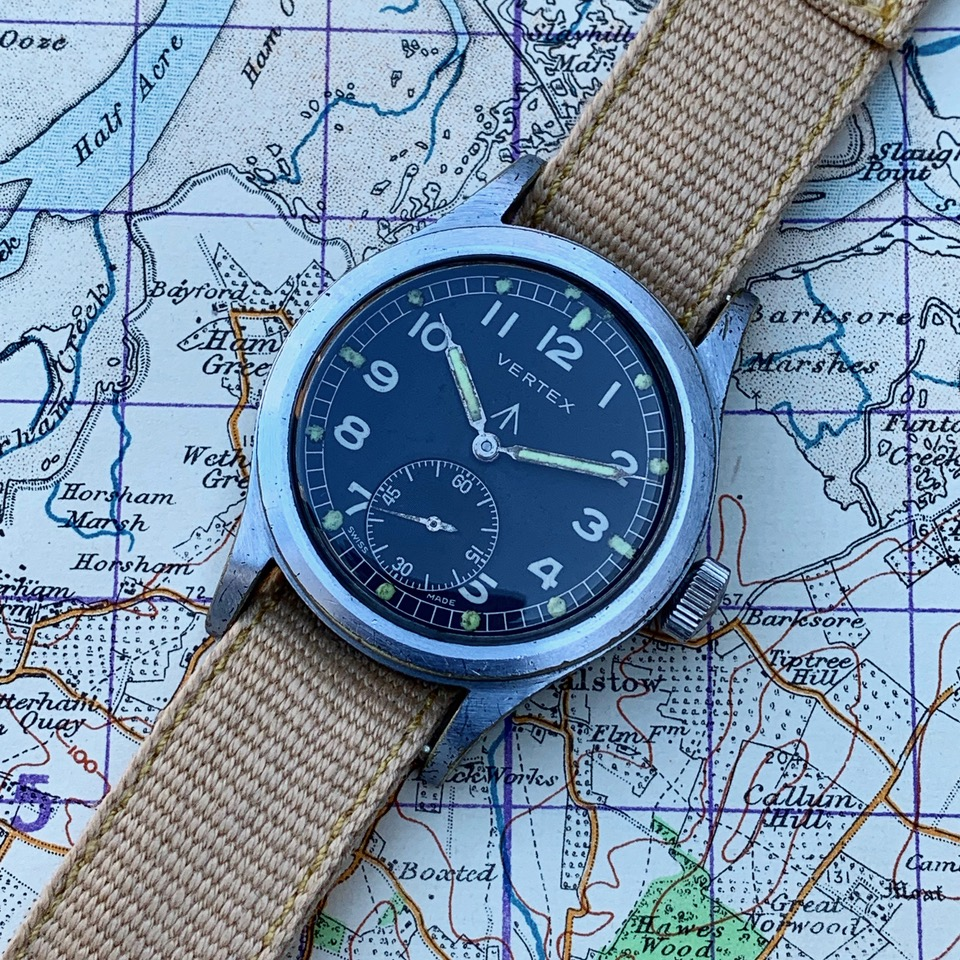
The Vertex Cal59

Vertex was the only British watch brand that supplied models under this specification. The company delivered an estimated 15,000 units in total, featuring the Calibre 59. Whilst the majority of watches produced by all 12 companies were delivered in 1945 and distributed in the Far East, 4,652 'Cal 59s' were delivered to troops ahead of the D-Day landings.

=== Closure ===
By the early 1970s, Vertex faced increasing competition from internationally marketed Swiss brands and changes in the watch industry associated with electronic and quartz movements. When the lease on its Hatton Garden premises came up for renewal, the owners elected to close the business. On 28 February 1972, an extraordinary meeting of Vertex Watches Limited resolved that the company be voluntarily wound up.

=== Revival ===
In 2015, Don Cochrane, the great-grandson of founder Claude Lyons, sought to revive the brand. When the company was dissolved, it did not retain any intellectual property, and Cochrane later discovered that the Vertex trademark belonged to the outdoor clothing company, Columbia. He later purchased this for use.

In 2016, the brand announced its first model, the M100, inspired by the W.W.W. Cal59. However, unlike the original model, the modern release featured a 40mm case, sapphire crystal and ETA movement.

Like the Cal59, the M100 featured a broad arrow, or pheon, on its dial, a symbol historically used to mark British government property. Its use on the modern watch required special permission from the Ministry of Defence.

The M100 was initially sold by invitation. Vertex issued 60 invitation codes to a selected group of customers, each of whom could refer a further five people. The sales model received both praise and criticism with outlet Hodinkee describing it as 'elitist and undemocratic'. Later models were made available for public purchase, albeit with limited production runs.

== Models ==
=== M100 ===
The M100 was later offered as the M100B, with a DLC coating, and in a 36 mm version, released in 2024 to mark the 80th anniversary of the D-Day landings, and also with a bronze case.

=== MP45 ===
In 2019, Vertex released the MP45, a monopusher chronograph inspired by an unrealised military model commissioned in 1945 for use by ordnance operators.

British car manufacturer Caterham collaborated with Vertex to celebrate its 50th anniversary with a limited-edition version of this model, featuring a tachymeter scale.

=== M60 AquaLion ===
In 2021, Vertex released its first diving watch since the revival of the brand, the M60 AquaLion. The 'AquaLion' name and logo had previously been used by the Dreadnought Watch Company.

In 2025, the brand released a limited blue-dialled edition of the watch named the 'Taormina' to celebrate British Watchmakers Day.

== In popular culture ==
In the 2026 James Bond continuation novel, King Zero by Charlie Higson, Bond wears a 'Cal 59' bestowed to him by a great uncle.

The MP45 features in season 2 of Netflix's The Gentleman, worn by Edie, portrayed by Theo James.
