= Thürnen =

- Municipality
- Coat of arms
- Location of Thürnen
- Location within Switzerland Location within Canton of Basel-Landschaft
- Coordinates: 47°27′N 7°50′E
- Country: Switzerland
- Canton: Basel-Landschaft
- District: Sissach

Area
  - Total: 2.25 km^{2} (0.87 sq mi)
- Elevation: 391 m (1,283 ft)

Population (June 2021)
  - Total: 1,397
  - Density: 621/km^{2} (1,610/sq mi)
- Time zone: UTC+01:00 (CET)
  - Summer (DST): UTC+02:00 (CEST)
- Postal code: 4441
- SFOS number: 2864
- ISO 3166 code: CH-BL
- Surrounded by: Böckten, Diepflingen, Gelterkinden, Sissach, Tenniken, Wittinsburg, Zunzgen
- Website: www.thuernen.ch

Thürnen is a municipality in the district of Sissach in the canton of Basel-Country in Switzerland.

== Geography ==
Thürnen has an area, as of 2009, of 2.25 square kilometers (0.87 sq mi). Of this area, 1.28 km^{2} (0.49 sq mi) or 56.9% is used for agricultural purposes, while 0.57 km^{2} (0.22 sq mi) or 25.3% is forested. Of the rest of the land, 0.42 km^{2} (0.16 sq mi) or 18.7% is settled (buildings or roads).

Of the built up area, housing and buildings made up 11.1% and transportation infrastructure made up 5.3%. Out of the forested land, 22.7% of the total land area is heavily forested and 2.7% is covered with orchards or small clusters of trees. Of the agricultural land, 16.4% is used for growing crops and 28.0% is pastures, while 12.4% is used for orchards or vine crops.

== Coat of arms ==
The blazon of the municipal coat of arms is Or, a two-arched towered Bridge Sable and Coupeaux Vert. The design was created in 1944. The castle in the coat of arms came from an oral tradition that held that the name Thürnen meant "at the towers". The colors come from the Homburg region, which once contained the municipality.

== Demographics ==
Thürnen has a population (as of June 2021) of 1,397. As of 2008, 18.2% of the population are resident foreign nationals. Over the last 10 years (1997–2007) the population has changed at a rate of 18.7%.

Most of the population (as of 2000) speaks German (1,041 or 89.2%), with Italian language being second most common (56 or 4.8%) and Serbo-Croatian being third (26 or 2.2%). There are 15 people who speak French.

As of 2008, the gender distribution of the population was 50.8% male and 49.2% female. The population was made up of 1,086 Swiss citizens (79.7% of the population), and 277 non-Swiss residents (20.3%) Of the population in the municipality 264 or about 22.6% were born in Thürnen and lived there in 2000. There were 413 or 35.4% who were born in the same canton, while 303 or 26.0% were born somewhere else in Switzerland, and 172 or 14.7% were born outside of Switzerland.

In 2008 there were 7 live births to Swiss citizens and 1 birth to non-Swiss citizens, and in same time span there were 4 deaths of Swiss citizens. Ignoring immigration and emigration, the population of Swiss citizens increased by 3 while the foreign population increased by 1. There was 1 Swiss woman who emigrated from Switzerland. At the same time, there were 8 non-Swiss men and 4 non-Swiss women who immigrated from another country to Switzerland. The total Swiss population change in 2008 (from all sources, including moves across municipal borders) was an increase of 30 and the non-Swiss population increased by 27 people. This represents a population growth rate of 4.5%.

The age distribution, as of 2010, in Thürnen is; 87 children or 6.4% of the population are between 0 and 6 years old and 191 teenagers or 14.0% are between 7 and 19. Of the adult population, 183 people or 13.4% of the population are between 20 and 29 years old. 170 people or 12.5% are between 30 and 39, 249 people or 18.3% are between 40 and 49, and 272 people or 20.0% are between 50 and 64. The senior population distribution is 160 people or 11.7% of the population are between 65 and 79 years old and there are 51 people or 3.7% who are over 80.

As of 2000, there were 434 people who were single and never married in the municipality. There were 575 married individuals, 76 widows or widowers and 82 individuals who are divorced.

As of 2000, there were 464 private households in the municipality, and an average of 2.4 persons per household. There were 130 households that consist of only one person and 25 households with five or more people. Out of a total of 470 households that answered this question, 27.7% were households made up of just one person and 3 were adults who lived with their parents. Of the rest of the households, there are 138 married couples without children, 153 married couples with children There were 31 single parents with a child or children. There were 9 households that were made up unrelated people and 6 households that were made some sort of institution or another collective housing.

In 2000 there were 189 single family homes (or 67.7% of the total) out of a total of 279 inhabited buildings. There were 51 multi-family buildings (18.3%), along with 30 multi-purpose buildings that were mostly used for housing (10.8%) and 9 other use buildings (commercial or industrial) that also had some housing (3.2%). Of the single family homes 16 were built before 1919, while 60 were built between 1990 and 2000.

In 2000 there were 490 apartments in the municipality. The most common apartment size was 4 rooms of which there were 187. There were 7 single room apartments and 168 apartments with five or more rooms. Of these apartments, a total of 449 apartments (91.6% of the total) were permanently occupied, while 19 apartments (3.9%) were seasonally occupied and 22 apartments (4.5%) were empty. As of 2009, the construction rate of new housing units was 0.7 new units per 1000 residents. As of 2000 the average price to rent a two-room apartment was about 886.00 CHF (US$710, £400, €570), a three-room apartment was about 986.00 CHF (US$790, £440, €630) and a four-room apartment cost an average of 1155.00 CHF (US$920, £520, €740). The vacancy rate for the municipality, in 2010, was 0.17%.

The historical population is given in the following chart:

== Politics ==
In the 2007 federal election the most popular party was the SVP which received 38.82% of the vote. The next three most popular parties were the SP (19.47%), the FDP (18.12%) and the Green Party (14.7%). In the federal election, a total of 387 votes were cast, and the voter turnout was 45.5%.

== Economy ==
As of 2010, Thürnen had an unemployment rate of 3.9%. As of 2008, there were 20 people employed in the primary economic sector and about 7 businesses involved in this sector. 100 people were employed in the secondary sector and there were 9 businesses in this sector. 145 people were employed in the tertiary sector, with 25 businesses in this sector. There were 634 residents of the municipality who were employed in some capacity, of which females made up 44.8% of the workforce.

In 2008 the total number of full-time equivalent jobs was 202. The number of jobs in the primary sector was 14, all of which were in agriculture. The number of jobs in the secondary sector was 90, of which 65 or (72.2%) were in manufacturing and 26 (28.9%) were in construction. The number of jobs in the tertiary sector was 98. In the tertiary sector; 20 or 20.4% were in wholesale or retail sales or the repair of motor vehicles, 5 or 5.1% were in the movement and storage of goods, 4 or 4.1% were in a hotel or restaurant, 2 or 2.0% were in the information industry, 9 or 9.2% were technical professionals or scientists, 7 or 7.1% were in education and 43 or 43.9% were in health care.

In 2000, there were 134 workers who commuted into the municipality and 513 workers who commuted away. The municipality is a net exporter of workers, with about 3.8 workers leaving the municipality for every one entering. Of the working population, 21.8% used public transportation to get to work, and 53.9% used a private car.

== Religion ==
From the 2000 census, 268 or 23.0% were Roman Catholic, while 718 or 61.5% belonged to the Swiss Reformed Church. Of the rest of the population, there was 1 member of an Orthodox church who belonged, there were 2 individuals (or about 0.17% of the population) who belonged to the Christian Catholic Church, and there were 18 individuals (or about 1.54% of the population) who belonged to another Christian church. There were 52 (or about 4.46% of the population) who were Islamic. 101 (or about 8.65% of the population) belonged to no church, are agnostic or atheist, and 6 individuals (or about 0.51% of the population) did not answer the question.

== Education ==
In Thürnen about 507 or (43.4%) of the population have completed non-mandatory upper secondary education, and 100 or (8.6%) have completed additional higher education (either university or a Fachhochschule). Of the 100 who completed tertiary schooling, 69.0% were Swiss men, 17.0% were Swiss women, 8.0% were non-Swiss men and 6.0% were non-Swiss women.

As of 2000, there were 73 students from Thürnen who attended schools outside the municipality.
