= Rümlingen railway station =

Railway station in Basel-Landschaft, Switzerland

Rümlingen
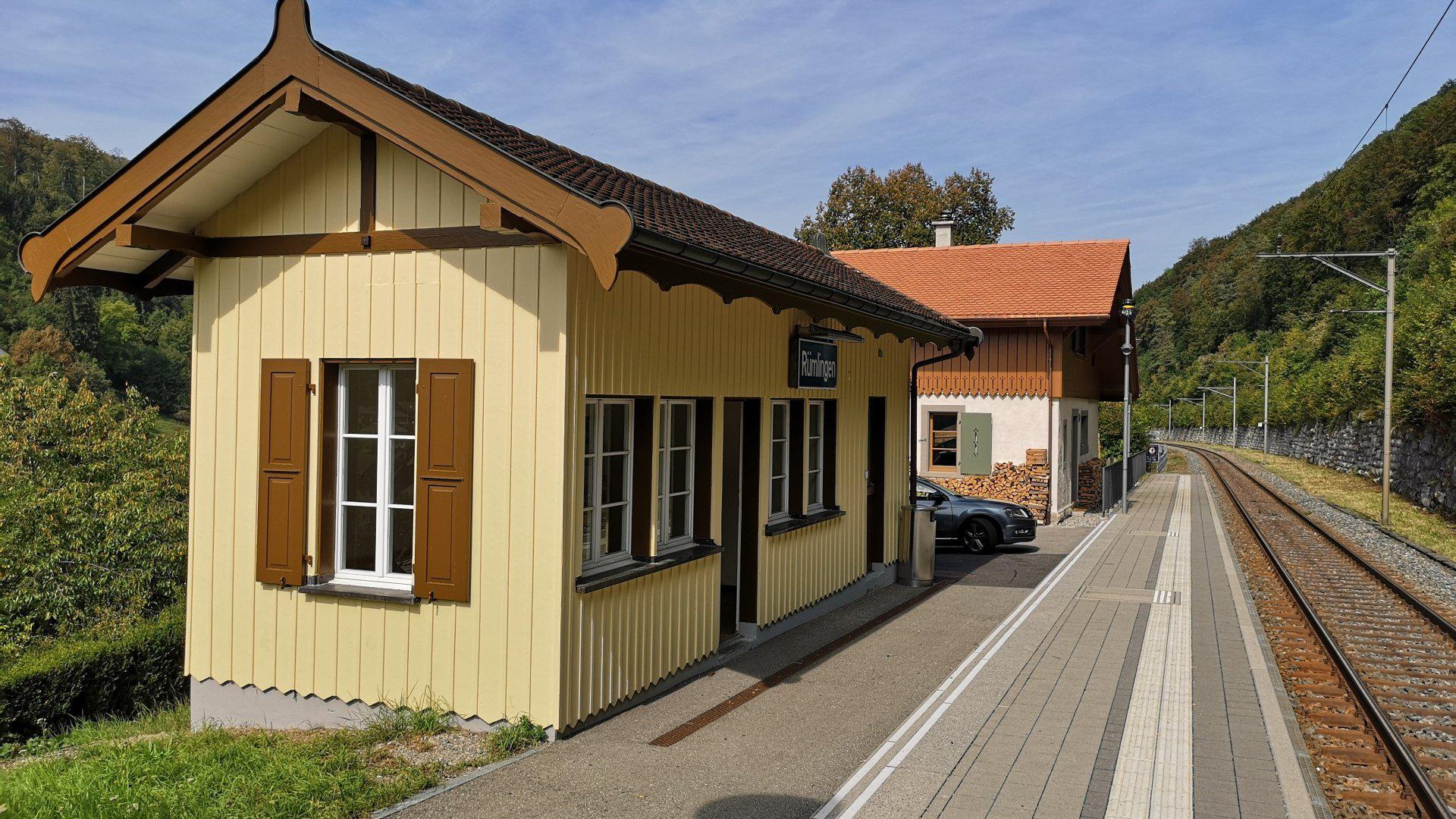
- The station in 2018

General information
- Location: Rümlingen; Switzerland
- Coordinates: 47°25′31.30″N 7°51′2.20″E
- Owner: Swiss Federal Railways
- Line: Hauenstein line
- Train operators: Swiss Federal Railways

Services
Preceding station	Basel S-Bahn	Following station
Sommerau towards Sissach	S9	Buckten towards Olten
Location
- Location within Switzerland

Rümlingen railway station (German: Bahnhof Rümlingen) is a railway station in the municipality of Rümlingen, in the Swiss canton of Basel-Landschaft. It is an intermediate stop on the summit branch of the Hauenstein line and is served by local trains only.

== Services ==
The following services stop at Rümlingen:

- Basel S-Bahn S9: hourly service between Sissach and Olten.
