= Gelterkinden =

- Municipality
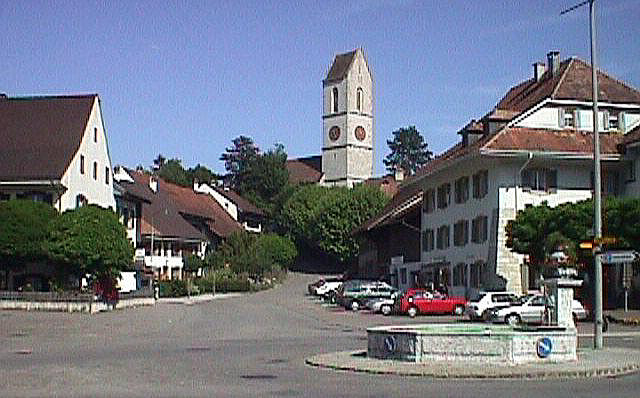

- Flag Coat of arms
- Location of Gelterkinden
- Location within Switzerland Location within Canton of Basel-Landschaft
- Coordinates: 47°27′N 7°50′E
- Country: Switzerland
- Canton: Basel-Landschaft
- District: Sissach

Area
  - Total: 9.79 km^{2} (3.78 sq mi)
- Elevation: 404 m (1,325 ft)

Population (June 2021)
  - Total: 6,252
  - Density: 639/km^{2} (1,650/sq mi)
- Time zone: UTC+01:00 (CET)
  - Summer (DST): UTC+02:00 (CEST)
- Postal code: 4460
- SFOS number: 2846
- ISO 3166 code: CH-BL
- Surrounded by: Böckten, Diepflingen, Ormalingen, Rickenbach, Rümlingen, Rünenberg, Tecknau, Thürnen, Wittinsburg
- Website: gelterkinden.ch

Gelterkinden is a municipality in the district of Sissach in the canton of Basel-Country in Switzerland.

== History ==
Gelterkinden is first mentioned between 1101–03 as Gelterkingen.

== Geography ==
Aerial view (1966)

Gelterkinden has an area, as of 2009, of 9.79 square kilometers (3.78 sq mi). Of this area, 3.35 km^{2} (1.29 sq mi) or 34.2% is used for agricultural purposes, while 4.64 km^{2} (1.79 sq mi) or 47.4% is forested. Of the rest of the land, 1.78 km^{2} (0.69 sq mi) or 18.2% is settled (buildings or roads), 0.03 km^{2} (7.4 acres) or 0.3% is either rivers or lakes and 0.02 km^{2} (4.9 acres) or 0.2% is unproductive land.

Of the built up area, industrial buildings made up 2.1% of the total area while housing and buildings made up 10.5% and transportation infrastructure made up 4.2%. Out of the forested land, 45.6% of the total land area is heavily forested and 1.8% is covered with orchards or small clusters of trees. Of the agricultural land, 12.7% is used for growing crops and 17.8% is pastures, while 3.8% is used for orchards or vine crops. All the water in the municipality is flowing water.

The municipality is located in the Sissach district. The main village is located in the upper Ergolz valley at the confluence of the Ergolz and Eibach. It consists of the village of Gelterkinden and more than 20 other settlements including Sommerau, which has its own train station.

== Coat of arms ==
The blazon of the municipal coat of arms is Trierced per pale, Azure, Argent and Gules.

== Demographics ==
Gelterkinden has a population (as of June 2021) of 6,252. As of 2008, 15.7% of the population are resident foreign nationals. Over the last 10 years (1997–2007) the population has changed at a rate of 5.8%.

Most of the population (as of 2000) speaks German (4,805 or 87.7%), with Italian language being second most common (173 or 3.2%) and Serbo-Croatian being third (120 or 2.2%). There are 47 people who speak French and 4 people who speak Romansh.

As of 2008, the gender distribution of the population was 48.7% male and 51.3% female. The population was made up of 4,782 Swiss citizens (83.4% of the population), and 954 non-Swiss residents (16.6%) Of the population in the municipality 1,559 or about 28.5% were born in Gelterkinden and lived there in 2000. There were 1,398 or 25.5% who were born in the same canton, while 1,365 or 24.9% were born somewhere else in Switzerland, and 987 or 18.0% were born outside of Switzerland.

In 2008 there were 48 live births to Swiss citizens and 8 births to non-Swiss citizens, and in same time span there were 41 deaths of Swiss citizens and 2 non-Swiss citizen deaths. Ignoring immigration and emigration, the population of Swiss citizens increased by 7 while the foreign population increased by 6. There were 5 Swiss men and 2 Swiss women who immigrated back to Switzerland. At the same time, there were 17 non-Swiss men and 19 non-Swiss women who immigrated from another country to Switzerland. The total Swiss population change in 2008 (from all sources, including moves across municipal borders) was an increase of 49 and the non-Swiss population increased by 24 people. This represents a population growth rate of 1.3%.

The age distribution, as of 2010, in Gelterkinden is; 351 children or 6.1% of the population are between 0 and 6 years old and 865 teenagers or 15.1% are between 7 and 19. Of the adult population, 772 people or 13.5% of the population are between 20 and 29 years old. 682 people or 11.9% are between 30 and 39, 863 people or 15.0% are between 40 and 49, and 1,175 people or 20.5% are between 50 and 64. The senior population distribution is 736 people or 12.8% of the population are between 65 and 79 years old and there are 292 people or 5.1% who are over 80.

As of 2000, there were 2,243 people who were single and never married in the municipality. There were 2,693 married individuals, 316 widows or widowers and 224 individuals who are divorced.

As of 2000, there were 2,208 private households in the municipality, and an average of 2.4 persons per household. There were 653 households that consist of only one person and 166 households with five or more people. Out of a total of 2,239 households that answered this question, 29.2% were households made up of just one person and 17 were adults who lived with their parents. Of the rest of the households, there are 694 married couples without children, 708 married couples with children There were 114 single parents with a child or children. There were 22 households that were made up unrelated people and 31 households that were made some sort of institution or another collective housing.

In 2000 there were 904 single family homes (or 65.4% of the total) out of a total of 1,383 inhabited buildings. There were 237 multi-family buildings (17.1%), along with 156 multi-purpose buildings that were mostly used for housing (11.3%) and 86 other use buildings (commercial or industrial) that also had some housing (6.2%). Of the single family homes 64 were built before 1919, while 163 were built between 1990 and 2000. The greatest number of single family homes (201) were built between 1971 and 1980.

In 2000 there were 2,324 apartments in the municipality. The most common apartment size was 4 rooms of which there were 718. There were 46 single room apartments and 812 apartments with five or more rooms. Of these apartments, a total of 2,144 apartments (92.3% of the total) were permanently occupied, while 108 apartments (4.6%) were seasonally occupied and 72 apartments (3.1%) were empty. As of 2007, the construction rate of new housing units was 5.4 new units per 1000 residents. As of 2000 the average price to rent a two-room apartment was about 778.00 CHF (US$620, £350, €500), a three-room apartment was about 943.00 CHF (US$750, £420, €600) and a four-room apartment cost an average of 1186.00 CHF (US$950, £530, €760). The vacancy rate for the municipality, in 2008, was 0.32%.

The historical population is given in the following chart:

== Sights ==
The entire village of Gelterkinden is designated as part of the Inventory of Swiss Heritage Sites.

== Politics ==
In the 2007 federal election the most popular party was the SVP which received 28.99% of the vote. The next three most popular parties were the SP (28.09%), the FDP (18.21%) and the Green Party (14.97%). In the federal election, a total of 2,005 votes were cast, and the voter turnout was 52.2%.

== Economy ==
As of 2007, Gelterkinden had an unemployment rate of 1.93%. As of 2005, there were 67 people employed in the primary economic sector and about 22 businesses involved in this sector. 404 people were employed in the secondary sector and there were 70 businesses in this sector. 1,823 people were employed in the tertiary sector, with 241 businesses in this sector. There were 2,780 residents of the municipality who were employed in some capacity, of which females made up 43.1% of the workforce.

In 2008 the total number of full-time equivalent jobs was 1,715. The number of jobs in the primary sector was 27, of which 26 were in agriculture and 1 was in forestry or lumber production. The number of jobs in the secondary sector was 369, of which 107 or (29.0%) were in manufacturing and 251 (68.0%) were in construction. The number of jobs in the tertiary sector was 1,319. In the tertiary sector; 354 or 26.8% were in wholesale or retail sales or the repair of motor vehicles, 105 or 8.0% were in the movement and storage of goods, 33 or 2.5% were in a hotel or restaurant, 11 or 0.8% were in the information industry, 46 or 3.5% were the insurance or financial industry, 113 or 8.6% were technical professionals or scientists, 208 or 15.8% were in education and 299 or 22.7% were in health care.

In 2000, there were 1,374 workers who commuted into the municipality and 1,904 workers who commuted away. The municipality is a net exporter of workers, with about 1.4 workers leaving the municipality for every one entering. About 3.3% of the workforce coming into Gelterkinden are coming from outside Switzerland, while 0.1% of the locals commute out of Switzerland for work. Of the working population, 25.8% used public transportation to get to work, and 38.2% used a private car.

== Religion ==
From the 2000 census, 1,248 or 22.8% were Roman Catholic, while 2,946 or 53.8% belonged to the Swiss Reformed Church. Of the rest of the population, there were 87 members of an Orthodox church (or about 1.59% of the population), there were 16 individuals (or about 0.29% of the population) who belonged to the Christian Catholic Church, and there were 143 individuals (or about 2.61% of the population) who belonged to another Christian church. There were 377 (or about 6.88% of the population) who were Islamic. There were 10 individuals who were Buddhist, 11 individuals who were Hindu and 3 individuals who belonged to another church. 509 (or about 9.30% of the population) belonged to no church, are agnostic or atheist, and 126 individuals (or about 2.30% of the population) did not answer the question.

== Transport ==
Gelterkinden sits on the Hauenstein line and is served by trains at Gelterkinden railway station. The station of Sommerau also lies within the municipality, in the village of the same name.

== Education ==
In Gelterkinden about 2,090 or (38.2%) of the population have completed non-mandatory upper secondary education, and 665 or (12.1%) have completed additional higher education (either university or a Fachhochschule). Of the 665 who completed tertiary schooling, 67.2% were Swiss men, 23.6% were Swiss women, 5.1% were non-Swiss men and 4.1% were non-Swiss women.

As of 2000, there were 406 students in Gelterkinden who came from another municipality, while 152 residents attended schools outside the municipality.
