= Waterproof wristlet watch =

A typical example of a waterproof wristlet watch
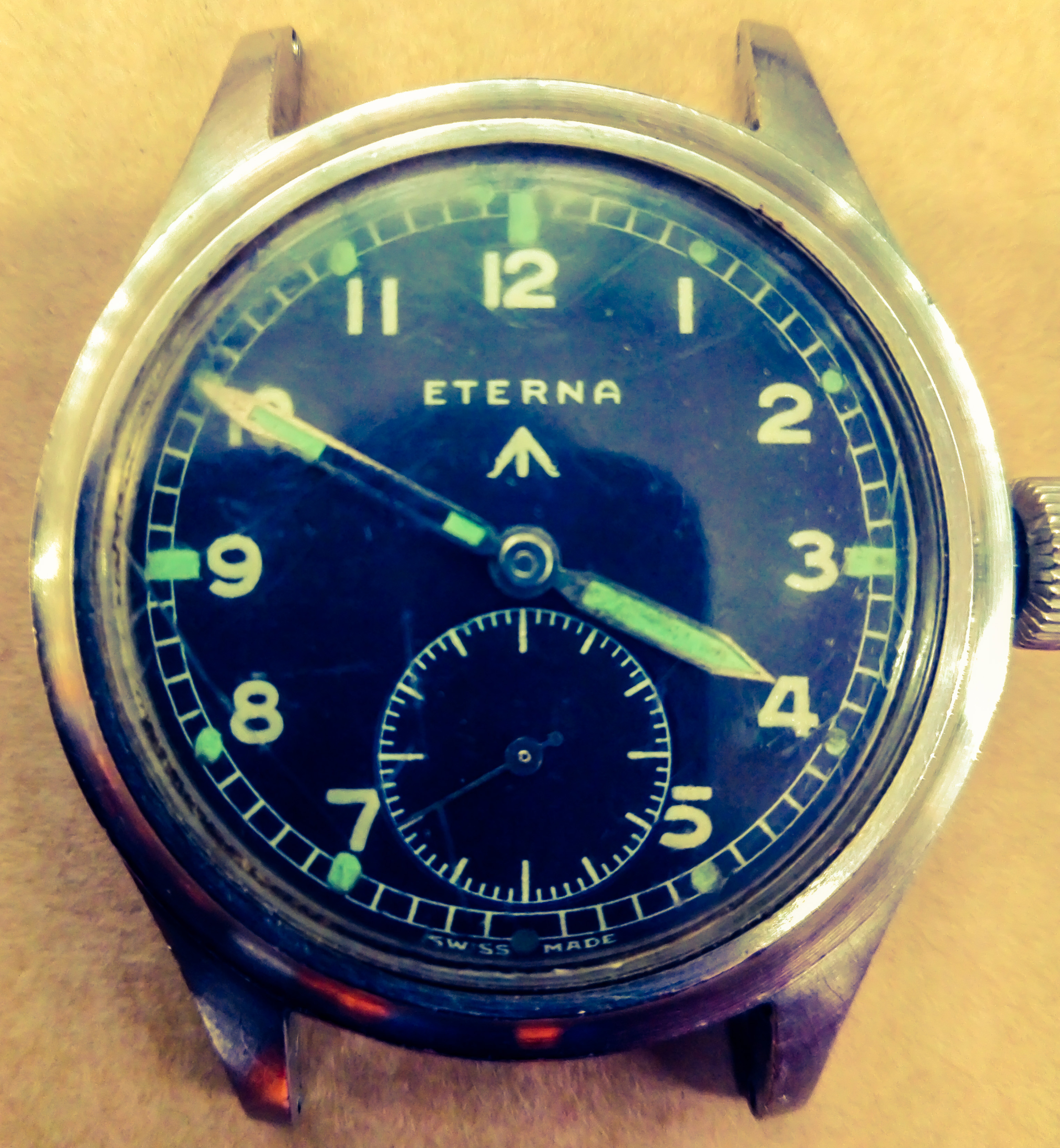
- An unrestored and original W.W.W. manufactured by Eterna. Eterna produced an estimated 5,000 of the total 145,000 delivered.
- Type: Manual
- Display: Analogue
- Introduced: 1945

The watch wristlet waterproof was a type of watch manufactured in Switzerland and issued to British military forces after 1945. The (WWW) standard for wristwatches by the Ministry of Defence (United Kingdom) is believed to be one of the first official standards for a military issue watch.

== Development ==
Timekeeping in disciplines such as navigation and warfare has always been of vital importance. Mechanisms for telling things such as direction, star position, and time on boats date back to antiquity, but World War I was the first time that soldiers wore timepieces on their wrists in the form of trench watches. The obvious characteristics of a trench watch were that they were repurposed small sized (size 0, 7.5 Ligne, 29.62mm) pocket watches protected with crude metal used to protect the glass crystal covering the dial. The invention of the trench watch precipitated the invention of the wrist watch, and these watches were adopted by both the public and the military.

In the period before, and during World War II, the British Ministry of Supply purchased watches manufactured for the civilian retail trade for use by troops. These were classified as Army Trade Pattern watches, and were engraved 'ATP' on the dial or caseback.

== W.W.W. standard ==
The ATP watches were considered insufficient for military needs by the War Office, which led to the development of the specification R.S./Prov/4373A, which became known as W.W.W., standing for 'watches, wristlet, waterproof'. Whilst the specification was formally approved in 1945, manufacturers were invited to provide watches to this specification as early as 1943.

The specification required that watches be manufactured with a matte black dial with luminescent hands, numbers and indices, subsidiary seconds, a shatter-resistant perspex plastic crystal, a case resistant to water, dust and shock, a high-quality, isochronal and robust, 15 jewel movement, and a water-resistant winding crown of a good size.

== Manufacturers ==
Twelve companies (Buren, Cyma, Eterna, Grana, IWC, Jaeger-LeCoultre, Lemania, Longines, Omega, Record, Timor, Vertex) responded with conforming designs for what are commonly called WWWs, Mark X (after the IWC version), or colloquially 'the Dirty Dozen'. All featured the typical British military broad arrow on both the dial and the case back.

The watches delivered and movements used by each manufacturer.
| Manufacturer | Movement | Production |
|---|---|---|
| Buren | 462 | 11,000 |
| Cyma | 234 | 20,000 |
| Eterna | 520 | 5,000 |
| Grana | KF320 | 1,000 to 5,000 |
| Jaeger-LeCoultre | 479 | 6,000 |
| Lemania | 27A | 10,000 |
| Longines | 12.68Z | 8,000 |
| IWC | 83 | 5,000 |
| Omega | 30T2 | 25,000 |
| Record | 022K | 25,000 |
| Timor | 6060 | 13,000 |
| Vertex | 59 | 15,000 |

== Delivery ==
The majority of W.W.W. watches were delivered from May 1945 onwards, mostly to troops in the Far East, some models were delivered as early as 1944.
