= Diepflingen =

- Municipality
- Coat of arms
- Location of Diepflingen
- Location within Switzerland Location within Canton of Basel-Landschaft
- Coordinates: 47°27′N 7°50′E
- Country: Switzerland
- Canton: Basel-Landschaft
- District: Sissach

Area
  - Total: 1.44 km^{2} (0.56 sq mi)
- Elevation: 411 m (1,348 ft)

Population (June 2021)
  - Total: 765
  - Density: 531/km^{2} (1,380/sq mi)
- Time zone: UTC+01:00 (CET)
  - Summer (DST): UTC+02:00 (CEST)
- Postal code: 4442
- SFOS number: 2845
- ISO 3166 code: CH-BL
- Surrounded by: Gelterkinden, Tenniken, Thürnen, Wittinsburg
- Website: diepflingen.ch

Diepflingen is a municipality in the district of Sissach in the canton of Basel-Country in Switzerland.

== History ==
Diepflingen is first mentioned in 1251 as Dyephlinchon.

Diepflingen gained some fame during the separation of Basel-Country from Basel-City by putting itself directly under federal rule, thus proclaiming the Republic Diepflingen. The Swiss Diet (Tagsatzung), however, didn't accept this, and after only 9 days the Republic was renounced and Diepflingen joined Basel-Country.

== Geography ==
Aerial view from 3000 m by Walter Mittelholzer (1923)

Diepflingen has an area, as of 2009, of 1.44 square kilometers (0.56 sq mi). Of this area, 0.47 km^{2} (0.18 sq mi) or 32.6% is used for agricultural purposes, while 0.76 km^{2} (0.29 sq mi) or 52.8% is forested. Of the rest of the land, 0.18 km^{2} (0.069 sq mi) or 12.5% is settled (buildings or roads), 0.01 km^{2} (2.5 acres) or 0.7% is either rivers or lakes.

Of the built up area, housing and buildings made up 6.3% and transportation infrastructure made up 5.6%. Out of the forested land, 50.7% of the total land area is heavily forested and 2.1% is covered with orchards or small clusters of trees. Of the agricultural land, 12.5% is used for growing crops and 18.1% is pastures, while 2.1% is used for orchards or vine crops. All the water in the municipality is flowing water.

The municipality is located in the Sissach district, on the right side of the Homburger stream on the old road over the lower Hauenstein.

== Coat of arms ==
The blazon of the municipal coat of arms is On a base vert an argent tower-wall with gules gate and roof before sable background.

== Demographics ==
Diepflingen has a population (as of June 2021) of 765. As of 2008, 12.4% of the population are resident foreign nationals. Over the last 10 years (1997–2007) the population has changed at a rate of 14.1%.

Most of the population (as of 2000) speaks German (449 or 88.7%), with Serbo-Croatian being second most common (18 or 3.6%) and Turkish being third (17 or 3.4%).

As of 2008, the gender distribution of the population was 48.6% male and 51.4% female. The population was made up of 497 Swiss citizens (86.3% of the population), and 79 non-Swiss residents (13.7%) Of the population in the municipality 98 or about 19.4% were born in Diepflingen and lived there in 2000. There were 181 or 35.8% who were born in the same canton, while 133 or 26.3% were born somewhere else in Switzerland, and 87 or 17.2% were born outside of Switzerland.

In 2008 there were 5 live births to Swiss citizens and 2 births to non-Swiss citizens, and in same time span there were 5 deaths of Swiss citizens. Ignoring immigration and emigration, the population of Swiss citizens remained the same while the foreign population increased by 2. There were 4 Swiss women who immigrated back to Switzerland. At the same time, there was 1 non-Swiss man and 2 non-Swiss women who immigrated from another country to Switzerland. The total Swiss population change in 2008 (from all sources, including moves across municipal borders) was an increase of 14 and the non-Swiss population remained the same. This represents a population growth rate of 2.6%.

The age distribution, as of 2010, in Diepflingen is; 46 children or 8.0% of the population are between 0 and 6 years old and 97 teenagers or 16.8% are between 7 and 19. Of the adult population, 57 people or 9.9% of the population are between 20 and 29 years old. 66 people or 11.5% are between 30 and 39, 118 people or 20.5% are between 40 and 49, and 104 people or 18.1% are between 50 and 64. The senior population distribution is 73 people or 12.7% of the population are between 65 and 79 years old and there are 15 people or 2.6% who are over 80.

As of 2000, there were 207 people who were single and never married in the municipality. There were 267 married individuals, 19 widows or widowers and 13 individuals who are divorced.

As of 2000, there were 197 private households in the municipality, and an average of 2.6 persons per household. There were 39 households that consist of only one person and 18 households with five or more people. Out of a total of 198 households that answered this question, 19.7% were households made up of just one person and 5 were adults who lived with their parents. Of the rest of the households, there are 71 married couples without children, 69 married couples with children There were 10 single parents with a child or children. There were 3 households that were made up unrelated people and 1 household that was made some sort of institution or another collective housing.

In 2000 there were 122 single family homes (or 76.7% of the total) out of a total of 159 inhabited buildings. There were 18 multi-family buildings (11.3%), along with 11 multi-purpose buildings that were mostly used for housing (6.9%) and 8 other use buildings (commercial or industrial) that also had some housing (5.0%). Of the single family homes 13 were built before 1919, while 31 were built between 1990 and 2000. The greatest number of single family homes (31) were built between 1971 and 1980.

In 2000 there were 203 apartments in the municipality. The most common apartment size was 5 rooms of which there were 58. There were 3 single room apartments and 91 apartments with five or more rooms. Of these apartments, a total of 196 apartments (96.6% of the total) were permanently occupied, while 4 apartments (2.0%) were seasonally occupied and 3 apartments (1.5%) were empty. As of 2007, the construction rate of new housing units was 0 new units per 1000 residents. As of 2000 the average price to rent a two-room apartment was about 715.00 CHF (US$570, £320, €460), a three-room apartment was about 994.00 CHF (US$800, £450, €640) and a four-room apartment cost an average of 1270.00 CHF (US$1020, £570, €810). The vacancy rate for the municipality, in 2008, was 0%.

The historical population is given in the following chart:

== Politics ==
In the 2007 federal election the most popular party was the SVP which received 48.06% of the vote. The next three most popular parties were the SP (15.01%), the FDP (14.54%) and the Green Party (14.07%). In the federal election, a total of 187 votes were cast, and the voter turnout was 51.2%.

== Economy ==
As of 2007, Diepflingen had an unemployment rate of 1.57%. As of 2005, there were 6 people employed in the primary economic sector and about 1 business involved in this sector. 96 people were employed in the secondary sector and there were 11 businesses in this sector. 42 people were employed in the tertiary sector, with 8 businesses in this sector. There were 280 residents of the municipality who were employed in some capacity, of which females made up 38.2% of the workforce.

In 2008 the total number of full-time equivalent jobs was 117. The number of jobs in the primary sector was, all of which were in agriculture. The number of jobs in the secondary sector was 74, of which 49 or (66.2%) were in manufacturing and 26 (35.1%) were in construction. The number of jobs in the tertiary sector was 43. In the tertiary sector; 15 or 34.9% were in wholesale or retail sales or the repair of motor vehicles, 3 or 7.0% were in a hotel or restaurant, 12 or 27.9% were technical professionals or scientists, 5 or 11.6% were in education.

In 2000, there were 77 workers who commuted into the municipality and 229 workers who commuted away. The municipality is a net exporter of workers, with about 3.0 workers leaving the municipality for every one entering. Of the working population, 20.4% used public transportation to get to work, and 53.9% used a private car.

== Religion ==
From the 2000 census, 113 or 22.3% were Roman Catholic, while 290 or 57.3% belonged to the Swiss Reformed Church. Of the rest of the population, there was 1 member of an Orthodox church who belonged, there were 4 individuals (or about 0.79% of the population) who belonged to the Christian Catholic Church, and there were 10 individuals (or about 1.98% of the population) who belonged to another Christian church. There were 43 (or about 8.50% of the population) who were Islamic. There were 2 individuals who were Buddhist. 38 (or about 7.51% of the population) belonged to no church, are agnostic or atheist, and 5 individuals (or about 0.99% of the population) did not answer the question.

== Transport ==
Diepflingen sits on the Hauenstein line and is served by trains at Diepflingen railway station.

== Education ==
In Diepflingen about 218 or (43.1%) of the population have completed non-mandatory upper secondary education, and 63 or (12.5%) have completed additional higher education (either university or a Fachhochschule). Of the 63 who completed tertiary schooling, 66.7% were Swiss men, 14.3% were Swiss women, 12.7% were non-Swiss men.

As of 2000, there was one student in Diepflingen who came from another municipality, while 37 residents attended schools outside the municipality.
