= Känerkinden =

- Municipality
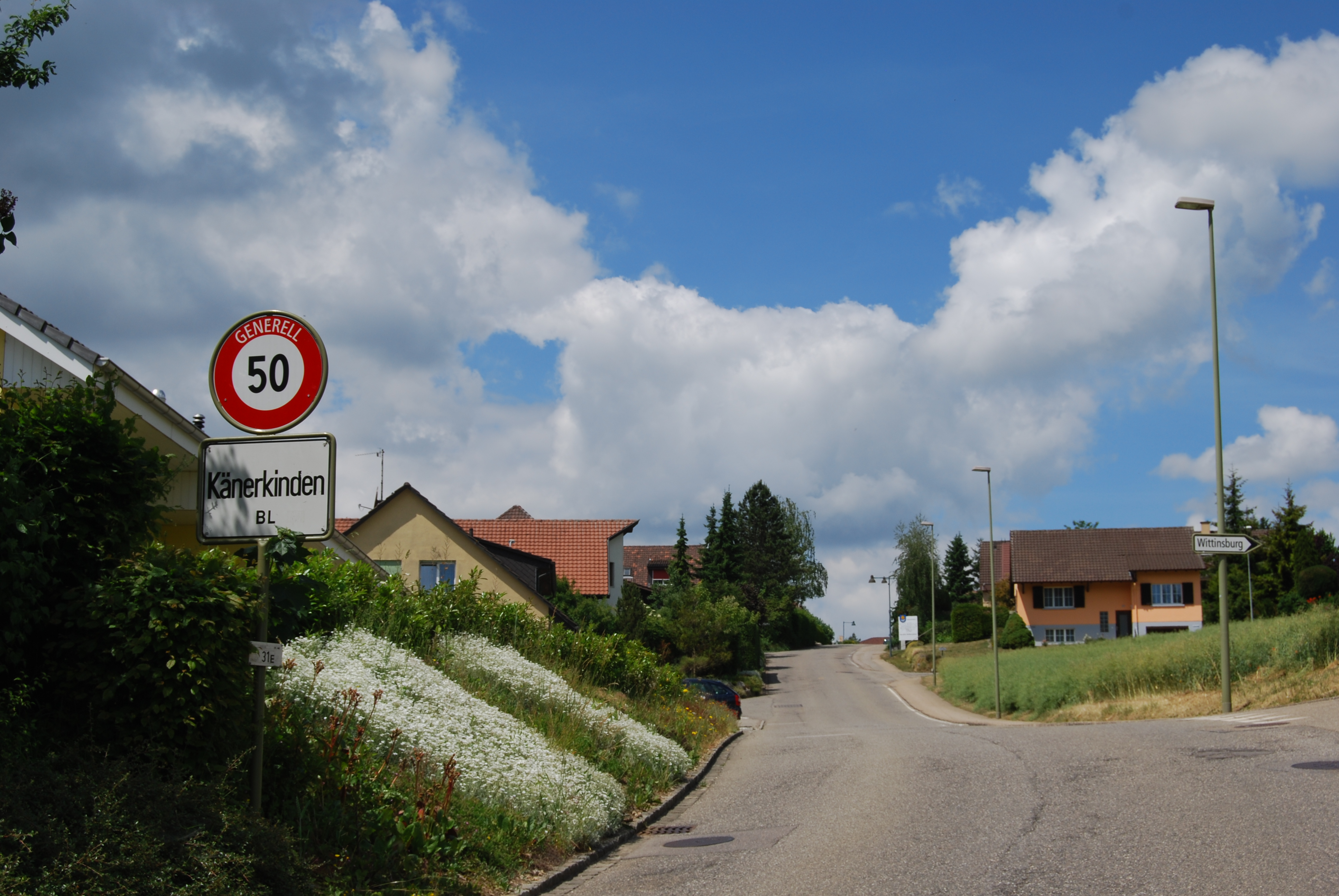

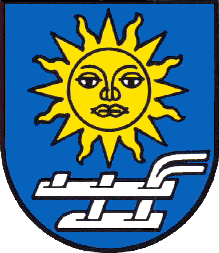
- Coat of arms
- Location of Känerkinden
- Location within Switzerland Location within Canton of Basel-Landschaft
- Coordinates: 47°25′N 7°50′E
- Country: Switzerland
- Canton: Basel-Landschaft
- District: Sissach

Area
  - Total: 1.48 km^{2} (0.57 sq mi)
- Elevation: 551 m (1,808 ft)

Population (June 2021)
  - Total: 527
  - Density: 356/km^{2} (922/sq mi)
- Time zone: UTC+01:00 (CET)
  - Summer (DST): UTC+02:00 (CEST)
- Postal code: 4447
- SFOS number: 2850
- ISO 3166 code: CH-BL
- Surrounded by: Buckten, Diegten, Läufelfingen, Wittinsburg
- Website: kaenerkinden.ch

Känerkinden is a municipality in the district of Sissach in the canton of Basel-Country in Switzerland.

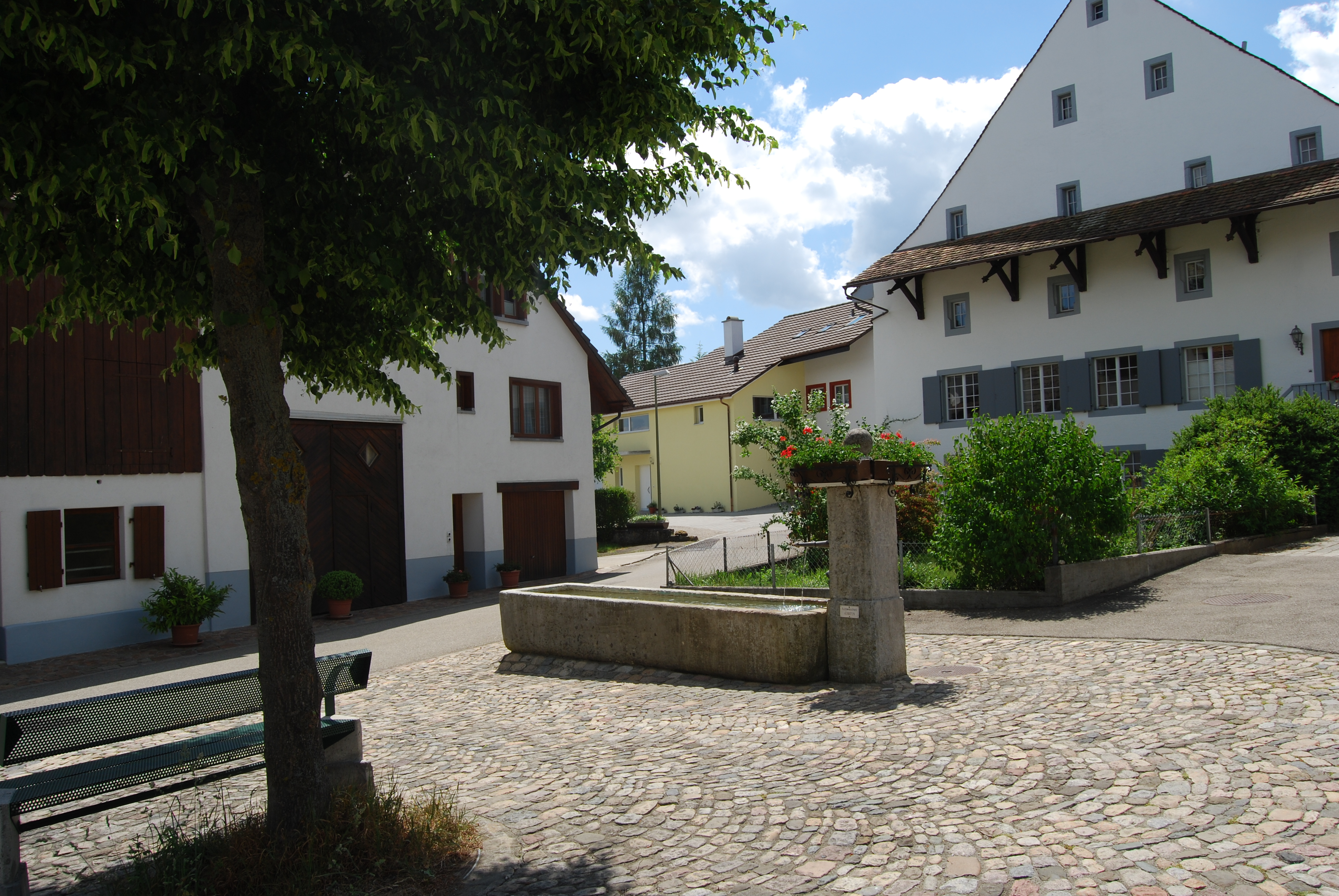
Känerkinden

== History ==
Känerkinden is first mentioned in 1359 as Kennichingen.

== Geography ==
Känerkinden has an area, as of 2009, of 1.48 square kilometers (0.57 sq mi). Of this area, 1.01 km^{2} (0.39 sq mi) or 68.2% is used for agricultural purposes, while 0.2 km^{2} (0.077 sq mi) or 13.5% is forested. Of the rest of the land, 0.23 km^{2} (0.089 sq mi) or 15.5% is settled (buildings or roads).

Of the built up area, housing and buildings made up 11.5% and transportation infrastructure made up 2.0%. Power and water infrastructure as well as other special developed areas made up 1.4% of the area. Out of the forested land, all of the forested land area is covered with heavy forests. Of the agricultural land, 52.0% is used for growing crops and 7.4% is pastures, while 8.8% is used for orchards or vine crops.

The municipality is located in the Sissach district, in a small depression in the Jura Mountains between the Diegter valley and the Homburger valley.

== Coat of arms ==
The blazon of the municipal coat of arms is Azure, a Sun Or, in base a Plough Argent.

== Demographics ==
Känerkinden has a population (as of June 2021) of 527. As of 2008, 8.2% of the population are resident foreign nationals. Over the last 10 years (1997–2007) the population has changed at a rate of -0.2%.

Most of the population (as of 2000) speaks German (443 or 91.5%), with Italian language being second most common (16 or 3.3%) and French being third (8 or 1.7%). There is 1 person who speaks Romansh.

As of 2008, the gender distribution of the population was 51.1% male and 48.9% female. The population was made up of 446 Swiss citizens (90.1% of the population), and 49 non-Swiss residents (9.9%) Of the population in the municipality 127 or about 26.2% were born in Känerkinden and lived there in 2000. There were 139 or 28.7% who were born in the same canton, while 135 or 27.9% were born somewhere else in Switzerland, and 80 or 16.5% were born outside of Switzerland.

In 2008 there were 3 live births to Swiss citizens and 1 birth to non-Swiss citizens, and in same time span there were 3 deaths of Swiss citizens. Ignoring immigration and emigration, the population of Swiss citizens remained the same while the foreign population increased by 1. There were 3 non-Swiss men who immigrated from another country to Switzerland and 1 non-Swiss woman who emigrated from Switzerland to another country. The total Swiss population change in 2008 (from all sources, including moves across municipal borders) was a decrease of 4 and the non-Swiss population increased by 7 people. This represents a population growth rate of 0.6%.

The age distribution, as of 2010, in Känerkinden is; 34 children or 6.9% of the population are between 0 and 6 years old and 68 teenagers or 13.7% are between 7 and 19. Of the adult population, 35 people or 7.1% of the population are between 20 and 29 years old. 45 people or 9.1% are between 30 and 39, 82 people or 16.6% are between 40 and 49, and 132 people or 26.7% are between 50 and 64. The senior population distribution is 68 people or 13.7% of the population are between 65 and 79 years old and there are 31 people or 6.3% who are over 80.

As of 2000, there were 176 people who were single and never married in the municipality. There were 273 married individuals, 15 widows or widowers and 20 individuals who are divorced.

As of 2000, there were 195 private households in the municipality, and an average of 2.5 persons per household. There were 46 households that consist of only one person and 12 households with five or more people. Out of a total of 196 households that answered this question, 23.5% were households made up of just one person and 1 was an adult who lived with their parents. Of the rest of the households, there are 71 married couples without children, 66 married couples with children There were 3 single parents with a child or children. There were 8 households that were made up unrelated people and 1 household that was made some sort of institution or another collective housing.

In 2000 there were 132 single family homes (or 80.0% of the total) out of a total of 165 inhabited buildings. There were 15 multi-family buildings (9.1%), along with 16 multi-purpose buildings that were mostly used for housing (9.7%) and 2 other use buildings (commercial or industrial) that also had some housing (1.2%). Of the single family homes 3 were built before 1919, while 34 were built between 1990 and 2000. The greatest number of single family homes (38) were built between 1981 and 1990.

In 2000 there were 202 apartments in the municipality. The most common apartment size was 4 rooms of which there were 63. There was 1 single room apartments and 97 apartments with five or more rooms. Of these apartments, a total of 189 apartments (93.6% of the total) were permanently occupied, while 8 apartments (4.0%) were seasonally occupied and 5 apartments (2.5%) were empty. As of 2007, the construction rate of new housing units was 0 new units per 1000 residents. As of 2000 the average price to rent a two-room apartment was about .00 CHF (US$0, £0, €0), a three-room apartment was about 858.00 CHF (US$690, £390, €550) and a four-room apartment cost an average of .00 CHF (US$0, £0, €0). The vacancy rate for the municipality, in 2008, was 0.49%.

The historical population is given in the following chart:

== Politics ==
In the 2007 federal election the most popular party was the SVP which received 35.81% of the vote. The next three most popular parties were the SP (21.09%), the FDP (16.12%) and the Green Party (13.81%). In the federal election, a total of 209 votes were cast, and the voter turnout was 54.3%.

== Economy ==
As of 2007, Känerkinden had an unemployment rate of 2.22%. As of 2005, there were 14 people employed in the primary economic sector and about 5 businesses involved in this sector. 6 people were employed in the secondary sector and there were 3 businesses in this sector. 18 people were employed in the tertiary sector, with 8 businesses in this sector. There were 251 residents of the municipality who were employed in some capacity, of which females made up 37.8% of the workforce.

In 2008 the total number of full-time equivalent jobs was 34. The number of jobs in the primary sector was 11, all of which were in agriculture. The number of jobs in the secondary sector was 4, of which or (0.0%) were in manufacturing and 4 (100.0%) were in construction. The number of jobs in the tertiary sector was 19. In the tertiary sector; 1 or 5.3% were in wholesale or retail sales or the repair of motor vehicles, 6 or 31.6% were in the movement and storage of goods, 2 or 10.5% were in a hotel or restaurant, 7 or 36.8% were in education.

In 2000, there were 8 workers who commuted into the municipality and 210 workers who commuted away. The municipality is a net exporter of workers, with about 26.3 workers leaving the municipality for every one entering. Of the working population, 16.7% used public transportation to get to work, and 64.5% used a private car.

== Religion ==
From the 2000 census, 92 or 19.0% were Roman Catholic, while 306 or 63.2% belonged to the Swiss Reformed Church. Of the rest of the population, there were 2 members of an Orthodox church (or about 0.41% of the population), there were 2 individuals (or about 0.41% of the population) who belonged to the Christian Catholic Church, and there were 10 individuals (or about 2.07% of the population) who belonged to another Christian church. There were 14 (or about 2.89% of the population) who were Islamic and 1 individual who belonged to another church. 54 (or about 11.16% of the population) belonged to no church, are agnostic or atheist, and 3 individuals (or about 0.62% of the population) did not answer the question.

== Education ==
In Känerkinden about 202 or (41.7%) of the population have completed non-mandatory upper secondary education, and 76 or (15.7%) have completed additional higher education (either university or a Fachhochschule). Of the 76 who completed tertiary schooling, 57.9% were Swiss men, 14.5% were Swiss women, 19.7% were non-Swiss men and 7.9% were non-Swiss women.

As of 2000, there were 13 students in Känerkinden who came from another municipality, while 47 residents attended schools outside the municipality.
