= Buckten =

- Municipality
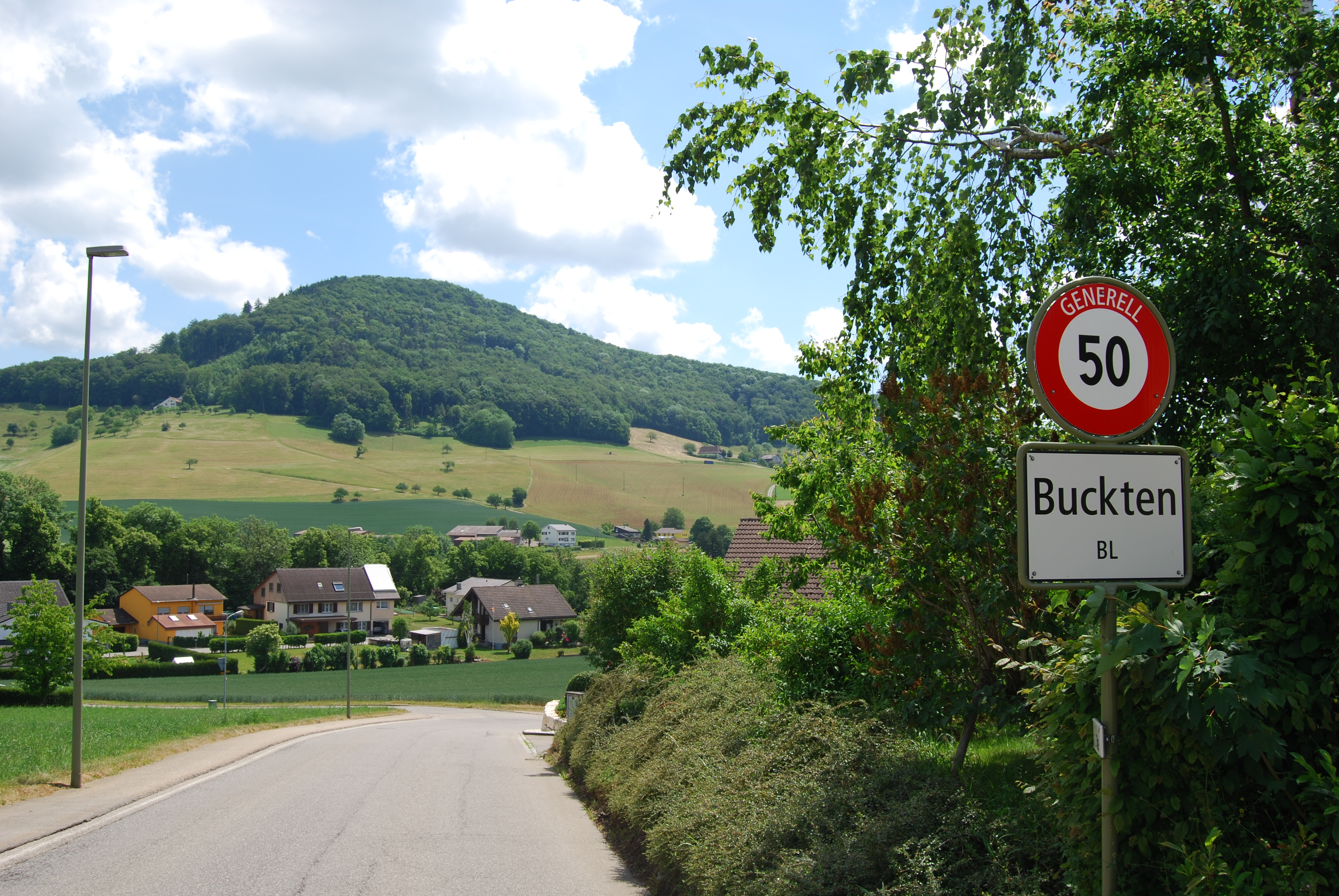

- Coat of arms
- Location of Buckten
- Location within Switzerland Location within Canton of Basel-Landschaft
- Coordinates: 47°24′N 7°51′E
- Country: Switzerland
- Canton: Basel-Landschaft
- District: Sissach

Area
  - Total: 1.99 km^{2} (0.77 sq mi)
- Elevation: 480 m (1,570 ft)

Population (June 2021)
  - Total: 708
  - Density: 356/km^{2} (921/sq mi)
- Time zone: UTC+01:00 (CET)
  - Summer (DST): UTC+02:00 (CEST)
- Postal code: 4446
- SFOS number: 2843
- ISO 3166 code: CH-BL
- Surrounded by: Häfelfingen, Känerkinden, Läufelfingen, Rümlingen, Wittinsburg
- Website: buckten.ch

Buckten is a municipality in the district of Sissach in the canton of Basel-Country in Switzerland.

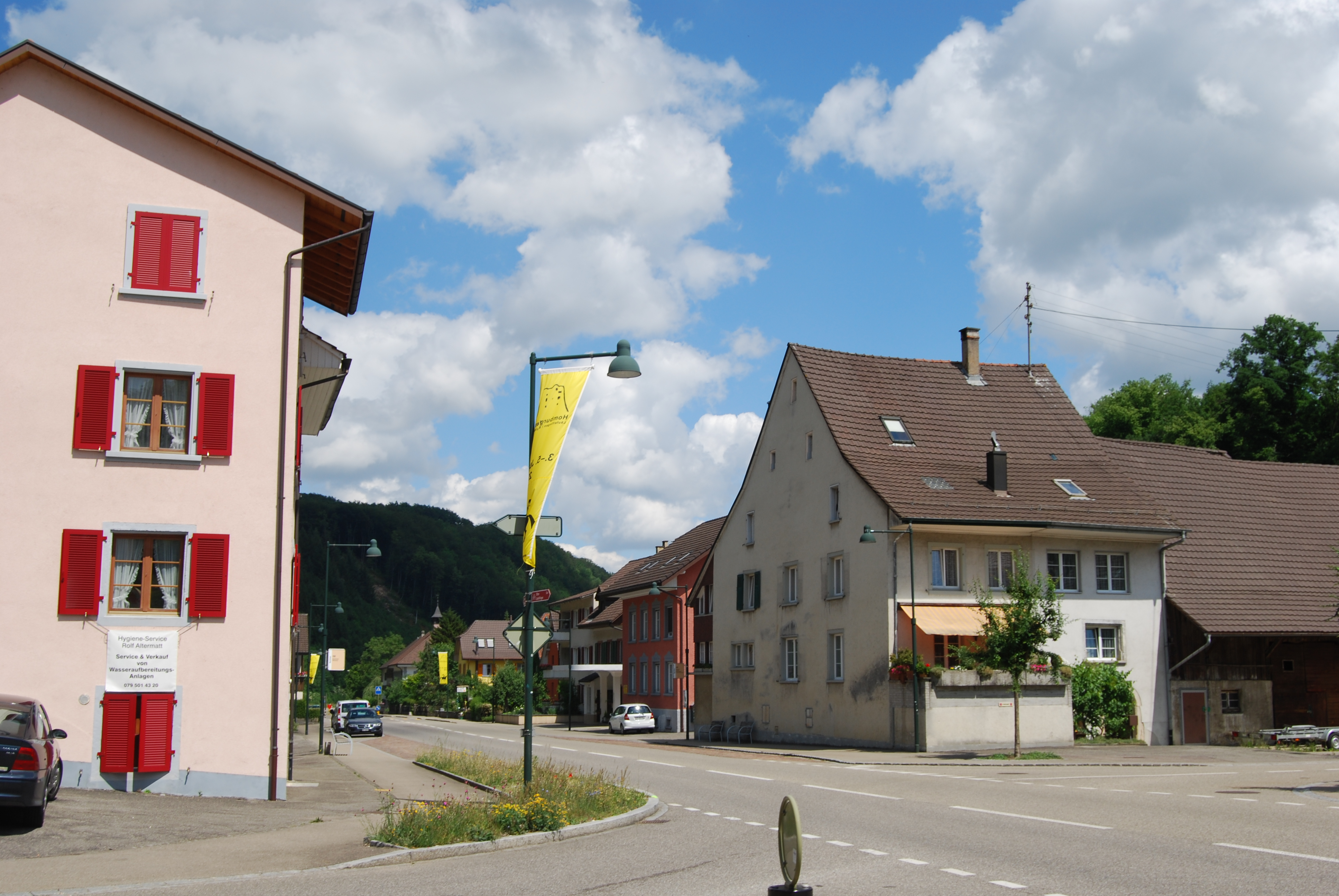
Buckten

== History ==
Buckten is first mentioned in 1266 as Butuchon.

== Geography ==
Aerial view from 3000 m by Walter Mittelholzer (1922)

Buckten has an area, as of 2009, of 1.99 square kilometers (0.77 sq mi). Of this area, 0.99 km^{2} (0.38 sq mi) or 49.7% is used for agricultural purposes, while 0.65 km^{2} (0.25 sq mi) or 32.7% is forested. Of the rest of the land, 0.34 km^{2} (0.13 sq mi) or 17.1% is settled (buildings or roads), 0.02 km^{2} (4.9 acres) or 1.0% is either rivers or lakes.

Of the built up area, industrial buildings made up 1.5% of the total area while housing and buildings made up 9.5% and transportation infrastructure made up 4.5%. Out of the forested land, 31.2% of the total land area is heavily forested and 1.5% is covered with orchards or small clusters of trees. Of the agricultural land, 28.1% is used for growing crops and 18.6% is pastures, while 3.0% is used for orchards or vine crops. All the water in the municipality is flowing water.

The municipality is located in the Sissach district, in the upper Homburger on the road to pass over the Unteren Hauenstein.

== Coat of arms ==
The blazon of the municipal coat of arms is Per fess, Sable a Posthorn Or, and Or, a Wheel Sable.

== Demographics ==
Buckten has a population (as of June 2021) of 708. As of 2008, 11.4% of the population are resident foreign nationals. Over the last 10 years (1997–2007) the population has changed at a rate of 0.6%.

Most of the population (as of 2000) speaks German (592 or 91.9%), with Italian language being second most common (12 or 1.9%) and Albanian being third (11 or 1.7%). There are 3 people who speak French and people who speak Romansh.

As of 2008, the gender distribution of the population was 51.6% male and 48.4% female. The population was made up of 606 Swiss citizens (86.8% of the population), and 92 non-Swiss residents (13.2%) Of the population in the municipality 201 or about 31.2% were born in Buckten and lived there in 2000. There were 196 or 30.4% who were born in the same canton, while 164 or 25.5% were born somewhere else in Switzerland, and 81 or 12.6% were born outside of Switzerland.

In 2008 there were five live births to Swiss citizens and two births to non-Swiss citizens, and in same time span there were three deaths of Swiss citizens. Ignoring immigration and emigration, the population of Swiss citizens increased by two while the foreign population increased by two. There was one Swiss woman who emigrated from Switzerland. At the same time, there was one non-Swiss man and six non-Swiss women who immigrated from another country to Switzerland. The total Swiss population change in 2008 (from all sources, including moves across municipal borders) was a decrease of seven and the non-Swiss population increased by five people. This represents a population growth rate of -0.3%.

The age distribution, as of 2010, in Buckten is; 51 children or 7.3% of the population are between 0 and 6 years old and 101 teenagers or 14.5% are between 7 and 19. Of the adult population, 78 people or 11.2% of the population are between 20 and 29 years old. 72 people or 10.3% are between 30 and 39, 112 people or 16.0% are between 40 and 49, and 160 people or 22.9% are between 50 and 64. The senior population distribution is 92 people or 13.2% of the population are between 65 and 79 years old and there are 32 people or 4.6% who are over 80.

As of 2000, there were 250 people who were single and never married in the municipality. There were 335 married individuals, 27 widows or widowers and 32 individuals who are divorced.

As of 2000, there were 268 private households in the municipality, and an average of 2.4 persons per household. There were 79 households that consist of only one person and 18 households with five or more people. Out of a total of 271 households that answered this question, 29.2% were households made up of just one person and 1 were adults who lived with their parents. Of the rest of the households, there are 89 married couples without children, 83 married couples with children There were 13 single parents with a child or children. There were 3 households that were made up unrelated people and 3 households that were made some sort of institution or another collective housing.

In 2000 there were 139 single family homes (or 69.5% of the total) out of a total of 200 inhabited buildings. There were 38 multi-family buildings (19.0%), along with 21 multi-purpose buildings that were mostly used for housing (10.5%) and 2 other use buildings (commercial or industrial) that also had some housing (1.0%). Of the single family homes 23 were built before 1919, while 18 were built between 1990 and 2000. The greatest number of single family homes (35) were built between 1981 and 1990.

In 2000 there were 283 apartments in the municipality. The most common apartment size was 4 rooms of which there were 86. There were 6 single room apartments and 129 apartments with five or more rooms. Of these apartments, a total of 265 apartments (93.6% of the total) were permanently occupied, while six apartments (2.1%) were seasonally occupied and twelve apartments (4.2%) were empty. As of 2007, the construction rate of new housing units was 0 new units per 1000 residents. As of 2000 the average price to rent a two-room apartment was about 716.00 CHF (US$570, £320, €460), a three-room apartment was about 743.00 CHF (US$590, £330, €480) and a four-room apartment cost an average of 993.00 CHF (US$790, £450, €640). The vacancy rate for the municipality, in 2008, was 0.68%.

The historical population is given in the following chart:

== Politics ==
In the 2007 federal election the most popular party was the SVP which received 38.35% of the vote. The next three most popular parties were the SP (24.11%), the Green Party (16.8%) and the FDP (9.92%). In the federal election, a total of 269 votes were cast, and the voter turnout was 51.7%.

== Economy ==
As of 2007, Buckten had an unemployment rate of 2.08%. As of 2005, there were 20 people employed in the primary economic sector and about seven businesses involved in this sector. 27 people were employed in the secondary sector and there were six businesses in this sector. 81 people were employed in the tertiary sector, with 21 businesses in this sector. There were 347 residents of the municipality who were employed in some capacity, of which females made up 39.8% of the workforce.

In 2008 the total number of full-time equivalent jobs was 92. The number of jobs in the primary sector was eleven, all of which were in agriculture. The number of jobs in the secondary sector was thirteen, of which 7.7% were in manufacturing and 92.3% were in construction. The number of jobs in the tertiary sector was 68. In the tertiary sector; 60.3% were in wholesale or retail sales or the repair of motor vehicles, 1.5% were in a hotel or restaurant, 2.9% were in the information industry, 1.5% were the insurance or financial industry, 2.9% were technical professionals or scientists, 4.4% were in education and 13.2% were in health care.

In 2000, there were 66 workers who commuted into the municipality and 272 workers who commuted away. The municipality is a net exporter of workers, with about 4.1 workers leaving the municipality for every one entering. Of the working population, 17.3% used public transportation to get to work, and 59.4% used a private car.

== Religion ==
From the 2000 census, 14.3% were Roman Catholic, while 65.4% belonged to the Swiss Reformed Church. Of the rest of the population, there was one individual who belongs to the Christian Catholic Church, and there were 14 individuals (or about 2.17% of the population) who belonged to another Christian church. There were 35 (or about 5.43% of the population) who were Islamic. 80 (or about 12.42% of the population) belonged to no church, are agnostic or atheist, and 1 individuals (or about 0.16% of the population) did not answer the question.

== Transport ==
Buckten sits on the Hauenstein line and is served by trains at Buckten railway station.

== Education ==
In Buckten about 42.9% of the population have completed non-mandatory upper secondary education, and 12.9% have completed additional higher education (either university or a Fachhochschule). Of the 83 who completed tertiary schooling, 68.7% were Swiss men, 22.9% were Swiss women.

As of 2000, there were 54 students from Buckten who attended schools outside the municipality.
