= Revue Thommen =

Swiss watch and aircraft equipment supplier

Revue Thommen logo

Revue Thommen is a timepiece company founded in Switzerland which produces luxury wristwatches and aircraft equipment.

== History ==
In 1853 Société d' Horlogerie à Waldenbourg was founded as a Swiss watch manufacturing company by the community of Waldenburg, Switzerland (Basel-Landschaft). It began to manufacture pocket watches in order to create work in the Waldenburg valley whose location at the route Basel-Geneva had become insignificant due to the newly established train connection Basel - Olten - Geneva.

In 1859 Gédéon Thommen and Louis Tschopp acquired the company and privately restructured it. Gédéon Thommen was also the founder and promoter of the Waldenburgerbahn, a steam train connecting the valley's villages. Tschopp left the company, which was renamed Gédéon Thommen's Uhrenfabriken.

From 1905, the company was commercially registered as Revue Thommen AG, a joint-stock company. Revue had been used earlier as a brand name of the company's wrist watches, after they had been marketed as "GT" watches (GT standing for Gédéon Thommen) before.

In 1916, the first aircraft chronograph for the Swiss Air Force was created and laid the foundation for the company's success as an aircraft instrument supplier.

From 1936 – 1943, the company produced cockpit instrumentation for the Swiss Air Force. Revue Thommen developed and supplied altimeters, airspeed indicators, vertical speed indicators, clocks, and the landing gear for the Swiss multifunction biplane EKW C-35.

From 1939 - 1944, commissioned by the German government, the company produced watches for the Wehrmacht, Luftwaffe, and Kriegsmarine under the brand Revue-Sport.

In 1945 Revue Thommen commercialized its technical capabilities in the aviation sector by launching a pocket altimeter for alpinists. Derivations like altimeters for parachutists followed, and were produced well into the Internet age.

In 1941, Thommen was manufacturing and casing watches for Vertex for the British market using Revue movements, with watches subsequently sold under both the Vertex and Vertex Revue names.

=== Recent history ===
In 2000 Revue Thommen AG granted a license to the Swiss company Grovana Ltd. for the manufacturing and marketing of the Revue Thommen wristwatch brand products, so Revue Thommen AG could focus on its aircraft instrument business.

After the wristwatch business was spun off, the company began expanding its mechanical cockpit instrument business through the introduction of electronic aircraft equipment, including air data systems and helicopter searchlights.

In 2012 "GT Thommen Watch AG", the joint-venture partnership of Andreas Thommen, Roland Buser and Christopher Bitterli, bought the intellectual property rights for the watch business from Revue Thommen AG and began revitalizing the brand in the Swiss wristwatch business. They appointed Swiss Initiative Limited (SIL) as sole license holder for production and worldwide distribution in 2015.

Now being solely an aviation industry supplier, Revue Thommen was acquired by Transas Group in 2012, a Russian technology company, which handed over its shares to the Russian private investor Sistema on October 4, 2015.

The decline of demand for mechanical aircraft instruments in the aviation industry and economical pressure also led Revue Thommen AG to restructure.

Revue, the former brand name of wrist watches, was removed from the company name in order to clearly identify the company as supplier to the aviation industry. In 2015 it was rebranded as Thommen Aircraft Equipment AG, and it sold its mechanical aircraft instrument business to Sathom, a subsidiary of the French aircraft component MRO company Satori Sarl, in June 2016.

Sathom stays at the original location of Revue Thommen and was granted a license to continue the production and sale of mechanical aircraft instruments under the Thommen brand name.

In 2016, Thommen Aircraft Equipment moved from Waldenburg to a modern location in Muttenz, Switzerland, closer to Basel, where it focuses on development of electronic aircraft clocks, air data systems and helicopter searchlights, and cabin emergency flashlights.
