= Sommerau railway station =

Railway station in Gelterkinden, Switzerland

Sommerau
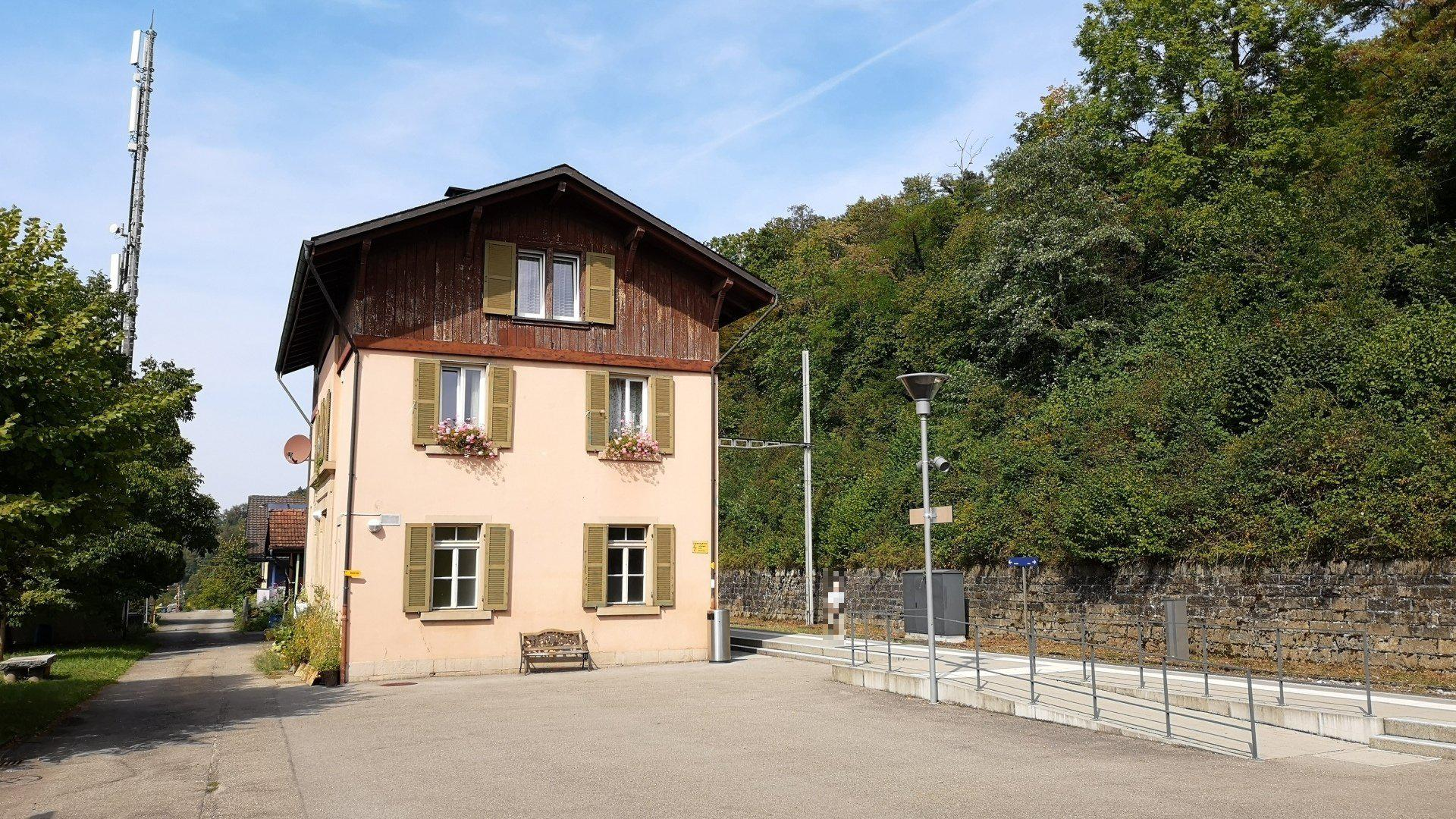
- The station in 2018

General information
- Location: Gelterkinden; Switzerland
- Coordinates: 47°26′20.58″N 7°51′6.05″E
- Owner: Swiss Federal Railways
- Line: Hauenstein line
- Train operators: Swiss Federal Railways

Services
Preceding station	Basel S-Bahn	Following station
Diepflingen towards Sissach	S9	Rümlingen towards Olten
Location
- Location within Switzerland

Sommerau railway station (German: Bahnhof Sommerau) is a railway station in the municipality of Gelterkinden, in the Swiss canton of Basel-Landschaft. It is an intermediate stop on the summit branch of the Hauenstein line and is served by local trains only.

== Services ==
The following services stop at Sommerau:

- Basel S-Bahn S9: hourly service between Sissach and Olten.
