= Deku =

Deku may refer to:

- Deku (The Legend of Zelda), a fictional race of wooden plant-like creatures
- Izuku Midoriya (nicknamed "Deku"), main character of the anime and manga series My Hero Academia
- Deku, a character from the manga Blood Lad
- Deku, a character from the video game Fighters Megamix
- Deku, a mecha from the anime Dai-Shogun - Great Revolution
- Deku, a character from the Telugu film Mama Alludu

== People with the surname ==
- Anthony Deku (1923–2015), Ghanaian politician
- Erich Deku, former owner of Bischofstein Castle
- Maria Deku (1901–1983), German politician

== See also ==
- Decoud, surname
- Decus (disambiguation)
