= Bischofstein =

Bischofstein may refer to:

- Bischofstein, the German name of Bisztynek, Poland
- Bischofstein Castle (Germany), a castle on the Moselle river in Germany
- Bischofstein Castle (Switzerland), a castle in the Swiss canton of Basel-Land
