= Bischofstein Castle =

Bischofstein Castle (German: Burg Bischofstein) may refer to:

- Bischofstein Castle (Germany), a castle on the Moselle river in Germany
- Bischofstein Castle (Switzerland), a castle in the Swiss canton of Basel-Land
