= Böckten =

- Municipality
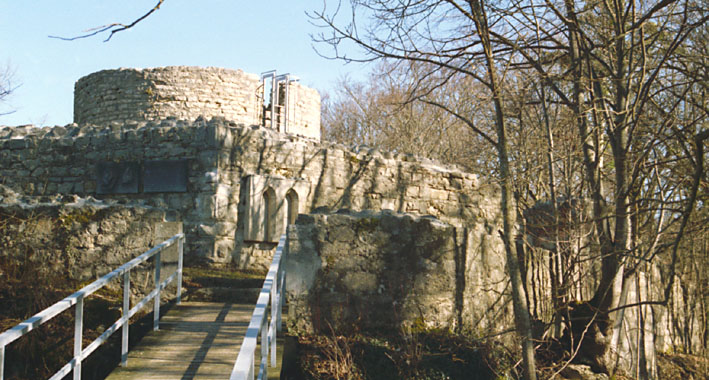

- Coat of arms
- Location of Böckten
- Location within Switzerland Location within Canton of Basel-Landschaft
- Coordinates: 47°28′N 7°50′E
- Country: Switzerland
- Canton: Basel-Landschaft
- District: Sissach

Area
  - Total: 2.28 km^{2} (0.88 sq mi)
- Elevation: 385 m (1,263 ft)

Population (June 2021)
  - Total: 812
  - Density: 356/km^{2} (922/sq mi)
- Time zone: UTC+01:00 (CET)
  - Summer (DST): UTC+02:00 (CEST)
- Postal code: 4461
- SFOS number: 2842
- ISO 3166 code: CH-BL
- Surrounded by: Gelterkinden, Rickenbach, Sissach, Thürnen
- Website: boeckten.ch

Böckten is a municipality in the district of Sissach in the canton of Basel-Country in Switzerland.

== Geography ==
Aerial view by Walter Mittelholzer (1922)

Böckten has an area, as of 2009, of 2.28 square kilometers (0.88 sq mi). Of this area, 0.98 km^{2} (0.38 sq mi) or 43.0% is used for agricultural purposes, while 0.95 km^{2} (0.37 sq mi) or 41.7% is forested. Of the rest of the land, 0.33 km^{2} (0.13 sq mi) or 14.5% is settled (buildings or roads), 0.03 km^{2} (7.4 acres) or 1.3% is either rivers or lakes.

Of the built up area, industrial buildings made up 1.8% of the total area while housing and buildings made up 6.6% and transportation infrastructure made up 5.3%. Out of the forested land, 39.9% of the total land area is heavily forested and 1.8% is covered with orchards or small clusters of trees. Of the agricultural land, 20.6% is used for growing crops and 18.9% is pastures, while 3.5% is used for orchards or vine crops. All the water in the municipality is flowing water.

Böckten is situated in the Ergolz valley. This valley is named after Basel-Country's main river, the Ergolz, which flows into the Rhine before Basel and was already a drinking water source for the Romans. In this valley, Böckten lies between its two main neighbouring municipalities Sissach (located westward, towards Liestal and Basel) and Gelterkinden (located eastward, towards Olten).

Böckten's remaining two neighbouring municipalities – apart from the before mentioned Sissach and Gelterkinden – are the smaller Thürnen and Rickenbach, which lead into separate smaller valleys. The latter is the first municipality of the Homburg valley, which leads towards the Hauenstein hills.

Böckten's center lies 385 meters above sea level. However, its hills (in the forests) reach up to 740 meters.

== General information ==
While Böckten has grown together with Gelterkinden during the 1980s and 1990s, it remains separate from Sissach to this day. Nevertheless, it is mainly attached to Sissach in administrative matters (e.g. school system, church). Its location between these bigger municipalities, that both possess an express train railway station, makes Böckten much more connected to the nearby centers (most notably Basel and Liestal) than most other localities of comparable size.

Unlike in neighbouring Sissach and Gelterkinden, there are no church bells in Böckten to wake you at 6am.

== History ==
Böckten was first mentioned as Bettinghofen, which became simplified to Bettinchon (first mentioned in 1246), which in turn changed to Betkon (first mentioned in 1339). In the Middle Ages Böckten belonged to the earl of Homburg. Its governance changed several times until it came to Basel in 1467. After the establishing of the Gotthard Pass, the Bischofstein castle was built and completed in 1311 in order to secure the region. It was destroyed due to the 1356 Basel earthquake, which affected the whole region. It has since then been restored.

Not unlike many Swiss agglomerations, Böckten has witnessed a building boom from the 1980s onwards, which quickly doubled its population from below 400 in 1980 to over 700 in 1991.

== Demographics ==
Böckten has a population (as of June 2021) of 812. As of 2008, 7.3% of the population are resident foreign nationals. Over the last 10 years (1997–2007) the population has changed at a rate of 12.1%.

Most of the population (as of 2000) speaks German (605 or 90.4%), with Albanian being second most common (13 or 1.9%) and Italian language being third (12 or 1.8%). There are 8 people who speak French and 1 person who speaks Romansh.

As of 2008, the gender distribution of the population was 50.3% male and 49.7% female. The population was made up of 715 Swiss citizens (91.7% of the population), and 65 non-Swiss residents (8.3%) Of the population in the municipality 199 or about 29.7% were born in Böckten and lived there in 2000. There were 226 or 33.8% who were born in the same canton, while 159 or 23.8% were born somewhere else in Switzerland, and 72 or 10.8% were born outside of Switzerland.

In 2008 there were 10 live births to Swiss citizens and were 5 deaths of Swiss citizens. Ignoring immigration and emigration, the population of Swiss citizens increased by 5 while the foreign population remained the same. There was 1 Swiss man who emigrated from Switzerland. At the same time, there was 1 non-Swiss man who immigrated from another country to Switzerland. The total Swiss population change in 2008 (from all sources, including moves across municipal borders) was an increase of 14 and the non-Swiss population decreased by 2 people. This represents a population growth rate of 1.6%.

The age distribution, as of 2010, in Böckten is; 64 children or 8.2% of the population are between 0 and 6 years old and 92 teenagers or 11.8% are between 7 and 19. Of the adult population, 88 people or 11.3% of the population are between 20 and 29 years old. 129 people or 16.5% are between 30 and 39, 118 people or 15.1% are between 40 and 49, and 171 people or 21.9% are between 50 and 64. The senior population distribution is 82 people or 10.5% of the population are between 65 and 79 years old and there are 36 people or 4.6% who are over 80.

As of 2000, there were 253 people who were single and never married in the municipality. There were 353 married individuals, 35 widows or widowers and 28 individuals who are divorced.

As of 2000, there were 270 private households in the municipality, and an average of 2.4 persons per household. There were 68 households that consist of only one person and 16 households with five or more people. Out of a total of 277 households that answered this question, 24.5% were households made up of just one person and 1 were adults who lived with their parents. Of the rest of the households, there are 95 married couples without children, 94 married couples with children There were 8 single parents with a child or children. There were 4 households that were made up unrelated people and 7 households that were made some sort of institution or another collective housing.

In 2000 there were 133 single family homes (or 68.2% of the total) out of a total of 195 inhabited buildings. There were 33 multi-family buildings (16.9%), along with 20 multi-purpose buildings that were mostly used for housing (10.3%) and 9 other use buildings (commercial or industrial) that also had some housing (4.6%). Of the single family homes 20 were built before 1919, while 23 were built between 1990 and 2000. The greatest number of single family homes (36) were built between 1971 and 1980.

In 2000 there were 292 apartments in the municipality. The most common apartment size was 4 rooms of which there were 96. There were 11 single room apartments and 97 apartments with five or more rooms. Of these apartments, a total of 267 apartments (91.4% of the total) were permanently occupied, while 13 apartments (4.5%) were seasonally occupied and 12 apartments (4.1%) were empty. As of 2007, the construction rate of new housing units was 2.6 new units per 1000 residents. As of 2000 the average price to rent a two-room apartment was about 761.00 CHF (US$610, £340, €490), a three-room apartment was about 1001.00 CHF (US$800, £450, €640) and a four-room apartment cost an average of 1409.00 CHF (US$1130, £630, €900). The vacancy rate for the municipality, in 2008, was 0%.

The historical population is given in the following chart:

== Economy ==
Besides several typical small-scale enterprises, Böckten is the site of a factory of the Swiss comestible goods chain Le Patron.

As of 2007, Böckten had an unemployment rate of 2.17%. As of 2005, there were 17 people employed in the primary economic sector and about 7 businesses involved in this sector. 334 people were employed in the secondary sector and there were 13 businesses in this sector. 62 people were employed in the tertiary sector, with 16 businesses in this sector. There were 352 residents of the municipality who were employed in some capacity, of which females made up 40.9% of the workforce.

In 2008 the total number of full-time equivalent jobs was 383. The number of jobs in the primary sector was 9, all of which were in agriculture. The number of jobs in the secondary sector was 333, of which 308 or (92.5%) were in manufacturing and 25 (7.5%) were in construction. The number of jobs in the tertiary sector was 41. In the tertiary sector; 12 or 29.3% were in wholesale or retail sales or the repair of motor vehicles, 5 or 12.2% were in a hotel or restaurant, 3 or 7.3% were in the information industry, 2 or 4.9% were the insurance or financial industry, 3 or 7.3% were technical professionals or scientists, 4 or 9.8% were in education and 1 or 2.4% were in health care.

In 2000, there were 321 workers who commuted into the municipality and 279 workers who commuted away. The municipality is a net importer of workers, with about 1.2 workers entering the municipality for every one leaving. About 5.0% of the workforce coming into Böckten are coming from outside Switzerland. Of the working population, 20.5% used public transportation to get to work, and 46.9% used a private car.

== Transportation ==
Böckten is the midpoint on the 105 bus route between Sissach train station and Gelterkinden centre which are each only a few minutes away. Both Sissach and Gelterkinden have regular trains to Basel (17 mins) and to Zurich, Bern and Luzern via Olten. Gelterkinden's station lies near its border with Böckten and is easily reachable on foot. Sissach's express railway station can be easily reached by bike.

The Swiss automobile highway system can be joined in Sissach in an approximate distance of four kilometers.

From 1891 on, Böckten harbored a station of the electronic tramway that commuted between Sissach and Gelterkinden. This railway line became obsolete and inactive with the installment of the federal railway line Basel-Olten on 8 January 1916.

== Religion ==
From the 2000 census, 113 or 16.9% were Roman Catholic, while 389 or 58.1% belonged to the Swiss Reformed Church. Of the rest of the population, there were 2 members of an Orthodox church (or about 0.30% of the population), there were 6 individuals (or about 0.90% of the population) who belonged to the Christian Catholic Church, and there were 21 individuals (or about 3.14% of the population) who belonged to another Christian church. There were 33 (or about 4.93% of the population) who were Islamic. 89 (or about 13.30% of the population) belonged to no church, are agnostic or atheist, and 15 individuals (or about 2.24% of the population) did not answer the question.

== Education ==
Böckten has its own primary school (5 school years, from age 7 on) and kindergarten (2 school years, from age 5 on). From secondary school level on (4 school years, from age 12 on), students have to commute to Sissach (by bicycle or bus). For facultative higher school education (as grammar school), students have to commute to Liestal (by train). The closest university is the one in Basel.

In Böckten about 279 or (41.7%) of the population have completed non-mandatory upper secondary education, and 80 or (12.0%) have completed additional higher education (either university or a Fachhochschule). Of the 80 who completed tertiary schooling, 75.0% were Swiss men, 17.5% were Swiss women.

As of 2000, there were 55 students from Böckten who attended schools outside the municipality.

== Social life ==
Typical for Swiss localities, Böckten has several clubs. The most notable of them are the different sport clubs for men, women, boys and girls. Besides that there are clubs for carnival, culture (in general), fishing, shooting, tennis, and viniculture, as well as a women's club.

== Politics ==
In the 2019 federal election the most popular party was the SVP which received 30.0% of the vote. The next three most popular parties were the SP (19.4%), the Green Party (18.1%) and the FDP (15.4%). In the federal election, a total of 286 votes were cast, and the voter turnout was 49.0%.

The municipal council consists of five members. They get elected by the local residents on a periodical basis. Each of them is responsible for a different department. Its current members (as of January 2007) as well as their respective departments are as follows:

- Mr Ulrich Altaus (municipal president):

Architecture, police, economics (agriculture and forestry), hunting, fishery

- Mr Peter Fiechter (vice president):

Sewage, water supply, municipally owned real estate

- Mrs Trudy Bruttel:

Education, culture (kindergarten, schools, youth music school, churches, cultural promotion, recreational time, sports), social security, health care, social welfare

- Mr Ralph Thurnherr:

Land use planning and regulation, road administration, public transportation, environmental protection, cemetery, public security (military, fire department, civil defense)

- Mr Elmar Gürtler:

Finances, accounting, taxing, insurances, general administration

== Places of interest ==
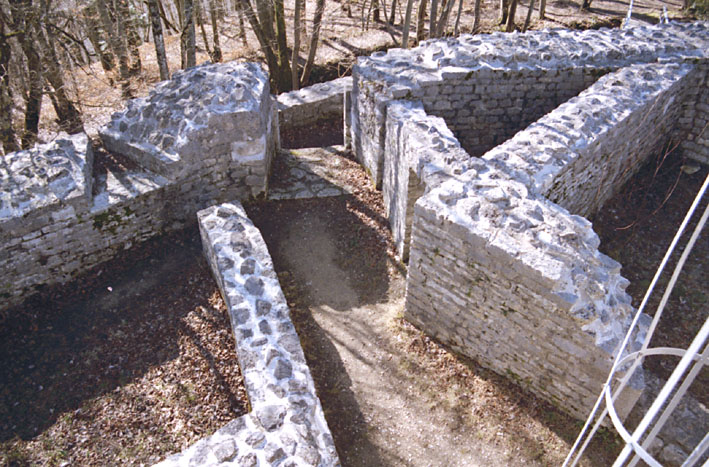
Ruins of Bischofstein

- Bischofstein ruin, located at approximately 740 meters (2,430 ft) above sea level, with view towards Sissach
- Lookout point with fireplace in the forest with view towards Böckten

== Coat of arms ==
The blazon of the municipal coat of arms is Barry of Six Argent and Azure.

This is the emblem of the last nobility that possessed Böckten, the Truchsessen of Rheinfelden.
