= Rickenbach =

Rickenbach is the name of several places:

== Germany ==
- Rickenbach, Baden-Württemberg

== Switzerland ==
- Rickenbach, Basel-Landschaft
- Rickenbach, Lucerne
- Rickenbach, Schwyz
- Rickenbach, Solothurn
- Rickenbach, Thurgau
- Rickenbach, Zurich
