= Decus =

Decus is a Latin word meaning "ornament". It may refer to

- Decus et tutamen, "an ornament and a safeguard", motto on the one-pound sterling coin
- DECUS, the Digital Equipment Computer Users' Society

== See also ==
- Decussation
- Decs (disambiguation)
