= Sissach =

- Municipality
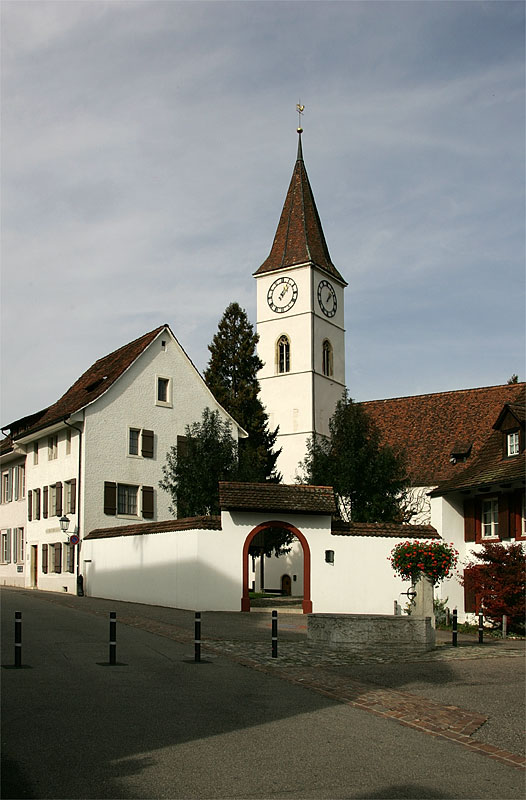

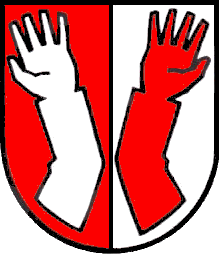
- Coat of arms
- Location of Sissach
- Location within Switzerland Location within Canton of Basel-Landschaft
- Coordinates: 47°28′N 7°49′E
- Country: Switzerland
- Canton: Basel-Landschaft
- District: Sissach

Area
  - Total: 8.87 km^{2} (3.42 sq mi)
- Elevation: 376 m (1,234 ft)

Population (June 2021)
  - Total: 6,771
  - Density: 763/km^{2} (1,980/sq mi)
- Time zone: UTC+01:00 (CET)
  - Summer (DST): UTC+02:00 (CEST)
- Postal code: 4450
- SFOS number: 2861
- ISO 3166 code: CH-BL
- Surrounded by: Böckten, Hersberg, Itingen, Lausen, Nusshof, Rickenbach, Thürnen, Wintersingen, Zunzgen
- Website: www.sissach.ch

Sissach (German pronunciation: [zɪsax]; Swiss German: Sissech, Alemannic German: [sɪsːəx]) is a municipality and the capital of the district of Sissach in the canton of Basel-Country, Switzerland.

== History ==
Sissach is first mentioned around 1225-26 as Sissaho.

== Geography ==
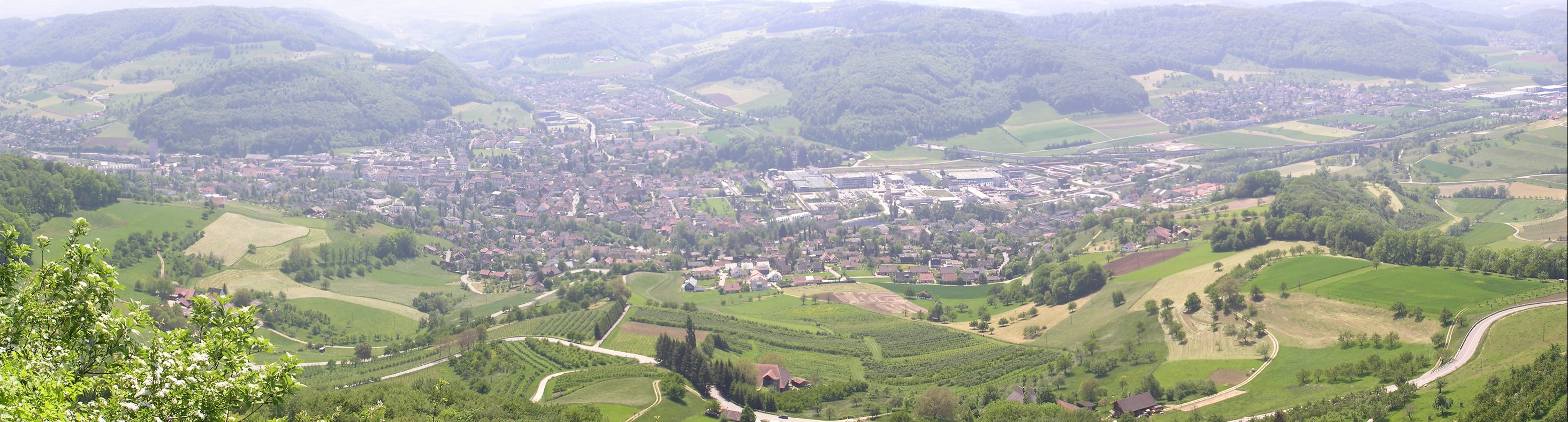
Sissach

Aerial view from 400 m by Walter Mittelholzer (1919)

Sissach has an area, of 8.87 square kilometers (3.42 sq mi). Of this area, 2.5 km^{2} (0.97 sq mi) (28.2%) is used for agricultural purposes, while 2.22 km^{2} (0.86 sq mi) (25.0%) is developed. Of the rest of the land, 4.13 km^{2} (1.59 sq mi) (46.6%) is forested, 0.02 km^{2} (0.0077 sq mi) (0.2%) is aqueous, and 0.01 km^{2} (0.0039 sq mi) (0.1%) is otherwise undeveloped.

Of the developed area, housing and buildings make up 12.4%, transportation infrastructure makes up 6.3%, and industrial buildings make up 2.8% . Power and water infrastructure as well as other special developed areas make up 1.6% of the area while parks, green belts and sports fields make up 1.9%. Out of the forested land, 45.1% of the total land area is heavily forested and 1.5% is covered with orchards or small clusters of trees. Of the agricultural land, 3.6% is used for growing crops and 16.9% is pastures, while 7.7% is used for orchards or vine crops.

The municipality is the capital of the district with the same name. Sissach village was originally a linear village along the Ergolz river. By the beginning of the 21st Century, it had expanded to fill the entire valley and part of the slopes around the valley. It grew along the road between the Schafmatt and Unterer Hauenstein Jura passes. It includes the settlements of Itchon (first mentioned in 1226), and Gruonach and Wilmatten (both mentioned in 1446).

== Coat of arms ==
The blazon of the municipal coat of arms is Per pale Gules and Argent, two Arms palewise counterchanged.

== Demographics ==
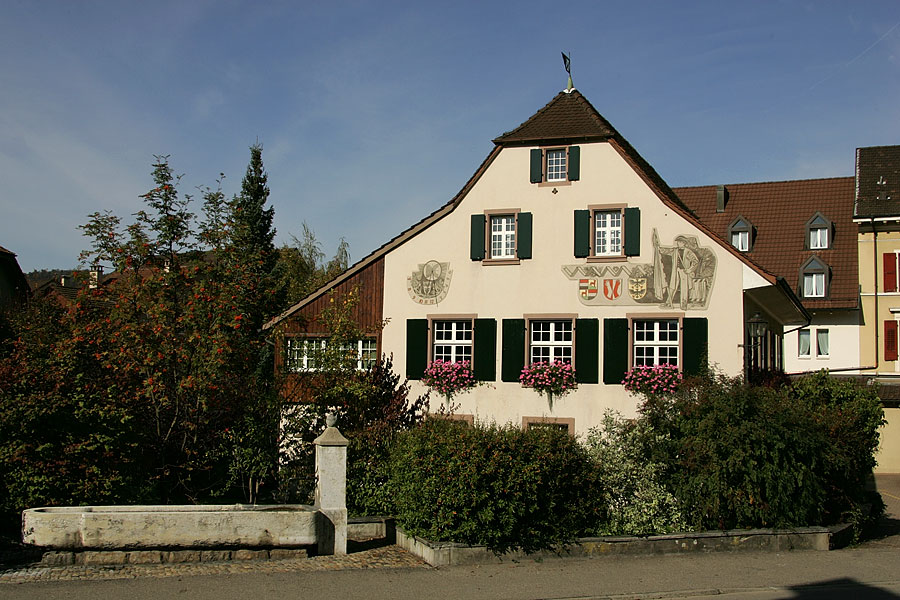
Sissach village history museum

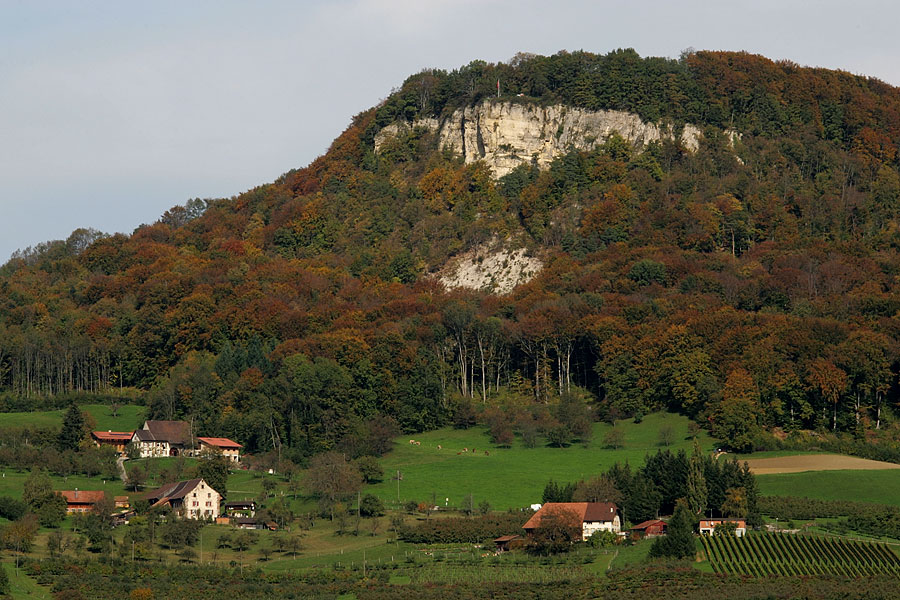
Sissacher Fluh near Sissach

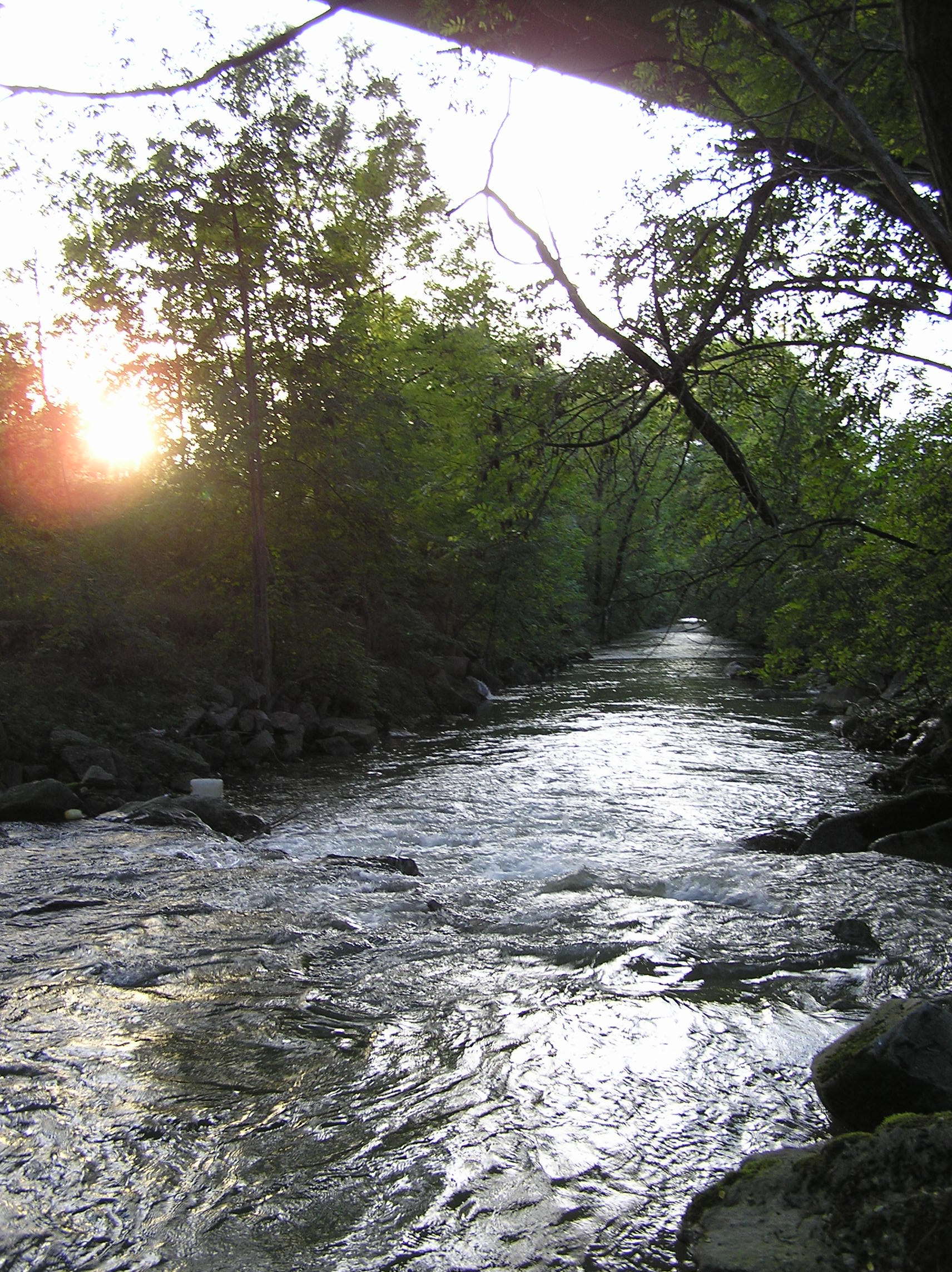
Ergolz river

Sissach has a population (as of June 2021) of 6,771. As of 2008, 17.0% of the population are resident foreign nationals. Over the last 10 years (1997–2007) the population has changed at a rate of 16%.

Most of the population (as of 2000) speaks German (4,723 or 88.7%), with Italian language being second most common (180 or 3.4%) and Portuguese being third (98 or 1.8%). There are 34 people who speak French and 5 people who speak Romansh.

As of 2008, the gender distribution of the population was 49.5% male and 50.5% female. The population was made up of 5113 Swiss citizens (82.7% of the population), and 1669 non-Swiss residents (17.3%) Of the population in the municipality 1489 or about 28.0% were born in Sissach and lived there in 2000. There were 1394 or 26.2% who were born in the same canton, while 1351 or 25.4% were born somewhere else in Switzerland, and 938 or 17.6% were born outside of Switzerland.

In 2008 there were 53 live births to Swiss citizens and 13 births to non-Swiss citizens. In same time span there were 47 deaths of Swiss citizens and 2 non-Swiss citizen deaths. The population of Swiss citizens increased by 6 while the foreign population increased by 11. There were 6 Swiss men and 8 Swiss women who immigrated into Sissach. At the same time, there were 39 non-Swiss men and 31 non-Swiss women who moved to Sissach from another country. The total Swiss population change in 2008 (from all sources, including moves across municipal borders) was an increase of 222 and the non-Swiss population increased by 65 people. This represents a population growth rate of 5.0%.

Sissach's age distribution as of 2010, is as follows. 444 children (7.2% of the population) are between 0 and 6 years old and 794 teenagers (2.8%) are between 7 and 19. Of the adult population, 935 people (15.1%) are between 20 and 29 years old. 919 people (14.9%) are between 30 and 39, 946 people (15.3%) are between 40 and 49, and 1,194 people (19.3%) are between 50 and 64. Of seniors, 660 people (10.7%) are between 65 and 79 years old and 290 people (4.7%) are over 80.

As of 2000, there were 2185 people who were single and never married in the municipality. There were 2,549 married individuals, 330 widows or widowers and 261 divorced individuals.

As of 2000, there were 2332 private households in the municipality, with an average of 2.2 persons within each. Out of a total of 2378 households that answered this question, 34.9% were made up of just one person. 829 households consisted of only one person, while 116 households consisted of five or more people. Of the rest of the households, 672 were married couples without children, and 660 were married couples with children. There were 119 single parents. There were 42 households that were made up unrelated people and 46 households that were made some sort of institution or another collective housing.

In 2000 there were 733 single-family homes (58.5% of the total) out of a total of 1252 inhabited buildings. There were 240 multi-family buildings (19.2%), along with 177 multi-purpose buildings that were mostly used for housing (14.1%) and 102 other use buildings (commercial or industrial) that also had some housing (8.1%). Of the single-family homes 66 were built before 1919, while 111 were built between 1990 and 2000. The greatest number of single-family homes (155) were built between 1946 and 1960.

In 2000 there were 2452 apartments in the municipality. The most common apartment size was 4 rooms of which there were 687. There were 100 single room apartments and 753 apartments with five or more rooms. Of these apartments, a total of 2,278 apartments (92.9% of the total) were permanently occupied, while 111 apartments (4.5%) were seasonally occupied and 63 apartments (2.6%) were empty. As of 2009, the construction rate of new housing units was 4.4 new units per 1000 residents. As of 2000 the average price to rent a two-room apartment was about 836.00 CHF (US$670, £380, €540), a three-room apartment was about 1069.00 CHF (US$860, £480, €680) and a four-room apartment cost an average of 1282.00 CHF (US$1030, £580, €820). The vacancy rate for the municipality, in 2010, was 0.55%.

The historical population is given in the following chart:

== Heritage sites of national significance ==
Bischofstein Castle and Sissacherfluh Castle (both prehistoric hilltop settlement and medieval castle), Ebenrain Castle, the prehistoric hilltop settlement of Burgenrain and the reformed parish Church of St Jakob are listed as Swiss heritage site of national significance. The entire town of Sissach is part of the Inventory of Swiss Heritage Sites.

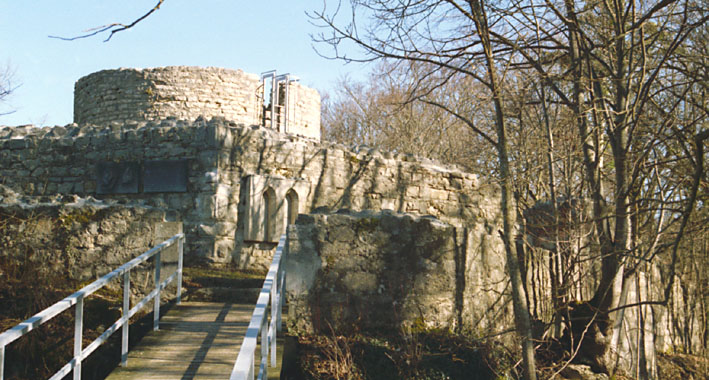
Bishofstein Castle

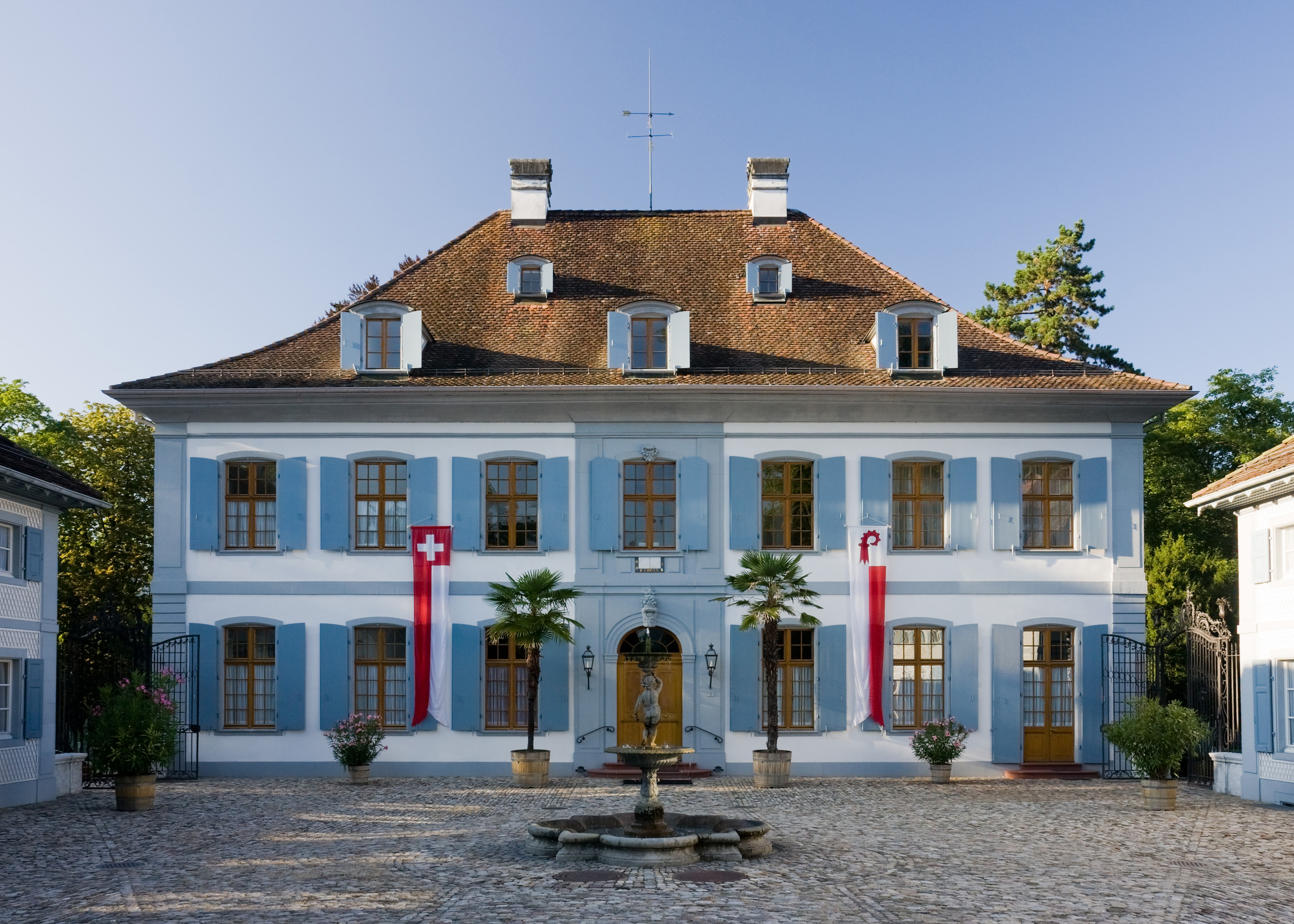
Ebenrain Castle

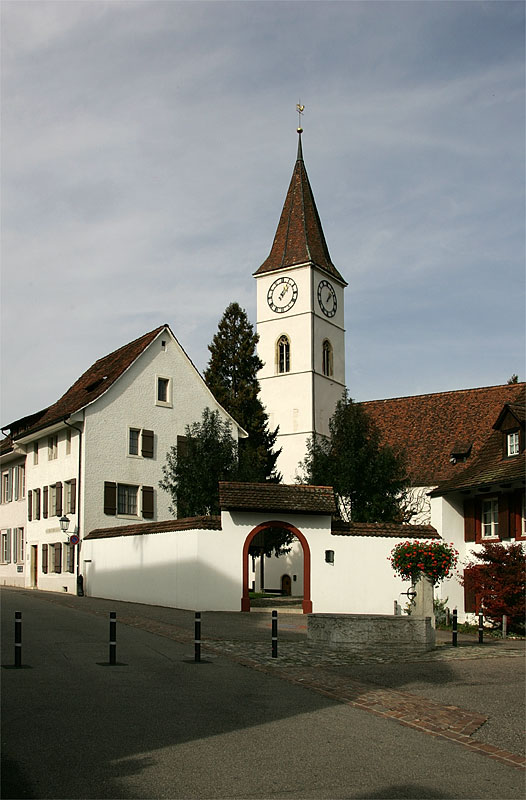
Reformed parish Church of St Jakob

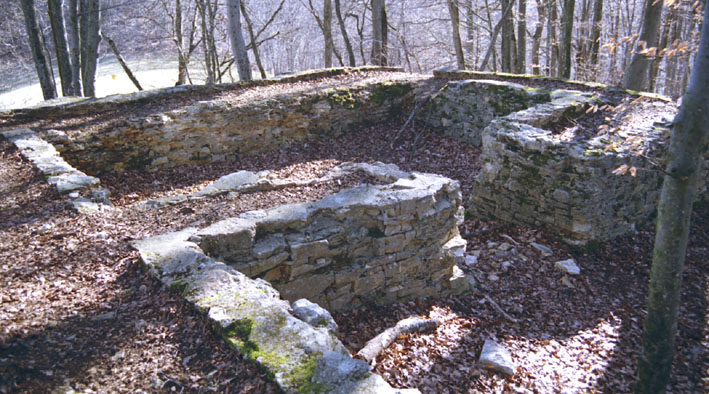
Sissacherfluh Castle

== Economy ==
As of 2010, Sissach had an unemployment rate of 2.8%. As of 2008, there were 117 people employed in the primary economic sector and about 23 businesses involved in this sector. 1510 people were employed in the secondary sector and there were 76 businesses in this sector. 2066 people were employed in the tertiary sector, with 310 businesses in this sector. There were 2902 residents of the municipality who were employed in some capacity, of which females made up 43.3% of the workforce.

In 2008 the total number of full-time equivalent jobs was 3117. The number of jobs in the primary sector was 60, of which 52 were in agriculture and 7 were in forestry or lumber production. The number of jobs in the secondary sector was 1431, of which 898 (62.8%) were in manufacturing, 2 (0.1%) were in mining and 516 (36.1%) were in construction. The number of jobs in the tertiary sector was 1626. In the tertiary sector, 526 (32.3%) were in wholesale or retail sales or the repair of motor vehicles, 53 (3.3%) were in the movement and storage of goods, 110 (6.8%) were in a hotel or restaurant, 45 (2.8%) were in the information industry, 68 (4.2%) were the insurance or financial industry, 146 (9.0%) were technical professionals or scientists, 210 (12.9%) were in education and 191 (1.7%) were in health care.

In 2000, there were 2666 workers who commuted into the municipality and 1,887 workers who commuted away. The municipality is a net importer of workers, with about 1.4 workers entering the municipality for every one leaving. About 5.0% of the workforce coming into Sissach are coming from outside Switzerland. Of the working population, 28.8% used public transportation to get to work, and 42.1% used a private car.

== Religion ==
From the 2000 census, 1270 or 23.8% were Roman Catholic, while 2,927 (55.0%) belonged to the Swiss Reformed Church. Of the rest of the population, there were 23 members of an Orthodox church (0.43%), 13 individuals (0.24%) who belonged to the Christian Catholic Church, and 138 individuals (or about 2.59%) who belonged to another Christian church. There were 5 individuals (0.09%) who were Jewish, and 227 (4.26%) who were Islamic. There were 10 individuals who were Buddhist, 19 individuals who were Hindu and 4 individuals who belonged to another church. 542 (10.18%) belonged to no church, are agnostic or atheist, and 147 individuals (2.76%) did not answer the question.

== Transport ==
Sissach sits on the Hauenstein line and is served by trains at Sissach railway station.

== Weather ==
Sissach has an average of 137.8 days of rain or snow per year and on average receives 1,027 mm (40.4 in) of precipitation. The wettest month is August during which time Sissach receives an average of 122 mm (4.8 in) of precipitation. During this month there is precipitation for an average of 12.7 days. The month with the most days of precipitation is May, with an average of 13.5, but with only 108 mm (4.3 in) of rain or snow. The driest month of the year is February with an average of 65 mm (2.6 in) of precipitation over 11.2 days.

== Education ==
In Sissach about 2,156 (40.5%) have completed non-mandatory upper secondary education, and 762 (14.3%) have completed additional higher education (either university or a Fachhochschule). Of the 762 who completed tertiary schooling, 68.9% were Swiss men, 20.1% were Swiss women, 7.1% were non-Swiss men and 3.9% were non-Swiss women.

As of 2000, there were 572 students in Sissach who came from another municipality, while 177 residents attended schools outside the municipality.

== Notable residents ==
- 1975 DJ Antoine (real name Antoine Konrad), Swiss DJ producer based in Basel
