= Rickenbach, Basel-Landschaft =

Rickenbach
- Municipality
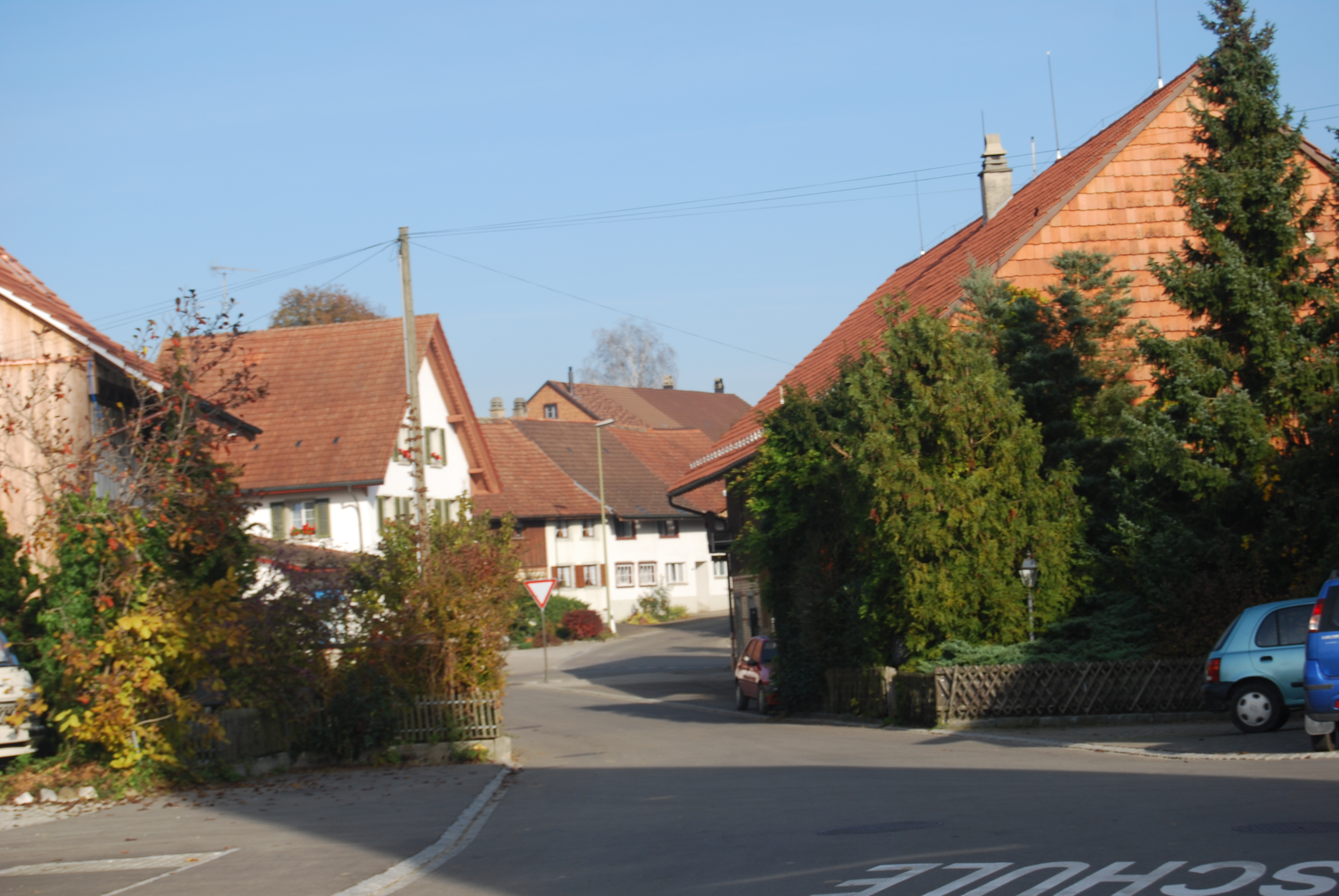

- Coat of arms
- Location of Rickenbach
- Location within Switzerland Location within Canton of Basel-Landschaft
- Coordinates: 47°29′N 7°51′E
- Country: Switzerland
- Canton: Basel-Landschaft
- District: Sissach

Area
  - Total: 2.89 km^{2} (1.12 sq mi)
- Elevation: 479 m (1,572 ft)

Population (June 2021)
  - Total: 612
  - Density: 212/km^{2} (548/sq mi)
- Time zone: UTC+01:00 (CET)
  - Summer (DST): UTC+02:00 (CEST)
- Postal code: 4462
- SFOS number: 2857
- ISO 3166 code: CH-BL
- Surrounded by: Böckten, Buus, Gelterkinden, Ormalingen, Sissach, Wintersingen
- Website: www.rickenbach-bl.ch

Rickenbach (Swiss Standard German pronunciation: [ˈrɪkn̩bax]) is a municipality in the district of Sissach in the canton of Basel-Country in Switzerland.

== History ==
Rickenbach is first mentioned in 1274 as Richenbah.

== Geography ==
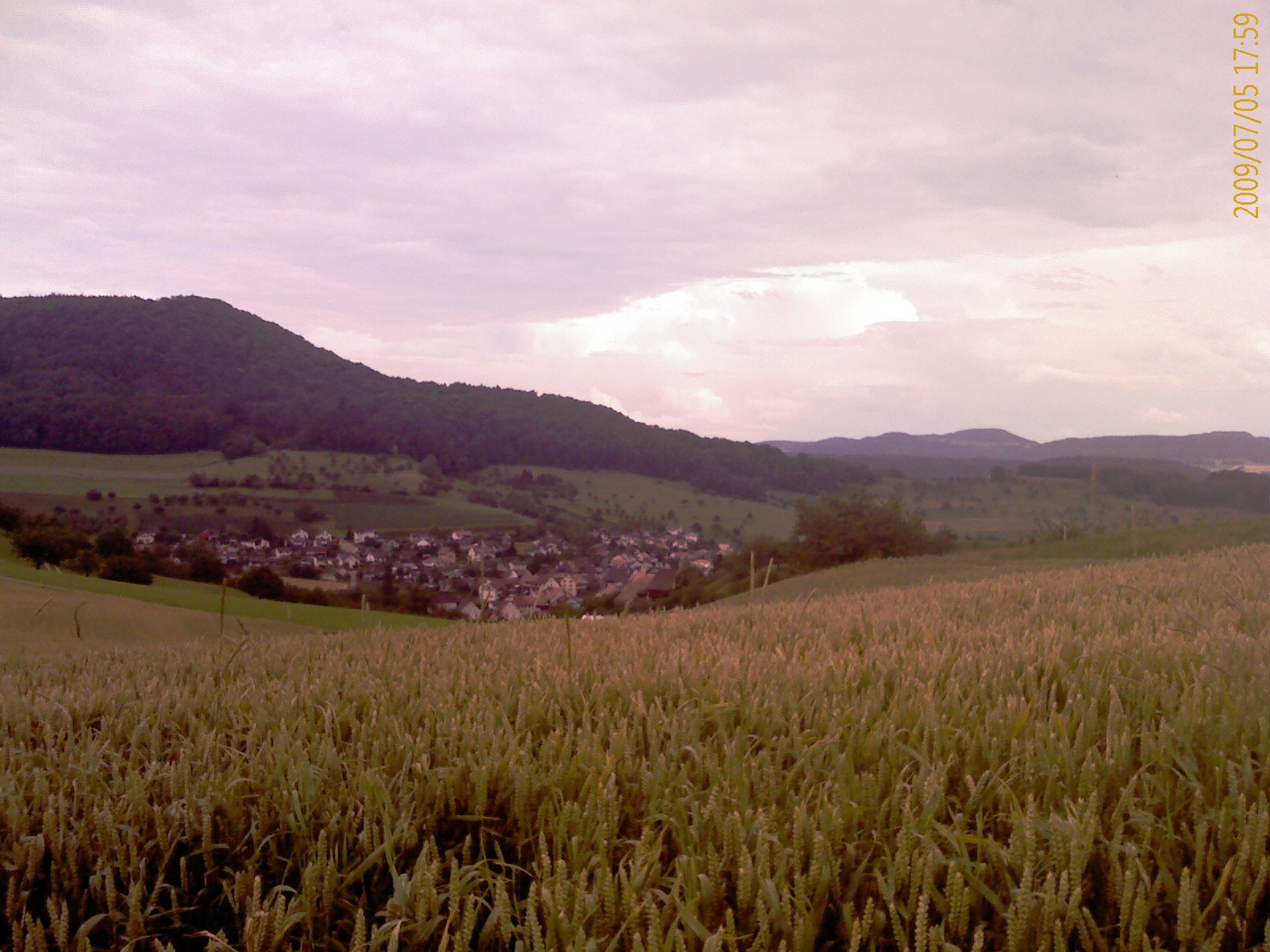
Rickenbach

Aerial view (1950)

Rickenbach has an area, as of 2009, of 2.89 square kilometers (1.12 sq mi). Of this area, 1.62 km^{2} (0.63 sq mi) or 56.1% is used for agricultural purposes, while 0.95 km^{2} (0.37 sq mi) or 32.9% is forested. Of the rest of the land, 0.31 km^{2} (0.12 sq mi) or 10.7% is settled (buildings or roads) and 0.01 km^{2} (2.5 acres) or 0.3% is unproductive land.

Of the built up area, housing and buildings made up 6.9% and transportation infrastructure made up 3.1%. Out of the forested land, 31.1% of the total land area is heavily forested and 1.7% is covered with orchards or small clusters of trees. Of the agricultural land, 8.7% is used for growing crops and 29.8% is pastures, while 17.6% is used for orchards or vine crops.

The municipality is located in the Sissach district, in a side valley off the Ergolz valley.

== Coat of arms ==
The blazon of the municipal coat of arms is Per fess Gules and Azure, overall a Bar wavy Argent.

== Demographics ==
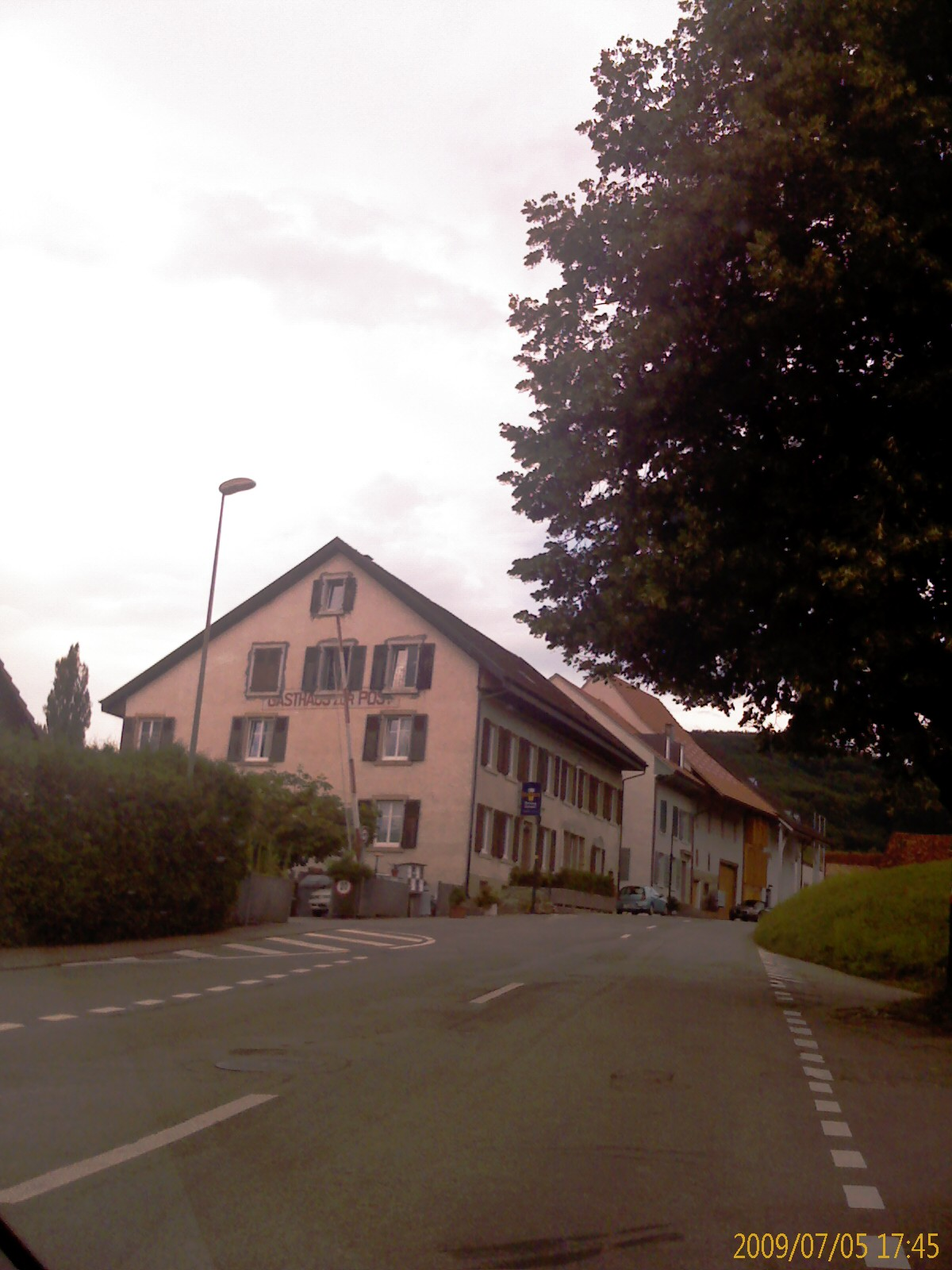
Hotel Post in Rickenbach

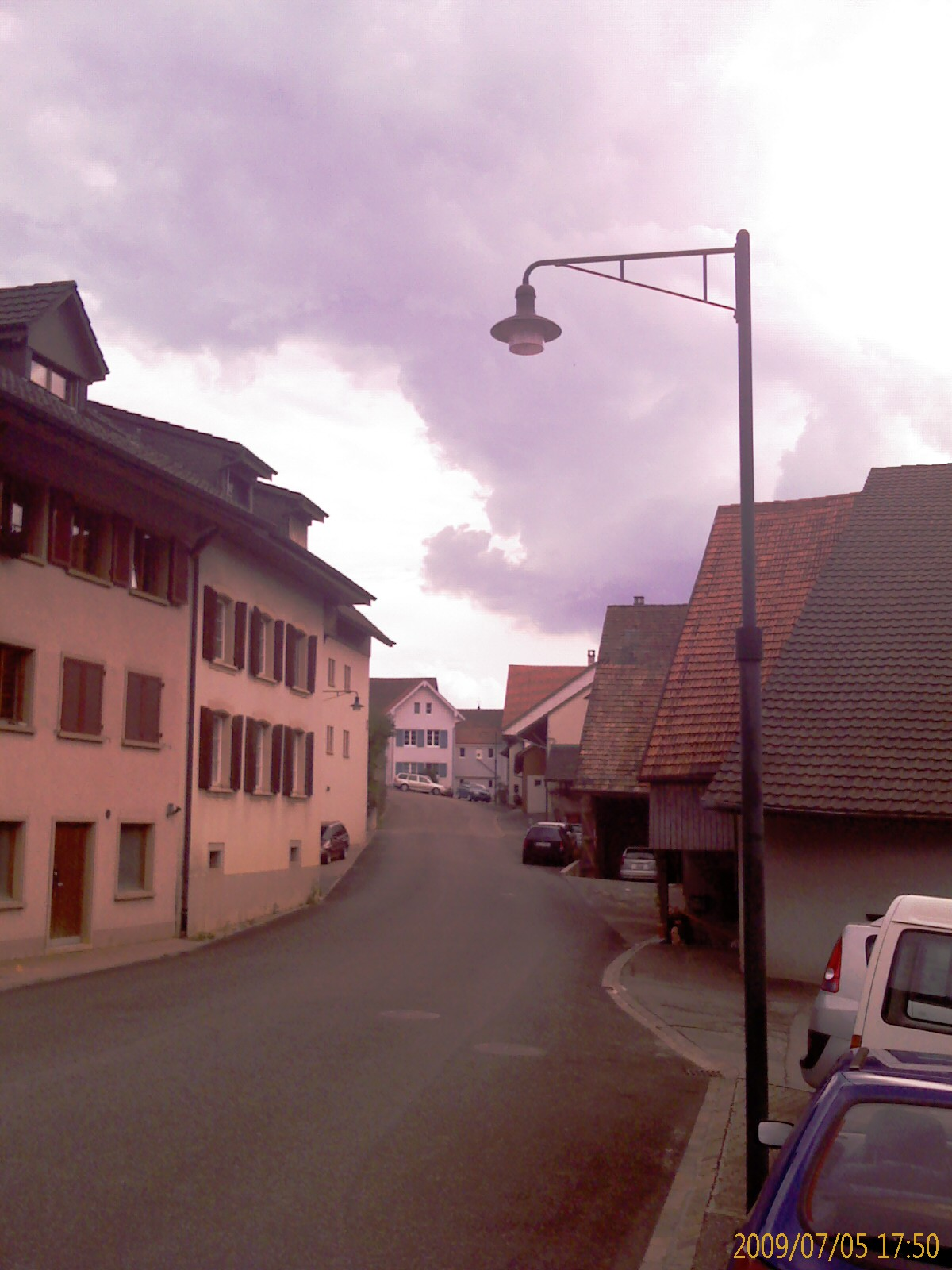
Street in Rickenbach

Rickenbach has a population (as of June 2021) of 612. As of 2008, 8.4% of the population are resident foreign nationals. Over the last 10 years (1997–2007) the population has changed at a rate of 8.6%.

Most of the population (as of 2000) speaks German (486 or 93.3%), with some type of Indo-Aryan languages being second most common (5 or 1%) and French being third (4 or 0.8%).

As of 2008, the gender distribution of the population was 50.5% male and 49.5% female. The population was made up of 510 Swiss citizens (92.2% of the population), and 43 non-Swiss residents (7.8%) Of the population in the municipality 151 or about 29.0% were born in Rickenbach and lived there in 2000. There were 164 or 31.5% who were born in the same canton, while 120 or 23.0% were born somewhere else in Switzerland, and 65 or 12.5% were born outside of Switzerland.

In 2008 there were 5 live births to Swiss citizens and were 3 deaths of Swiss citizens. Ignoring immigration and emigration, the population of Swiss citizens increased by 2 while the foreign population remained the same. There . At the same time, there were 2 non-Swiss men and 3 non-Swiss women who immigrated from another country to Switzerland. The total Swiss population change in 2008 (from all sources, including moves across municipal borders) was a decrease of 6 and the non-Swiss population decreased by 5 people. This represents a population growth rate of -2.0%.

The age distribution, as of 2010, in Rickenbach is; 39 children or 7.1% of the population are between 0 and 6 years old and 80 teenagers or 14.5% are between 7 and 19. Of the adult population, 58 people or 10.5% of the population are between 20 and 29 years old. 79 people or 14.3% are between 30 and 39, 112 people or 20.3% are between 40 and 49, and 129 people or 23.3% are between 50 and 64. The senior population distribution is 41 people or 7.4% of the population are between 65 and 79 years old and there are 15 people or 2.7% who are over 80.

As of 2000, there were 223 people who were single and never married in the municipality. There were 263 married individuals, 21 widows or widowers and 14 individuals who are divorced.

As of 2000, there were 198 private households in the municipality, and an average of 2.6 persons per household. There were 44 households that consist of only one person and 10 households with five or more people. Out of a total of 204 households that answered this question, 21.6% were households made up of just one person and 3 were adults who lived with their parents. Of the rest of the households, there are 62 married couples without children, 76 married couples with children There were 12 single parents with a child or children. There was 1 household that was made up unrelated people and 6 households that were made some sort of institution or another collective housing.

In 2000 there were 97 single family homes (or 62.6% of the total) out of a total of 155 inhabited buildings. There were 16 multi-family buildings (10.3%), along with 39 multi-purpose buildings that were mostly used for housing (25.2%) and 3 other use buildings (commercial or industrial) that also had some housing (1.9%). Of the single family homes 15 were built before 1919, while 22 were built between 1990 and 2000. The greatest number of single family homes (27) were built between 1981 and 1990.

In 2000 there were 219 apartments in the municipality. The most common apartment size was 4 rooms of which there were 58. There were 5 single room apartments and 84 apartments with five or more rooms. Of these apartments, a total of 189 apartments (86.3% of the total) were permanently occupied, while 22 apartments (10.0%) were seasonally occupied and 8 apartments (3.7%) were empty. As of 2007, the construction rate of new housing units was 7.2 new units per 1000 residents. The vacancy rate for the municipality, in 2008, was 0%.

The historical population is given in the following chart:

== Politics ==
In the 2007 federal election the most popular party was the SVP which received 43.01% of the vote. The next three most popular parties were the SP (18.21%), the Green Party (14.81%) and the FDP (10.26%). In the federal election, a total of 225 votes were cast, and the voter turnout was 54.9%.

== Economy ==
As of 2007, Rickenbach had an unemployment rate of 1.45%. As of 2005, there were 52 people employed in the primary economic sector and about 15 businesses involved in this sector. 9 people were employed in the secondary sector and there were 4 businesses in this sector. 12 people were employed in the tertiary sector, with 6 businesses in this sector. There were 287 residents of the municipality who were employed in some capacity, of which females made up 43.6% of the workforce.

In 2008 the total number of full-time equivalent jobs was 47. The number of jobs in the primary sector was 28, of which 27 were in agriculture and 1 was in forestry or lumber production. The number of jobs in the secondary sector was 9, of which 6 or (66.7%) were in manufacturing and 3 (33.3%) were in construction. The number of jobs in the tertiary sector was 10. In the tertiary sector; 1 was in a hotel or restaurant, 3 or 30.0% were technical professionals or scientists, 4 or 40.0% were in education.

In 2000, there were 11 workers who commuted into the municipality and 235 workers who commuted away. The municipality is a net exporter of workers, with about 21.4 workers leaving the municipality for every one entering. Of the working population, 21.3% used public transportation to get to work, and 51.2% used a private car.

== Religion ==
From the 2000 census, 73 or 14.0% were Roman Catholic, while 332 or 63.7% belonged to the Swiss Reformed Church. Of the rest of the population, there were 2 members of an Orthodox church (or about 0.38% of the population), there were 4 individuals (or about 0.77% of the population) who belonged to the Christian Catholic Church, and there were 6 individuals (or about 1.15% of the population) who belonged to another Christian church. There were 17 (or about 3.26% of the population) who were Islamic. There were 2 individuals who were Buddhist and 8 individuals who were Hindu. 62 (or about 11.90% of the population) belonged to no church, are agnostic or atheist, and 15 individuals (or about 2.88% of the population) did not answer the question.

== Education ==
In Rickenbach about 214 or (41.1%) of the population have completed non-mandatory upper secondary education, and 51 or (9.8%) have completed additional higher education (either university or a Fachhochschule). Of the 51 who completed tertiary schooling, 68.6% were Swiss men, 21.6% were Swiss women.

As of 2000, there were 80 students from Rickenbach who attended schools outside the municipality.
