= Decs (disambiguation) =

Decs is a village in Tolna county, Hungary.

Decs may also refer to:

- Health Sciences Descriptors, the multilingual standard terminology for the Virtual Health Library
- Department of Education (Philippines) (previously the Department of Education, Culture and Sports)
