= Decoud =

Decoud or DeCoud (/deɪˈkuː/ day-KOO) is a surname. Notable people with the surname include:

- José Segundo Decoud (1848–1909), Paraguayan politician
- Juan Francisco Decoud (1813–1897), Paraguayan military officer
- Sebastián Decoud (born 1981), Argentine tennis player
- Thomas DeCoud (born 1985), American football player
- Treston Decoud (born 1993), American football player
