= Bischofstein Castle (Germany) =

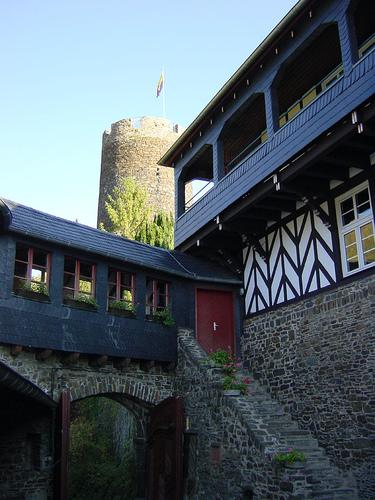
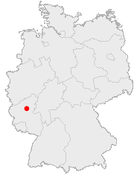
Picture	Map
Information
State:	Rhineland-Palatinate
County:	Mayen-Koblenz
Geographic Position:	50°12′49″N 7°23′2″E
Owner:	Verein zur Förderung des Fichte-Gymnasiums Krefeld und des Schullandheims Burg Bischofstein e. V.
Address of Owner:	Lindenstr. 52, 47798 Krefeld
Burg Address:	Schullandheim Burg Bischofstein; 56332 Hatzenport
Website:	www.fichte.de Menüpunkt Burg Bischofstein

Bischofstein Castle (German: Burg Bischofstein) is a castle by the Moselle in Germany. It sits between Moselkern and Hatzenport; these and the castle face the borough of Burgen. It was a stronghold belonging to the Archbishops of Treves.

Characteristics are its tall, cylindrical tower girt midway-up with white plaster and the ruinous walls of a small chapel adjoining. The tower is specifically a donjon, (a keep).

The castle was built in 1270, destroyed in 1689 and rebuilt again in 1930. It was purchased in 1954 by Fichte Gymnasium in Krefeld, Germany and currently serves as the school's retreat center.

== Geography ==
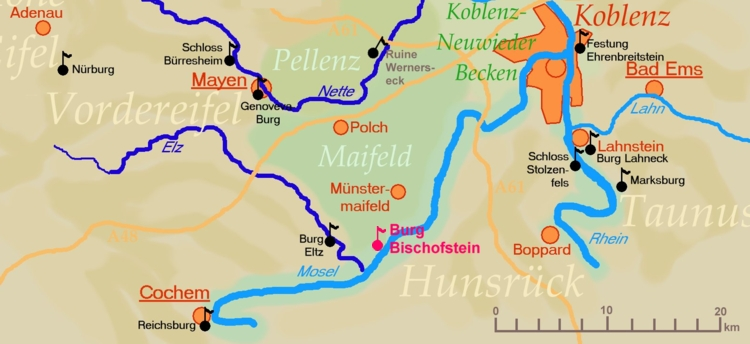
Position of Burg Bischofstein in the county of Mayen-Koblenz

Bischofstein Castle lies across from Burgen, Germany about halfway up a steep mountainside. The German public highway B 416 runs below the castle. This section of the road is also called Moselschieferstrasse. The closest large settlements are the little town of Cochem, which lies about 25 kilometres (16 mi) up the Moselle, and the city of Koblenz, which lies about 35 kilometres (22 mi) downriver.

To the north of the castle lies the plateau of Maifeld. The Baybach river, which carves gorges into the Hunsrück region of Rhineland-Palatinate, flowing into the Moselle opposite Bischofstein Castle. The neighbouring areas of Moselkern and Hatzenport are typical wine villages along the Moselle. Moselkern lies at the mouth of the Elzbach river, in the valley of which lies Eltz Castle. The wine makers of Hatzenport make a wine called Burg Bischofstein.

== History ==
=== The Castle of the Holy Bishop Nicetius ===
Folk tales and old Moselle-area historiographies allege that Bischofstein Castle began as the palace for the Holy Bishop Nicetius (527-566). These tales are based upon a poem by Bishop Venantius Fortunatus (530– ~600), who traveled through the Rhine and Moselle regions with East Frankish King Chilbert around the year 566.

In the 22-verse comprehensive poem, which is entitled "De castello nicetil espiscopi Trevirensis super Mosellam", Fortunas describes the magnificent Castle of Nicetius as having 30 towers, a palace with marble columns and a mighty tower protecting it from across the Moselle.

One clue that the castle described in the poem is actually Burg Bishofstein comes from a torn piece of parchment written by historian Browner in 1670 which references the poem's title "De castello Bischofstein super Mosellam aB. Nicetio extrueto". The validity of this parchment was already being debated in the mid 18th century by historian and auxiliary bishop Johann Nikolaus von Hontheim. The actual location of the Castle of Nicetius is unknown, but it is accepted that it is somewhere in the Kobern region of Germany. In any case, it is no longer accepted as the precursor for Burg Bischofstein.

=== 1270 to 1824 ===
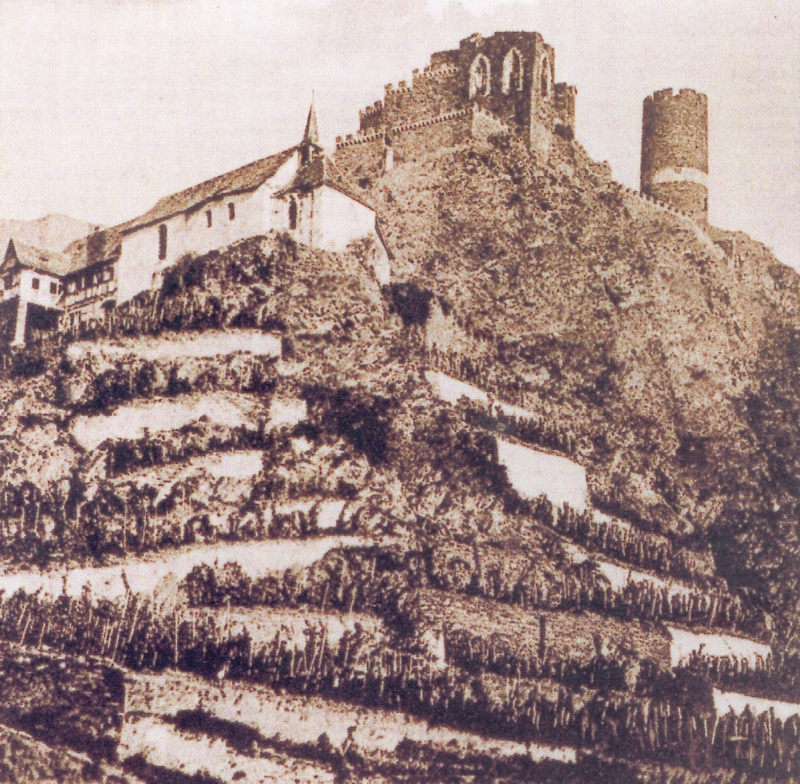
The oldest known photograph of Burg Bischofstein (before 1884)

Burg Bischofstein was probably built in 1270. Archbishop Arnold II. von Isenburg is often cited as the builder, but this is doubtful, as he was appointed Archbishop in 1242. By this time, Archdeacon of Trier Heinrich von Bolanden, who is documented as completing the construction of Burg Bischofstein. This comes from a document dated June 10, 1242 in which von Bolanden promised to replace the Monasteries of Laach and Rumerdorf Schulden. This document was approved by Pope Innocent IV himself on October 29, 1246.

The original builders are unknown. It is known, however, that Heinrich von Bolanden bought the half-completed Burg and paid for the rest of the construction himself. This is confirmed in a document dated September 11, 1273. In this document, von Bolanden bequeathed the completed Burg Bischofstein unto the Church of Trier. The conditions of the bestowal were such that he and all subsequent holders of his office would have a lifelong abode and that they should keep feudal responsibility over the Burg. As a reward for von Bolanden all of the then accepted feudal duties were fulfilled.

His successor Hermann von Weilnau granted Arch Bishop Peter von Nassau the fee-simple to Burg Bischofstein in 1303. In the event of war, Burg Bischofstein was at the Arch Bishop's disposal. Heinrich von Pfaffendorf, the third Archdeacon of Bischofstein, pledged in 1329 that:

- he would not tolerate any enemies of the Archbishop at the Burg
- he would protect the section of the Moselle above which the Burg stood
- he would not accommodate any vassals at the Burg without the approval of the Arch Bishop.

Other successors were Gottfried von Brandenburg and Friedrich Pfalzgraf bei Rhein. After 1501 there is no record of investiture.

It is said that in 1552 Markgraf Albrecht von Brandenburg attempted, without success, to besiege Bischofstein. This is, however, undocumented.

The Thirty Years' War negatively affected the Moselle. For example, on October 26, 1631, Louis XIV left the nearby village of Münstermaifeld destroyed. Despite this, a detailed visitor log in the Burg's chapel from 1680 indicates that Burg Bischofstein endured the war without damage. In 1688, during the War of the Grand Alliance, Louis XIV sent troops to weaken the Palatinate following its refusal to ratify the Truce of Regensburg. These French troops succeeded in destroying Burg Bischofstein in 1689.

In 1794 the French annexed part of the Rhineland and the French regime liquidated many of the Church's possessions because they were seen as French national property. The ruins of Burg Bischofstein, which at that time belong to the St. Castor monastery in Karden, were treated as such. They were sold at a state auction to the winemaker Nicolaus Artz on September 29, 1803.

In 1824 it was reported that a house with seven inhabitants was built at the site of the ruins. After this the ownership of the ruins is unknown.

=== 1880 to today ===
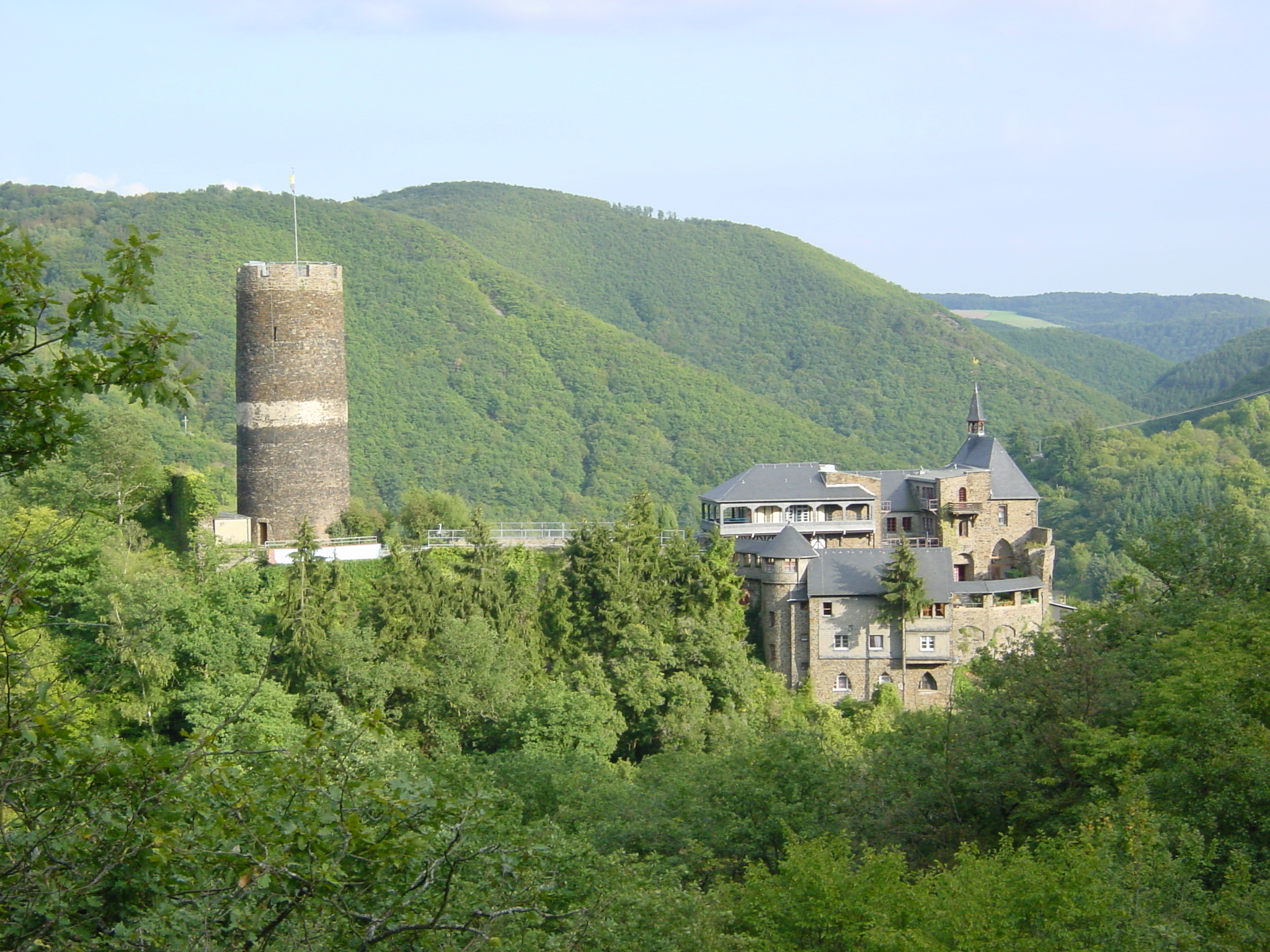
Burg Bischofstein in 2006

Until 1880 the castle lay in ruins. At this time the Burg belonged to the Bienen family from Rheinberg. On 11 April 1930 the heirs sold the castle to a businessman from Darmstadt named Erich Deku, who wanted to rebuild the castle for use as a summer home. It was not reconstructed, but used the preserved walls newly erected. In order to achieve this, builders had to create a pathway for construction vehicles. This partly required rock blasting. Deku furnished the Burg with an extensive art collection. Below the castle, he discovered a polyptych from 1530.

The reconstruction that stands today was completed by the Neuerburg family from Trier in 1938. Aenny Neuerburg bought the Burg at auction when bankruptcy proceedings against Deku were opened in 1936. The entire art collection was included in the offer.

From 1941 to 1946 the Burg served as a sanitorium for soldiers and as a hospital and refugee safehouse under the leadership of Aenny Neuerburg. Mrs. Neuerburg's son Raymond then took over the leadership position and with his family operated a hostel for foreigners. After Aenny's death the Neuerburg family put the Burg up for sale.

On 29 June 1954 the Schullandheimverein (association for the construction of a school retreat center) of Fichte Gymnasium in Krefeld bought the Burg for only 80,000 DM (about $360,000 today). They then began to construct the retreat center.

Today, Burg Bischofstein is a designated and protected historical spot; not as an 800-year-old castle, but as an example of the architectural style of the 1930s.

== Retreat center ==
Every year, Classes 5-9 and 11 from Fichte Gymnasium travel to Burg Bischofstein. Schools all around Germany also visit the Burg. During vacations the Burg is used predominantly by vacationing groups. Class reunions are also held there. A stay at the castle is a special experience for exchange students from many different countries.

=== Background ===
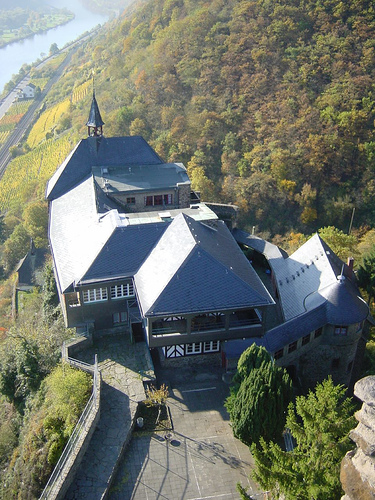
View of the dormitories from the top of the tower

At the beginning of the 1950s the Fichte Gymnasium in Krefeld began searching for its own retreat center. The newly formed „Schullandheim Fichte-Gymnasium e. V.“ (association for the construction of a school retreat center) saw Burg Bischofstein, with its structural condition and spacious layout, as most fitting.

On 29 June 1954 the executor of the late Mrs. Neuerburg's will approved the purchase of Burg Bischofstein. The transfer of ownership took place on 1 July 1954. The very same year, with great effort, the most basic facilities were purchased and the bedrooms, living rooms and the kitchen were renovated and equipped. The first visitors of the Burg were members of the 12th grade because several of the students had shown good technical skills. They painted, performed small repairs, and ensured that the Burg would be prepared for future visits. Since then, students from Fichte Gymnasium have enjoyed the pleasures of staying at Burg Bischofstein.

Until 1980 the Burg was only open to students from Fichte Gymnasium. At the beginning of the 1980s, for financial reasons, the Burg was opened to other schools in Krefeld and then to other groups and schools. Today students from virtually all regions in Germany visit Burg Bischofstein.

In the summer of 2004, the Burg celebrated its 50th year as a retreat center: 50 Jahre Schullandheim Burg Bischofstein.

=== Use ===
Today the Burg has a 12-bed dormitory and other dormitories, 2 rooms for teachers, a dining/meeting hall, a rec room with foosball and ping-pong tables, a kitchen, and storage rooms. The caretaker's residence is under the rec room.

== Tower ==
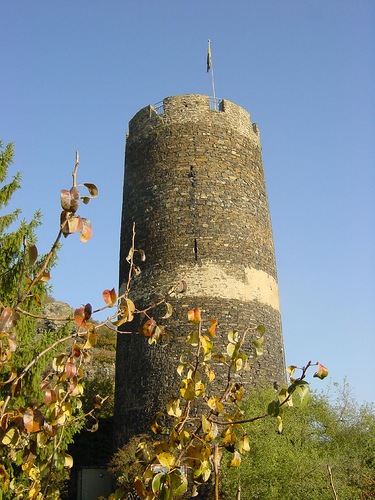
The tower with its white ring

The tower, 20 metres (66 ft) tall, is easily recognizable by the white ring about halfway up its height. The ring is a remaining piece of plaster. In the Middle Ages, it was common for castle towers to be completely plastered. Hundreds of years' weathering washed most of the plaster away. At the height of the ring there was originally a wooden parapet which was destroyed by fire in 1689 and so burned itself into the wall of the tower.

=== Renovation ===
In 1997 the tower underwent a renovation. The battlements were newly reinforced and the tower platform was completely reconstructed. Wooden steps were constructed inside the tower in the architectural style of the Middle Ages and today, visitors to Burg Bischofstein can climb to the top of the tower and enjoy the beautiful view of the Moselle Valley. The city flag of Krefeld flies at the tower summit.

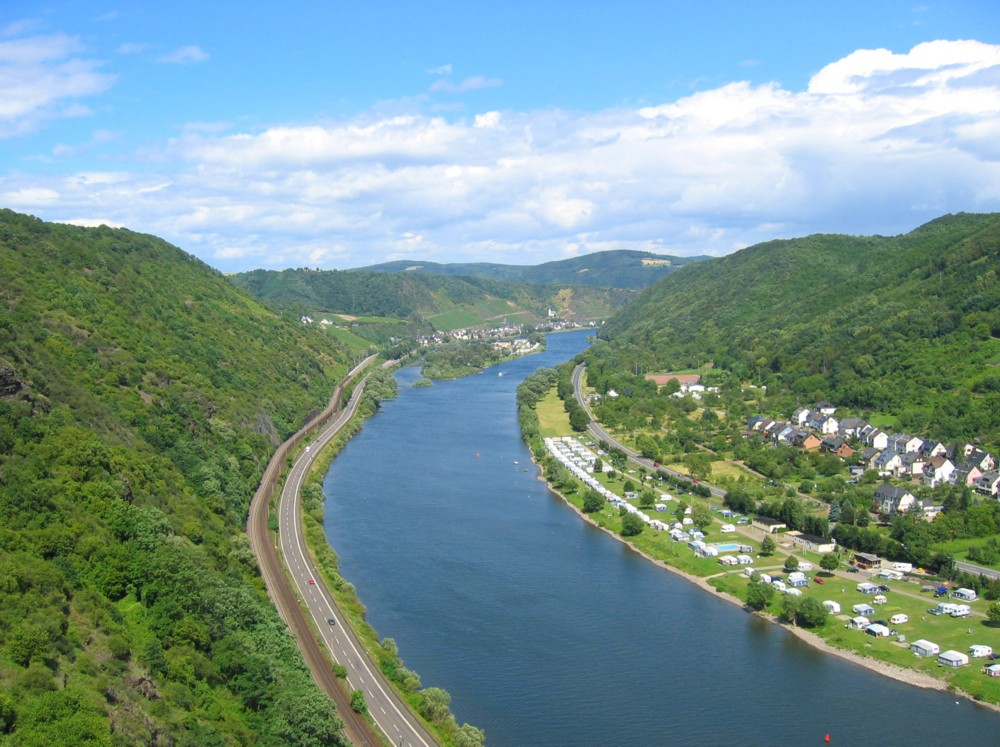
View of the Moselle and Hatzenport from the top of the tower

=== Stories ===
Through history, many tales have been spun about the tower and its white ring. One explains that bands of robbers regularly attacked tradesmen on the trade route that the Burg protected. To put an end to this, Bischof von Trier put the ring around the tower, and said that every captured robber would be then hanged from it to demonstrate to others what would become of those of this kind”.

Another story claims that there was a huge flood and the ring marks the high-water mark, while another version asserts that Bischof von Trier once freed the tower's Lord from the flood. To thank him for this, the Lord fixed the ring to the tower as a symbol of the "Bischof's ring" and at the flood level of the Moselle.

== Literature ==
- Flo, Winfried Schorre: Burg Bischofstein an der Mosel. Görres-Druckerei GmbH und Verlag, Koblenz 2002, ISBN 3-935690-02-9
