= Bischofstein Castle (Switzerland) =

Castle in Sissach, Switzerland

- Sissach
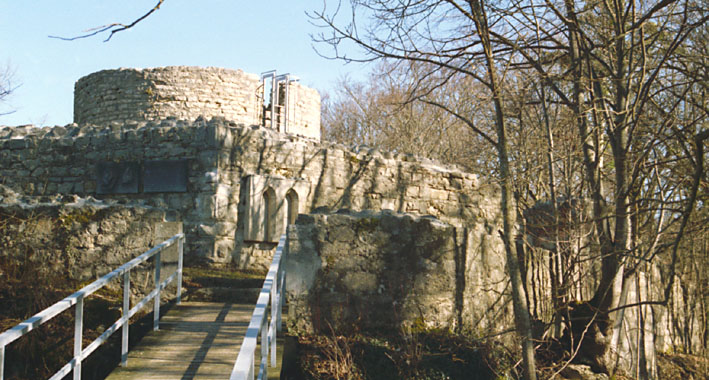
- Zwinger, gatehouse and tower

Site information
- Type: hill castle
- Code: CH-BL
- Condition: Extensive, preserved walls

Location
- Coordinates: 47°28′28.72″N 7°49′37.32″E
- Height: 698 m above the sea

Site history
- Built: Mid 13th century
- Materials: Stone

Bishofstein Castle (German: Burg Bischofstein or Ruine Bischofstein) is a castle in the municipality of Sissach of the canton of Basel-Land in Switzerland. It is a Swiss heritage site of national significance.

== See also ==
- List of castles in Switzerland
