= Bözberg Tunnel =

Bözberg Tunnel may refer to three adjacent tunnels under the Bözberg Pass in the Swiss canton of Aargau:

- The Bözberg Rail Tunnel completed 1875: Bözberg Rail Tunnel#1875 tunnel
- The Bözberg Rail Tunnel completed 2020: Bözberg Rail Tunnel#2020 tunnel
- The Bözberg Road Tunnel completed 1996
