= Böztal =

- Municipality
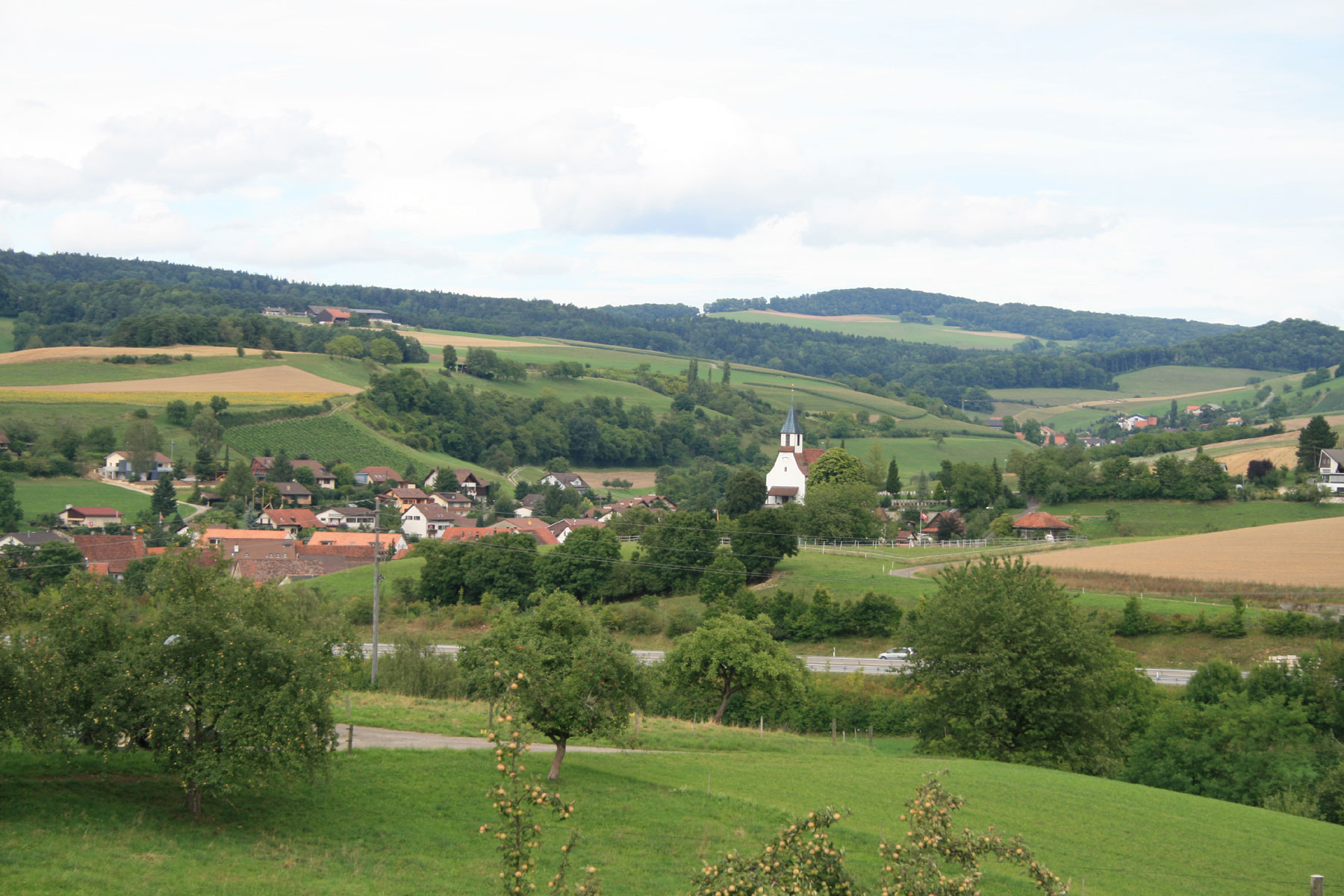
- Bözen village

- Flag Coat of arms
- Location of Böztal
- Location within Switzerland Location within Canton of Aargau
- Coordinates: 47°30′00″N 08°03′47″E
- Country: Switzerland
- Canton: Aargau
- District: Laufenburg

Area
  - Total: 22.30 km^{2} (8.61 sq mi)
- Elevation: 383 m (1,257 ft)

Population (2020)
  - Total: 2,755
  - Density: 123.5/km^{2} (320.0/sq mi)
- Time zone: UTC+01:00 (CET)
  - Summer (DST): UTC+02:00 (CEST)
- Postal codes: 5075; 5076; 5077; 5078
- SFOS number: 4185
- ISO 3166 code: CH-AG
- Website: www.boeztal.ch

Böztal is a municipality in the district of Laufenburg in the canton of Aargau in Switzerland. It was established on 1 January 2022 with the merger of the municipalities of Bözen, Effingen, Elfingen and Hornussen.

== History ==
In November 2009, the municipal assemblies of the five municipalities Bözen, Effingen, Elfingen, Hornussen and Zeihen west of Bözberg Pass had to decide whether to cooperate and include a merger should be examined. While Effingen, Elfingen and Zeihen agreed with large majorities at the time, Bözen and Hornussen rejected the corresponding application. A merger of only the consenting communities was not pursued.

In early 2013, an interest group was formed in Bözen, which again sought to merge the municipalities. Zeihen announced in September 2014 that it would not participate in a potential merger. In June 2017, the municipal assemblies of Bözen, Effingen, Elfingen and Hornussen approved the start of official merger clarifications and the formation of working groups. These were active from January to September 2018. In a consultative survey, the narrow majority of respondents opted for "Oberes Fricktal" as the future community name (other possible answers were "Rebthal", "Böztal" and "Unterberg"). After the results were presented in January 2019, there was criticism from several surrounding communities, as the intended name could lead to confusion with the region of the same name, which covers a much larger area. Executive Councilor Urs Hofmann then recommended looking for possible alternatives for "Oberes Fricktal". In a second survey in April 2019, the three remaining proposals from the first round were up for selection, with "Böztal" being the most popular.

At that time, Hornussen already belonged to the district of Laufenburg, and the three other municipalities belonged to the district of Brugg. According to the merger agreement and with the consent of the Grand Council, the new municipality of Böztal would join the district of Laufenburg, which resulted in a change of district for three formerly independent municipalities. The seat of the municipal administration is Hornussen. On 27 June 2019, the municipal assemblies of Bözen, Effingen, Elfingen and Hornussen approved the merger agreement. In the referendum held on 24 November 2019, all four municipalities approved the merger. The results were as follows:

- Bözen: 236 yes to 83 no (turnout 55%)
- Effingen: 167 yes to 112 no (turnout 67%)
- Elfingen: 90 yes to 40 no (turnout 57%)
- Hornussen: 186 yes to 99 no (turnout 45%)

When designing the new coat of arms, 15 suggestions were made. Finally, a committee chose four coats of arms from this selection, which could then be voted on. The population decided with a vast majority for the new coat of arms.
