= Kerenzerberg Tunnel =

The Kerenzerberg Tunnel may refer to:

- The Kerenzerberg Tunnel (rail), a rail tunnel in the Swiss canton of Glarus
- The Kerenzerberg Tunnel (road), a road tunnel in the Swiss canton of Glarus
