= Bözberg Rail Tunnel =

Railway tunnel in the Swiss canton of Aargau

Old Bözberg Rail Tunnel
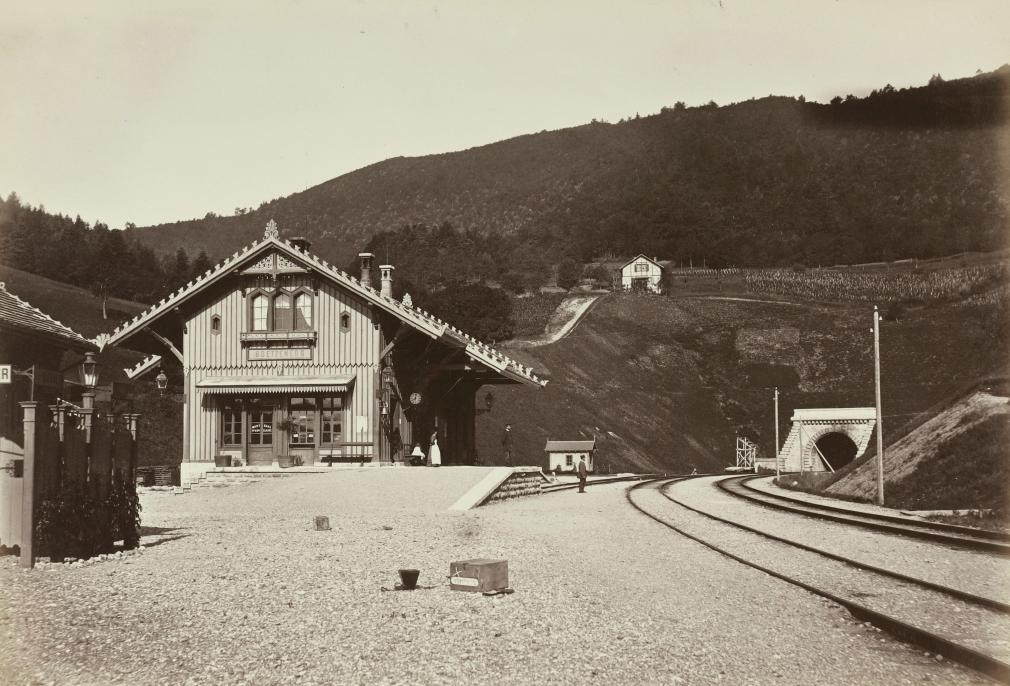
- South portal in 1875
- Interactive map of Old Bözberg Rail Tunnel

Overview
- Other name: Bözbergtunnel
- Line: Bözberg
- Location: Aargau, Switzerland
- Coordinates: 47°27′55″N 8°7′1″E

Operation
- Opened: 1875
- Closed: 2020 (rail tunnel)
- Owner: Swiss Federal Railways, previous: Bötzbergbahn (BöB)
- Operator: Swiss Federal Railways
- Traffic: Rail
- Character: Passenger and freight

Technical
- Length: 2,526 metres (1.570 mi)
- No. of tracks: 2
- Track gauge: 1,435 mm (4 ft 8 1/2 in)
- Electrified: Overhead catenary 15 kV AC 16 2/3 Hz

The Bözberg Rail Tunnel is a railway tunnel in the Swiss canton of Aargau. It takes the Bözberg railway line of the Swiss Federal Railways under the Bözberg Pass between Effingen and Schinznach-Dorf. The original tunnel was opened during 1875; it is set to be closed to rail traffic during 2020-2021 following the commissioning of its replacement, after which it shall be converted and retained for service and rescue purposes in respect to its successor.

During March 2016, construction commenced on the new Bözberg Tunnel, which runs roughly parallel to its predecessor. It is a considerably wider and longer tunnel, being able to accommodate trains up to a height of 4 metres (13 ft). The reason for its construction is to better accommodate larger and heavier freight trains. The second Bözberg Rail Tunnel is scheduled to be opened during 2020.

== 1875 tunnel ==
The tunnel forms a key element of the Bözberg railway line, carrying a pair of standard gauge (1,435 mm or 4 ft 8 1/2 in) tracks underground along a distance of 2,526 metres (8,287 ft). These tracks are electrified at 15 kV AC 16 2/3 Hz using overhead catenary. The alignment of the tunnel runs roughly parallel to the later Bözberg Road Tunnel on the A3 motorway.

The tunnel has become a key structure on the Gotthard freight corridor route, according to SBB Cargo, the maximum tonnage of trains on the route is around 1,600 tonnes. However, during the 2010s, the original tunnel's loading gauge was deemed to be insufficient and that work would be necessary in order to realise ambitions for this corridor to provide a headroom of 4 metres (13 ft) throughout its length, allowing for the haulage of taller freight trains, resulting in a reduction in the numbers of lorries traversing the road network. Addressing the non-compliant Bözberg Tunnel has been referred to as the most major undertaking of the initiative; a further 20 tunnels also required enlargement work for the initiative, along with numerous platforms, overpasses, signalling systems, and electrical infrastructure.

Studies were conducted into proposed remedial work to expand the loading gauge, which found that such efforts would involve a six-year timeframe that would heavily impact existing traffic operations throughout; an alternative approach of constructing a larger second tunnel alongside the original gained favour instead. The new Bözberg Tunnel shall replace the old one. Following the completion of the new tunnel, the original bore shall be retained but be modified for access use to the new bore, which is intended for both service and rescue purposes in a safe manner. The modification work, which is planned to be completed during 2022, shall involve the construction of five cross-shafts for access between the new and old tunnels.

== 2020 tunnel ==
New Bözberg Rail Tunnel
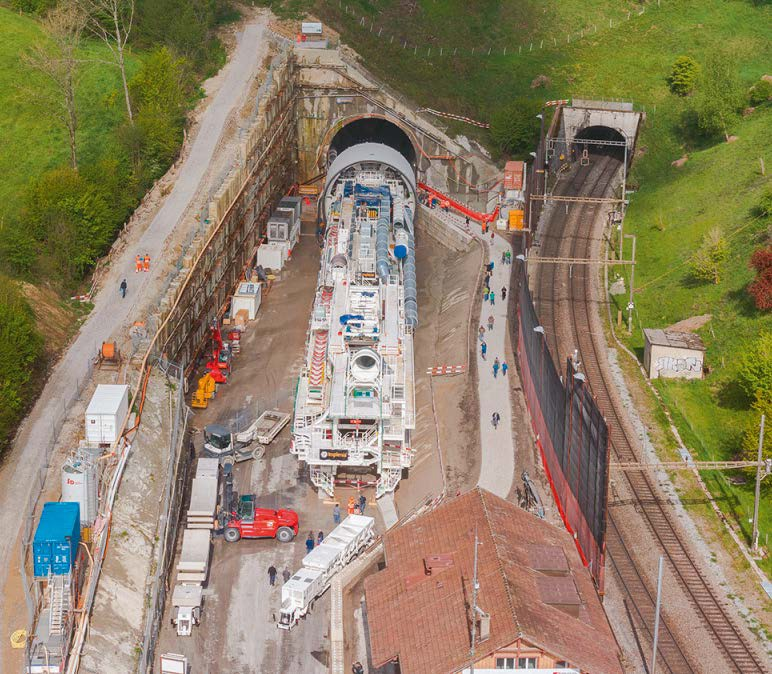
- New tunnel is built next to the old one (ca. 2017)
- Interactive map of New Bözberg Rail Tunnel

Overview
- Line: Bözberg
- Location: Aargau, Switzerland
- Coordinates: 47.4649°N 8.1164°E
- Status: Active

Operation
- Work began: 2016
- Opened: November 2020
- Owner: Swiss Federal Railways
- Operator: Swiss Federal Railways
- Traffic: Rail
- Character: Passenger and freight

Technical
- Length: 2,693 metres (8,835 ft)
- No. of tracks: 2
- Track gauge: 1,435 mm (4 ft 8 1/2 in)

The Swiss Federal Office of Transport permitted the construction of a new Bözberg railway tunnel, to parallel the existing one, at a cost of SFr 350m. The new tunnel's northern portal is located at Effingen and the southern portal at Schinznach-Dorf. During July 2015, a contract was awarded to Implenia to perform the construction of the new tunnel itself as well as any associated works. Preparatory work begun during October 2015.

On 9 March 2016, construction of the new Bözberg Tunnel commenced. The majority of the excavation was conducted from the southern portal using a tunnel boring machine (TBM); use of the TBM commenced during May 2017 following seven months of conventional excavation work. The excavated spoil was removed from the tunnel by rail, using three trains per day to transfer a daily average rate of 1,800 tonnes of material to Möriken-Wildegg, where it was subsequently used in restoration work at the Oberegg limestone quarry. Considerable care was paid in minimising the risks involved in working close to the original tunnel, which remained active throughout the boring process; accordingly, a series of continuous monitoring systems were active onsite at all times, along with emergency evacuation preparations. For extra protection during the last 60 meters of the TBM's boring, a temporary protection wall was deployed in the original tunnel.

Progress within the tunnel was relatively steady, despite varying geology along its path; the rate of advance was sometimes as high as 40 meters per day, achieve by crews working in two shifts of eight hours each per workday. The lining of the tunnel differs along its length, as only some areas required full waterproofing measures; the inner lining was heavily reinforced to withstand swelling by the surrounding ground in addition to water pressure. On 29 November 2017, the TBM achieved breakthrough in the new bore. During November 2019, work begun on laying the track, which is supported by slab-type sleepers. On 6 February 2020, the final sleeper was laid, marking a major milestone in the tunnel's fitting-out process. Railway operations using the new tunnel are anticipated to begin during October 2020.
