= Hornussen, Aargau =

Hornussen
- Former municipality
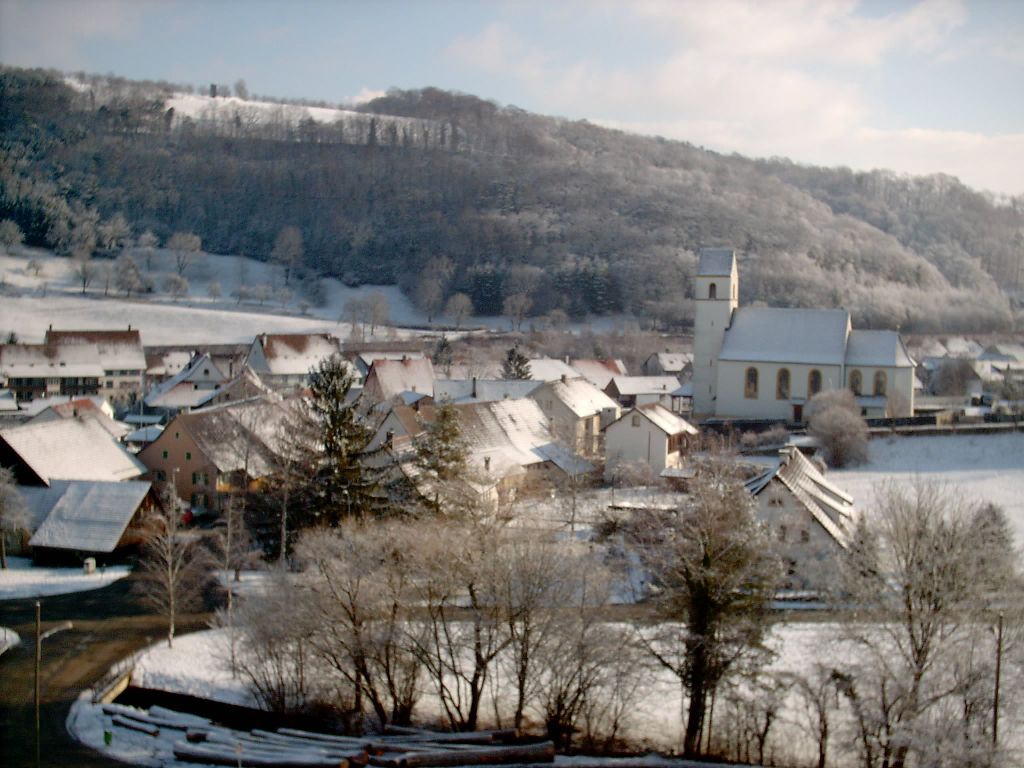

- Flag Coat of arms
- Location of Hornussen
- Location within Switzerland Location within Canton of Aargau
- Coordinates: 47°30′N 8°4′E
- Country: Switzerland
- Canton: Aargau
- District: Laufenburg

Area
  - Total: 7.27 km^{2} (2.81 sq mi)
- Elevation: 382 m (1,253 ft)

Population (December 2006)
  - Total: 845
  - Density: 116/km^{2} (301/sq mi)
- Time zone: UTC+01:00 (CET)
  - Summer (DST): UTC+02:00 (CEST)
- Postal code: 5075
- SFOS number: 4167
- ISO 3166 code: CH-AG
- Surrounded by: Bözen, Elfingen, Frick, Ittenthal, Sulz, Ueken, Zeihen
- Website: hornussen.ch

Hornussen is a former municipality in the district of Laufenburg in the canton of Aargau in Switzerland. On 1 January 2022 the former municipalities of Bözen, Effingen, Elfingen and Hornussen merged into the new municipality of Böztal.

== History ==
Scattered archeological discoveries indicate that the land that would become Hornussen was lightly occupied during the Stone Age. During the Roman era, it was located on the important route over the Bözberg. However, the first mention of Hornussen is in 1281 as Hornescon. Until the 1802 Act of Mediation, all manor rights to the village were held by collegiate church of Säckingen. Until 1797 it was part of the Austrian-Habsburg Rheinfelden District. Since 1803 Hornussen has belong to the Canton of Aargau. Starting in the 15th century, the Manor of Hornussen had a formal special status within the Habsburg territory. The lord of the manor was the court of appeals for all of Säckingen and also the economic center of the district. This is evident in the administration building from 1595, and other late gothic houses along the Bözbergstrasse. Thanks to its location on the border to the Bernese Aargau, the village remained largely spared destruction by war, which is why many of the old buildings were preserved.

The rights to appoint the pastor of the church of St. Mauritius was held by the church at Säckingen. The present building dates from 1710 to 1712. As early as 1600 there was an annual pilgrimage from the village to Todtmoos in the Black Forest.

Aerial view from 600 m by Walter Mittelholzer (1925)

Besides agriculture, the hospitality industry played a major role in Hornussen starting in the Middle Ages. It was a changing station for the first stage in crossing the Bözberg. In the 19th century the home straw plaiting industry entered the village, and at the end of the 19th century a popular wine was produced in the region. Hornussen was connected to the Bözbergbahn train line in 1875. Nevertheless, the migration to the industrial regions and overseas was considerable. In 1917, the predecessor of today's soap and cosmetics factory was founded. Since 1996, the A3 motorway has reduced the amount of through traffic in the village. In 2000, four fifths of the population of commuters.

== Geography ==
Hornussen has an area, as of 2009, of 7.27 square kilometers (2.81 sq mi). Of this area, 3.56 km^{2} (1.37 sq mi) or 49.0% is used for agricultural purposes, while 2.9 km^{2} (1.1 sq mi) or 39.9% is forested. Of the rest of the land, 0.82 km^{2} (0.32 sq mi) or 11.3% is settled (buildings or roads), 0.04 km^{2} (9.9 acres) or 0.6% is either rivers or lakes.

Of the built up area, housing and buildings made up 3.9% and transportation infrastructure made up 6.6%. Of the wooded land, 38.1% of the total land area is heavily forested and 1.8% is covered with orchards or small clusters of trees. Of the agricultural land, 34.1% is used for growing crops and 12.0% is pastures, while 2.9% is used for orchards or vine crops. All the water in the municipality is in rivers and streams.

The municipality is located in the Laufenburg district, in the upper Fricktal (Frick river valley). It grew out of the construction below the church hill during the 18th and 19th Centuries. It consists of the linear village of Hornussen. The municipalities of Bözen, Effingen, Elfingen, Hornussen and Zeihen are considering a merger some time in the future into a new municipality with an as yet (as of 2010) undetermined name.

== Coat of arms ==
The blazon of the municipal coat of arms is Gules a Ploughshare inverted and on a Chief Argent three Mullets of Five of the first in fess.

== Demographics ==
Hornussen has a population (as of December 2020) of 1,021. As of June 2009, 13.4% of the population are foreign nationals. Over the last 10 years (1997–2007) the population has changed at a rate of 13.8%. Most of the population (as of 2000) speaks German (91.3%), with Italian being second most common (2.5%) and Albanian being third (1.8%).

The age distribution, as of 2008, in Hornussen is; 79 children or 8.9% of the population are between 0 and 9 years old and 111 teenagers or 12.5% are between 10 and 19. Of the adult population, 119 people or 13.4% of the population are between 20 and 29 years old. 134 people or 15.1% are between 30 and 39, 152 people or 17.2% are between 40 and 49, and 130 people or 14.7% are between 50 and 59. The senior population distribution is 79 people or 8.9% of the population are between 60 and 69 years old, 42 people or 4.7% are between 70 and 79, there are 29 people or 3.3% who are between 80 and 89, and there are 10 people or 1.1% who are 90 and older.

As of 2000 the average number of residents per living room was 0.61 which is about equal to the cantonal average of 0.57 per room. In this case, a room is defined as space of a housing unit of at least 4 m^{2} (43 sq ft) as normal bedrooms, dining rooms, living rooms, kitchens and habitable cellars and attics. About 63.6% of the total households were owner occupied, or in other words did not pay rent (though they may have a mortgage or a rent-to-own agreement).

As of 2000, there were 25 homes with 1 or 2 persons in the household, 172 homes with 3 or 4 persons in the household, and 108 homes with 5 or more persons in the household. As of 2000, there were 315 private households (homes and apartments) in the municipality, and an average of 2.6 persons per household. In 2008 there were 177 single family homes (or 45.6% of the total) out of a total of 388 homes and apartments. There were a total of 3 empty apartments for a 0.8% vacancy rate. As of 2007, the construction rate of new housing units was 11.7 new units per 1000 residents.

In the 2007 federal election the most popular party was the SVP which received 42.4% of the vote. The next three most popular parties were the CVP (27.3%), the SP (10.4%) and the Green Party (5.9%).

The entire Swiss population is generally well educated. In Hornussen about 74.7% of the population (between age 25–64) have completed either non-mandatory upper secondary education or additional higher education (either university or a Fachhochschule). Of the school age population (in the 2008/2009 school year), there are 54 students attending primary school in the municipality.

The historical population is given in the following table:

Historical population
| Year | Pop. | ±% |
|---|---|---|
| 1768 | 387 | — |
| 1850 | 766 | +97.9% |
| 1900 | 590 | −23.0% |
| 1950 | 631 | +6.9% |
| 2000 | 816 | +29.3% |

== Heritage sites of national significance ==
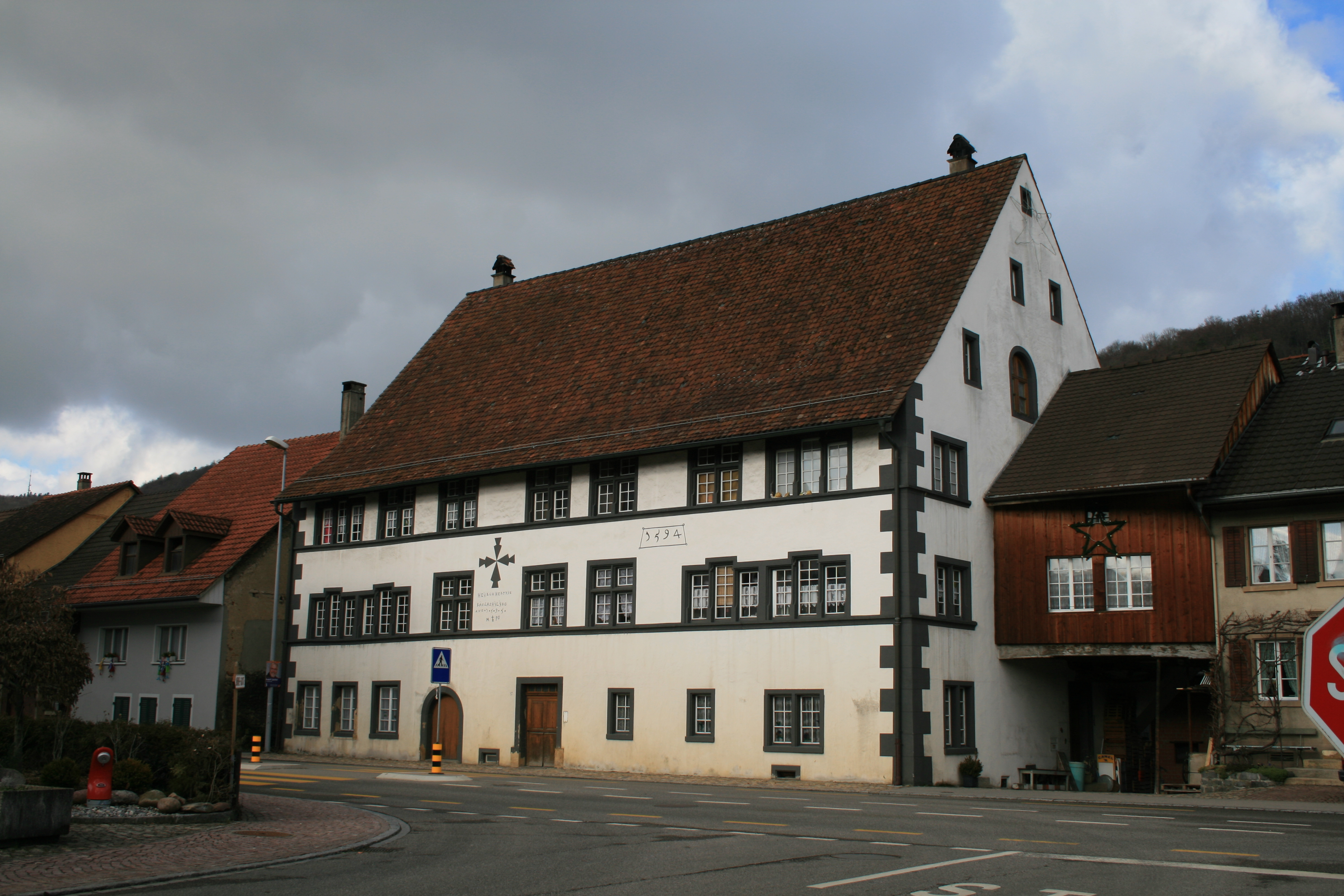
Säckinger Amtshaus, built in 1594

The former Säckinger Amtshaus at Hauptstrasse 37 is listed as a Swiss heritage site of national significance. The entire village of Hornussen is designated as part of the Inventory of Swiss Heritage Sites.

== Economy ==
As of 2007, Hornussen had an unemployment rate of 2.42%. As of 2005, there were 42 people employed in the primary economic sector and about 15 businesses involved in this sector. 61 people are employed in the secondary sector and there are 8 businesses in this sector. 68 people are employed in the tertiary sector, with 21 businesses in this sector.

In 2000 there were 430 workers who lived in the municipality. Of these, 358 or about 83.3% of the residents worked outside Hornussen while 116 people commuted into the municipality for work. There were a total of 188 jobs (of at least 6 hours per week) in the municipality. Of the working population, 18.8% used public transportation to get to work, and 54.6% used a private car.

== Religion ==
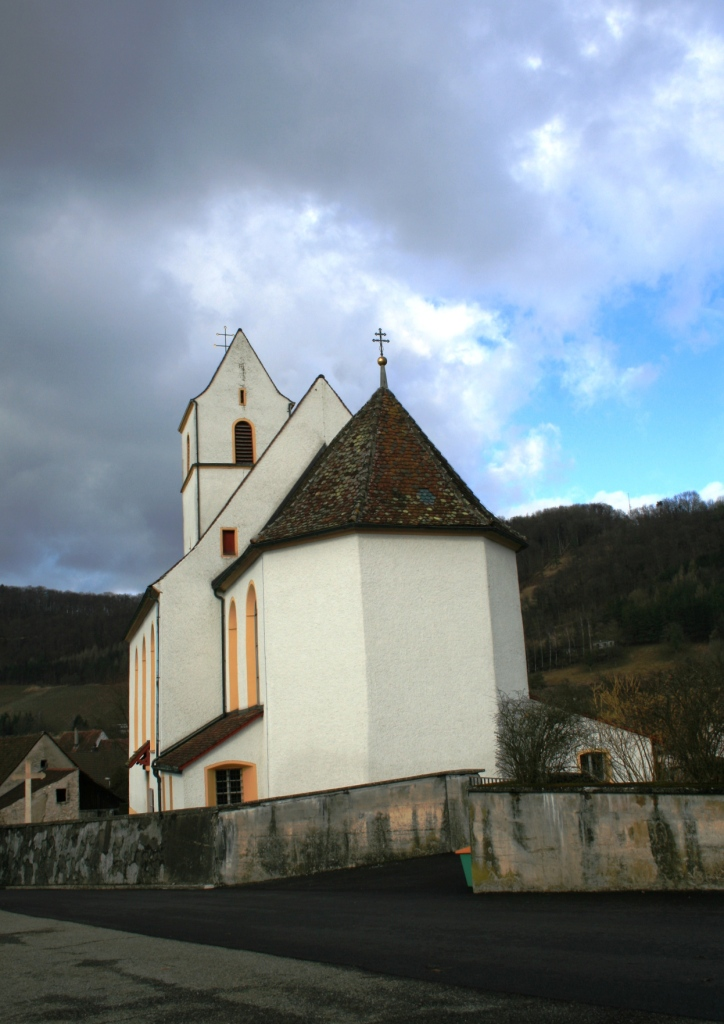
Hornussen church

From the 2000 census, 445 or 54.5% were Roman Catholic, while 219 or 26.8% belonged to the Swiss Reformed Church. Of the rest of the population, there were 4 individuals (or about 0.49% of the population) who belonged to the Christian Catholic faith.
