= Kerenzerberg Pass =

Mountain pass in Glarus, Switzerland

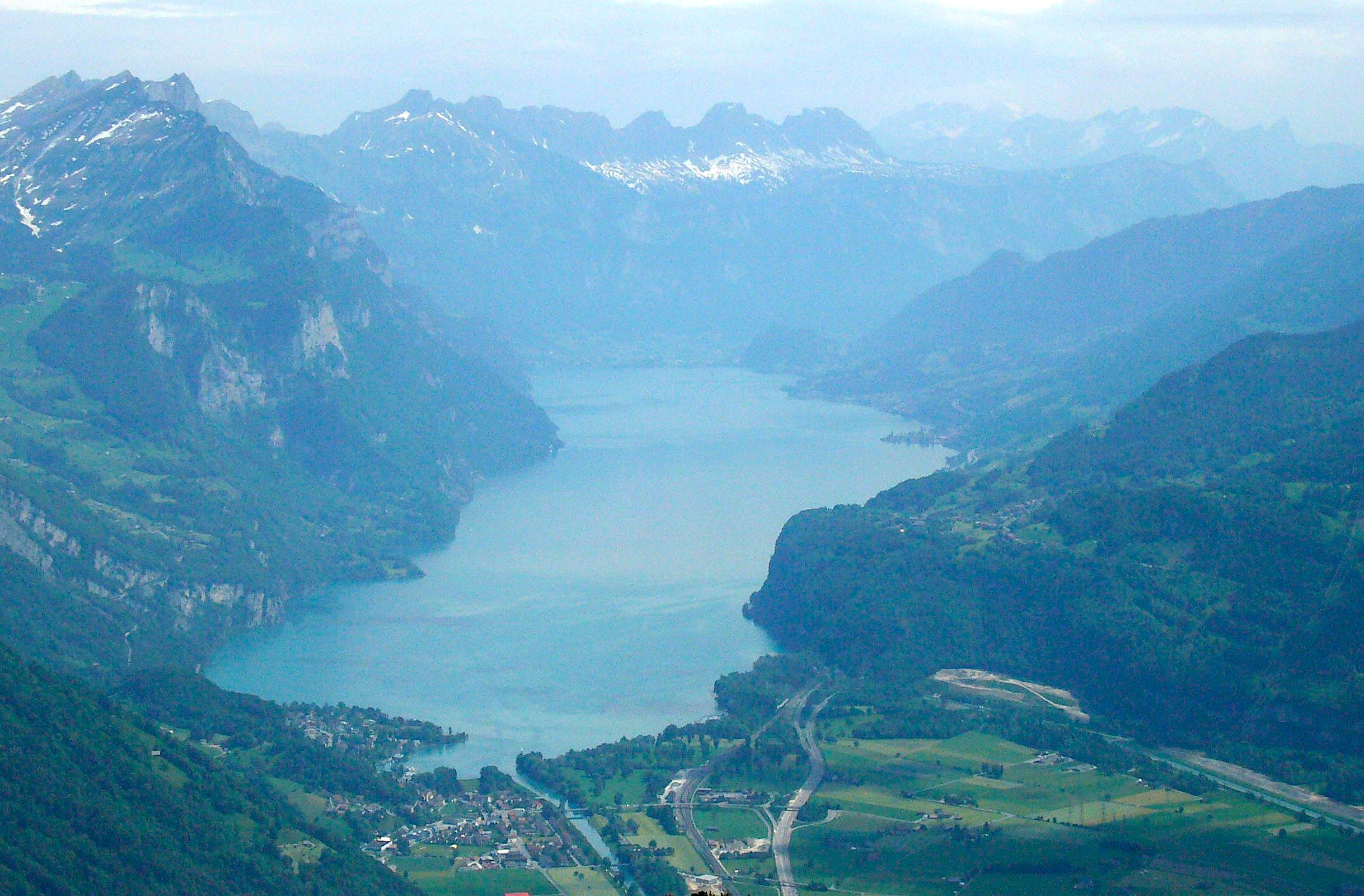
- Kerenzerberg (bottom right) and Lake Walen
- Interactive map of Kerenzerberg Pass
- Elevation: 743 metres (2,438 ft)

Third Approach
- Location: Switzerland
- Range: Glarus Alps
- Coordinates: 47°7′15″N 9°7′40″E

Kerenzerberg Pass (el. 743 m (2,438 ft)) is a mountain pass in the Alps in the canton of Glarus, Switzerland. It connects Mollis and Mühlehorn above Lake Walen (Walensee).

The pass road was built in 1848 and has a maximum grade of 10 percent. Two tunnels have been dug under the pass, a road tunnel for the A3 motorway (Autobahn A3) and a rail tunnel for the Ziegelbrücke to Sargans railway line. The latter replaced a series of previously built railway tunnels along the lake; this old route has been converted to a bike route (National Route 9).

The area is known for both summer and winter sport.

== See also ==
- List of highest paved roads in Europe
- List of mountain passes
