= Bözberg Pass =

Mountain pass in the Jura Mountains in the canton of Aargau in Switzerland

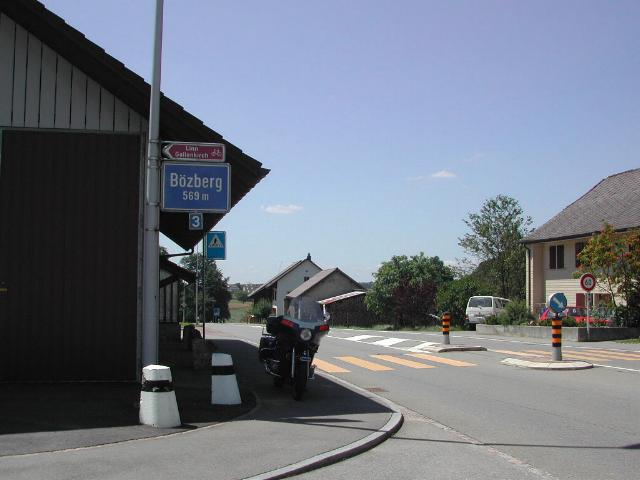
- Bözberg Pass
- Interactive map of Bözberg Pass
- Elevation: 569 metres (1,867 ft)

Third Approach
- Location: Switzerland
- Range: Jura Mountains
- Coordinates: 47°28′52″N 8°8′20″E

Bözberg Pass (el. 569 m.) is a mountain pass in the Jura Mountains in the canton of Aargau in Switzerland.

It connects the Frick River valley and Brugg and is the shortest road between Basel and Zürich.

Two tunnels have been dug under the pass, the Bözberg Rail Tunnel for the Federal Railway and the Bözberg Road Tunnel for the A-3 Autobahn.

== History ==
In Roman times, the pass was known as Mons Vocetius; it formed an important link between Augusta Raurica and Vindonissa. The Roman road ran somewhat north of the present route, and a stretch of it can be seen near Effingen. It was the site of the final defeat of the Helvetii in AD 69, following their uprising in the civil war of Galba. Aulus Caecina Alienus routed the remnants of the Helvetian forces at Mons Vocetius, after which the Helvetian capital at Aventicum was forced to surrender (Tacitus, Hist. 1.67-69).

During the Middle Ages, there were three different roads over the pass, all of which started from Effingen. The northern one followed the route of the Roman road to the ferries at Lauffohr and Stilli, the middle one through Unterbözberg to Brugg, and the southern one through Gallenkirch and Linn to the ferry at Birrenlauf (Schinznach-Bad).

The middle route won out, even though it was swampy and steep (with grades up to 20 percent) and too small for large coaches. Commercial traffic took a detour until the city of Bern built a better road between 1773 and 1779.

The railway line was opened in 1875. With the advent of the automobile, the pass developed heavy traffic. In 1995, the year before the completion of the tunnel, 12,500 vehicles crossed the pass per day. Today, only about 3500 vehicles cross the pass each day.
