= Elfingen =

- Former municipality
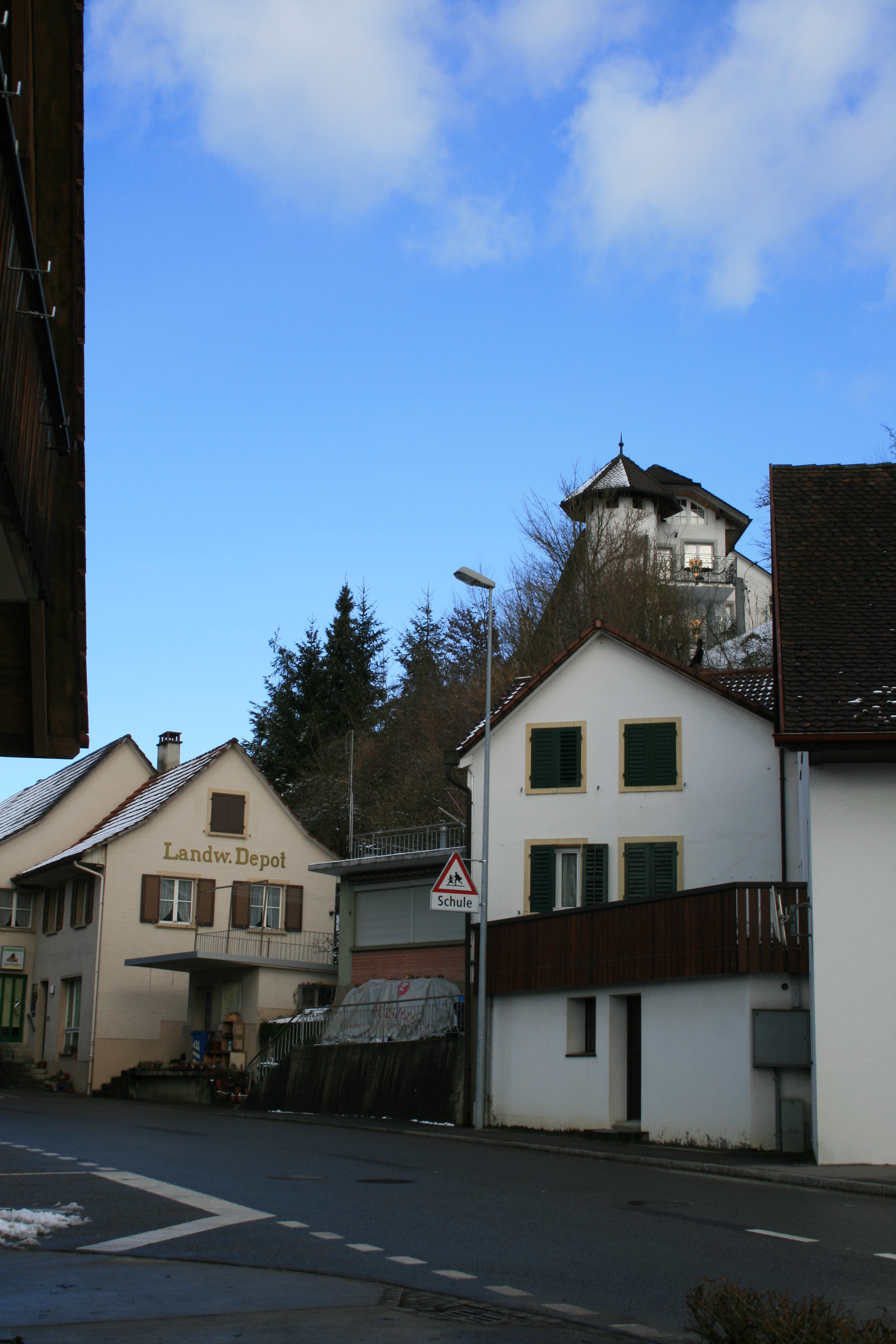

- Flag Coat of arms
- Location of Elfingen
- Location within Switzerland Location within Canton of Aargau
- Coordinates: 47°31′N 8°6′E
- Country: Switzerland
- Canton: Aargau
- District: Laufenberg

Area
  - Total: 4.23 km^{2} (1.63 sq mi)
- Elevation: 457 m (1,499 ft)

Population (December 2020)
  - Total: 298
  - Density: 70.4/km^{2} (182/sq mi)
- Time zone: UTC+01:00 (CET)
  - Summer (DST): UTC+02:00 (CEST)
- Postal code: 5077
- SFOS number: 4097
- ISO 3166 code: CH-AG
- Surrounded by: Bözen, Effingen, Hornussen, Mönthal, Sulz
- Website: elfingen.ch

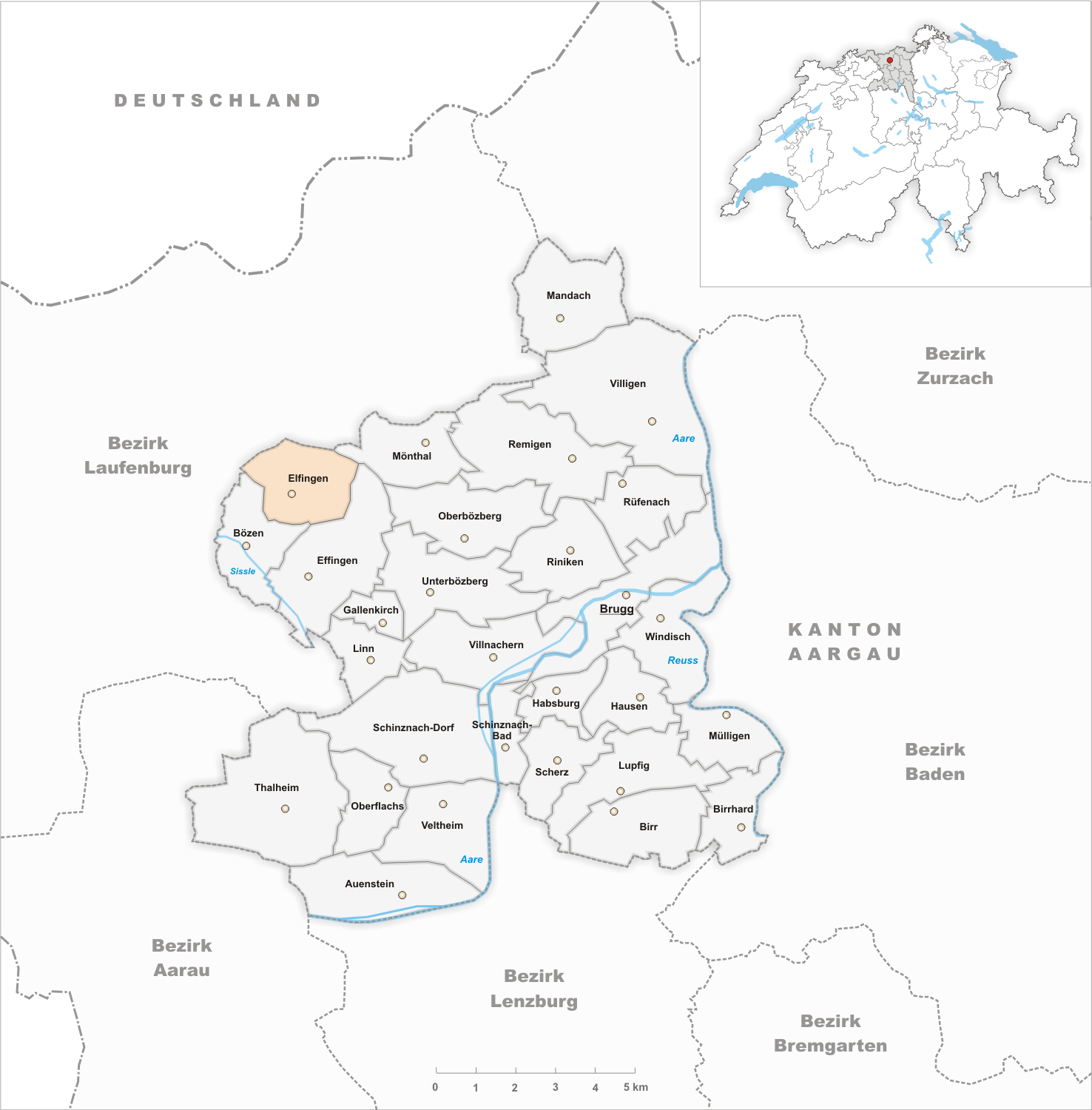
Elfingen

Elfingen is a former municipality in the district of Laufenberg in canton of Aargau in Switzerland. On 1 January 2022 the former municipalities of Bözen, Effingen, Elfingen and Hornussen merged into the new municipality of Böztal.

== History ==
While Alamanni graves have been discovered in the municipality and it was the seat of a fief holder from Murbach Abbey in the 7th Century, Elfingen is first mentioned in 1245 as Eolfingen. When the Abbey sold their holdings in Aargau to the Habsburg in 1291, Elfingen was included. It came under the authority of Bern starting in 1460 and was part of the bailiwick Schenkenberg.

Aerial view from 600 m by Walter Mittelholzer (1925)

The Catholic parish church, was consecrated in 1323 to St. Leodegar. However the parish seat moved in the 16th Century to Bözen. The new parish included Bözen, Effingen, Zeihen (until 1528), Linn (to 1649) and Densbüren (1528–1642). The parsonage remained in Elfingen until 1824, when it moved to Bözen. By 1720 the village had its own school.

Until the 19th century agriculture (especially livestock) dominated the local economy. In the 18th century small-scale home spinning of cotton added to the local economy. In 2000, one quarter of the working population worked in the first sector of the economy.

== Geography ==
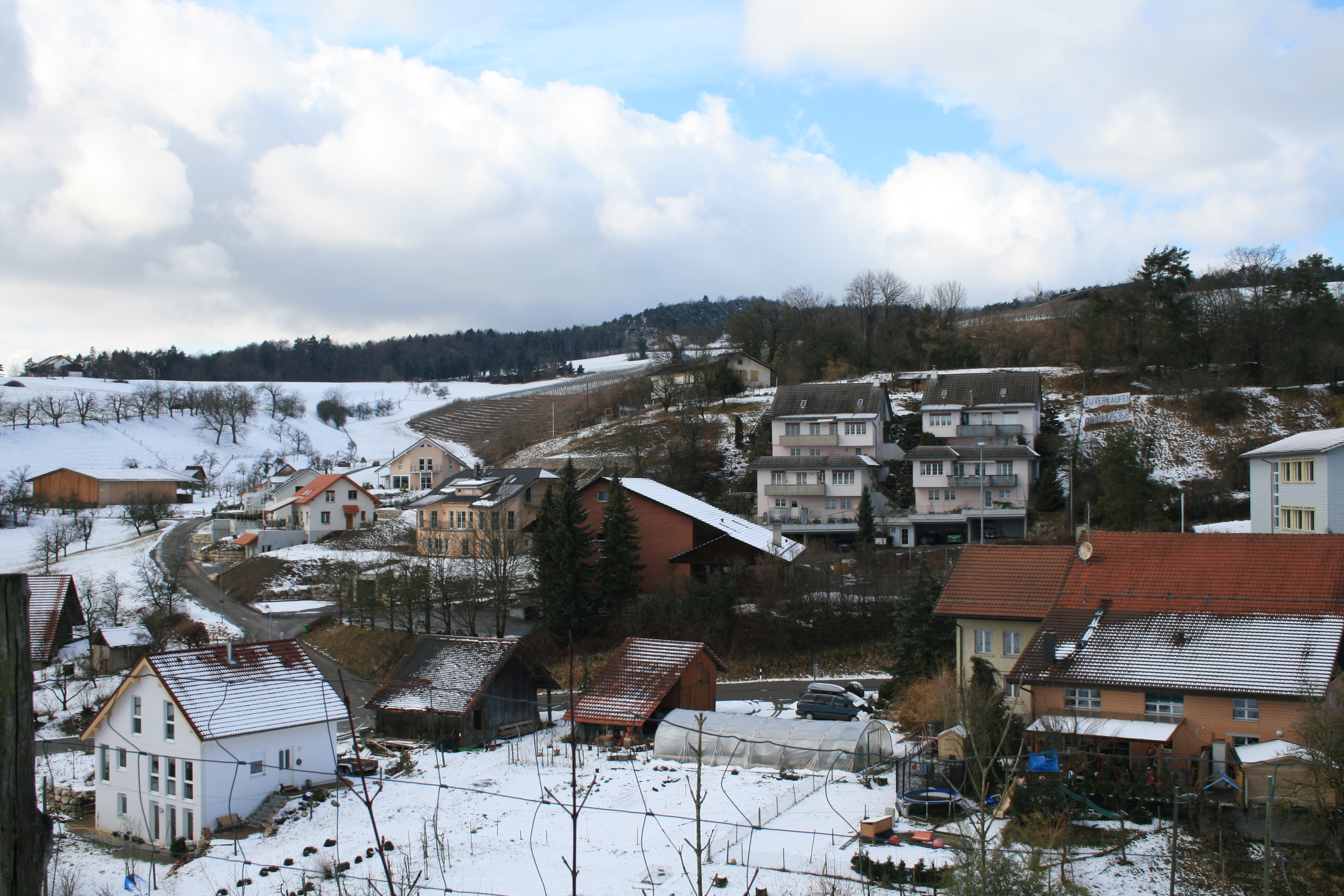
Elfingen village

Elfingen has an area, as of 2006, of 4.23 square kilometers (1.63 sq mi). Of this area, 1.94 square kilometers (0.75 sq mi) or 45.9% is used for agricultural purposes, while2.09 square kilometers (0.81 sq mi) or 49.4% is forested. Of the rest of the land, 0.16 square kilometers (0.062 sq mi) or 3.8% is settled (buildings or roads), 0.02 km^{2} (4.9 acres) or 0.5% is either rivers or lakes.

Of the built up area, housing and buildings made up 0.9% and transportation infrastructure made up 2.8%. Of the agricultural land, 22.7% is used for growing crops and 17.0% is pastures, while 6.1% is used for orchards or vine crops. All the water in the municipality is in rivers and streams.

The municipality is located in the Laufenberg district in a hollow of the Jura plateau. It consists of the village of Elfingen and the hamlets of Bez. Laufenberg. In einer Mulde des Tafeljuras gelegen. The municipalities of Bözen, Effingen, Elfingen, Hornussen and Zeihen are considering a merger some time in the future into a new municipality with an as yet (as of 2010) undetermined name.

== Coat of arms ==
The blazon of the municipal coat of arms is Gules a Patriarchal Cross patte Argent issuant from Coupeaux Vert. The cross is derived from the arms of Hungary, as the village was a possession of the Königsfelden Abbey, which was founded by Queen Agnes of Hungary.

== Demographics ==
Elfingen has a population (as of December 2020) of 298. As of June 2009, 15.3% of the population are foreign nationals. Over the last 10 years (1997–2007) the population has changed at a rate of 11%. Most of the population (as of 2000) speaks German (94.2%), with Portuguese being second most common ( 1.7%) and Serbo-Croatian being third ( 1.3%).

The age distribution, as of 2008, in Elfingen is; 24 children or 9.1% of the population are between 0 and 9 years old and 23 teenagers or 8.7% are between 10 and 19. Of the adult population, 30 people or 11.3% of the population are between 20 and 29 years old. 31 people or 11.7% are between 30 and 39, 60 people or 22.6% are between 40 and 49, and 40 people or 15.1% are between 50 and 59. The senior population distribution is 28 people or 10.6% of the population are between 60 and 69 years old, 6 people or 2.3% are between 70 and 79, there are 17 people or 6.4% who are between 80 and 89, and there are 6 people or 2.3% who are 90 and older.

As of 2000 the average number of residents per living room was 0.52 which is about equal to the cantonal average of 0.57 per room. In this case, a room is defined as space of a housing unit of at least 4 m^{2} (43 sq ft) as normal bedrooms, dining rooms, living rooms, kitchens and habitable cellars and attics.

About 74.4% of the total households were owner occupied, or in other words did not pay rent (though they may have a mortgage or a rent-to-own agreement). As of 2000, there were 5 homes with 1 or 2 persons in the household, 32 homes with 3 or 4 persons in the household, and 53 homes with 5 or more persons in the household. The average number of people per household was 2.52 individuals. In 2008 there were 62 single family homes (or 48.4% of the total) out of a total of 128 homes and apartments. There were a total of 0 empty apartments for a 0.0% vacancy rate. As of 2007, the construction rate of new housing units was 15.3 new units per 1000 residents.

In the 2007 federal election the most popular party was the SVP which received 40.4% of the vote. The next three most popular parties were the SP (18.7%), the Green Party (15.3%) and the CVP (9.8%).

The entire Swiss population is generally well educated. In Elfingen about 74% of the population (between age 25–64) have completed either non-mandatory upper secondary education or additional higher education (either university or a Fachhochschule). Of the school age population (in the 2008/2009 school year), there are 17 students attending primary school in the municipality.

The historical population is given in the following table:

Historical population
Year	Pop.	±%
1764	144	—
1850	265	+84.0%
1900	217	−18.1%
1950	199	−8.3%
1980	165	−17.1%
2000	240	+45.5%

== Sights ==
The village of Elfingen is designated as part of the Inventory of Swiss Heritage Sites.

== Economy ==
As of 2007, Elfingen had an unemployment rate of 0.91%. As of 2005, there were 33 people employed in the primary economic sector and about 12 businesses involved in this sector. 1 person is employed in the secondary sector and there is 1 business in this sector. 36 people are employed in the tertiary sector, with 12 businesses in this sector.

As of 2000 there was a total of 123 workers who lived in the municipality. Of these, 94 or about 76.4% of the residents worked outside Elfingen while 13 people commuted into the municipality for work. There were a total of 42 jobs (of at least 6 hours per week) in the municipality. Of the working population, 15.1% used public transportation to get to work, and 50.8% used a private car.

== Religion ==
From the 2000 census, 51 or 21.3% were Roman Catholic, while 140 or 58.3% belonged to the Swiss Reformed Church.
