= Bözen =

- Former municipality
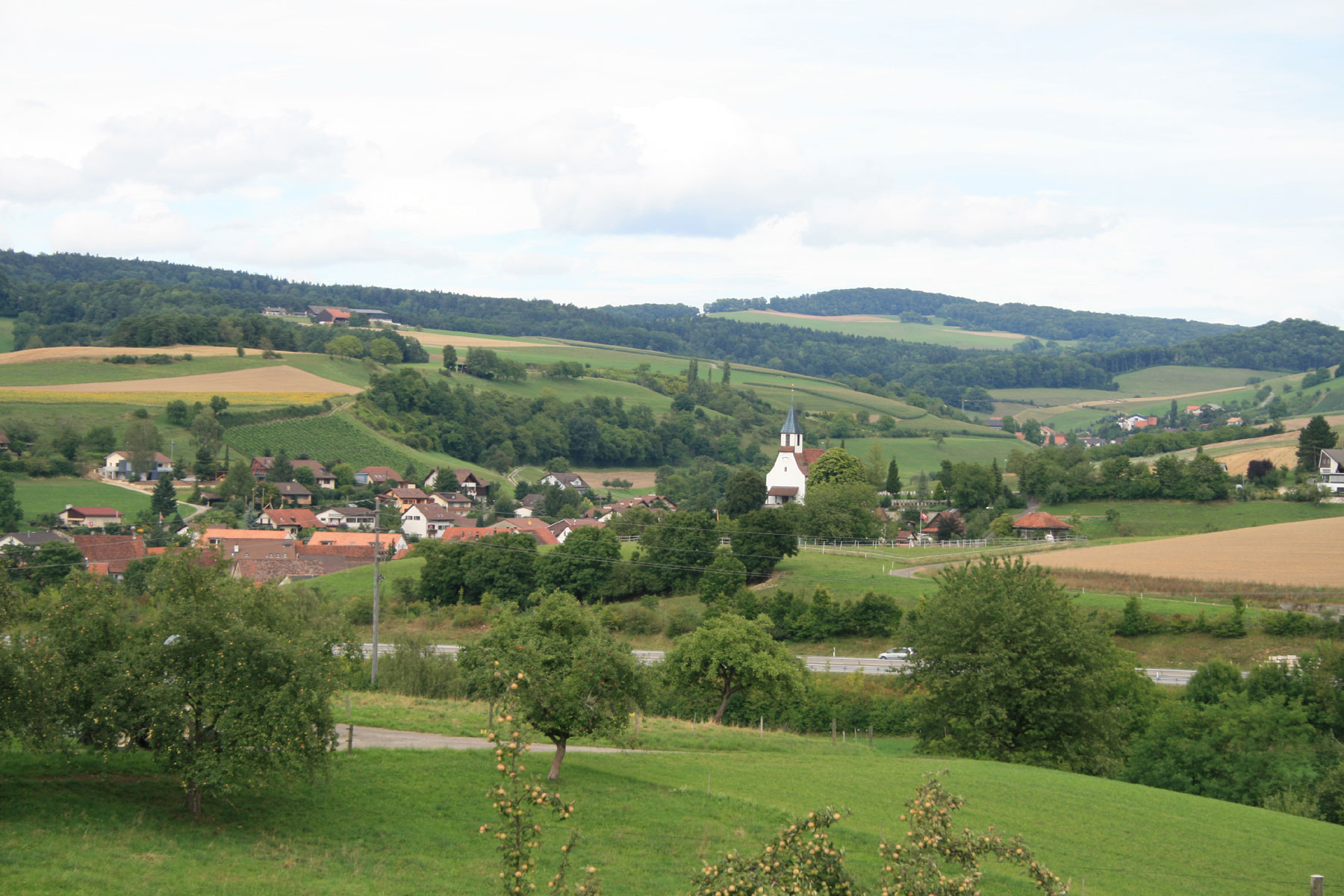
- Bözen village

- Flag Coat of arms
- Location of Bözen
- Location within Switzerland Location within Canton of Aargau
- Coordinates: 47°30′N 8°5′E
- Country: Switzerland
- Canton: Aargau
- District: Brugg

Area
  - Total: 3.95 km^{2} (1.53 sq mi)
- Elevation: 407 m (1,335 ft)

Population (December 2020)
  - Total: 804
  - Density: 204/km^{2} (527/sq mi)
- Time zone: UTC+01:00 (CET)
  - Summer (DST): UTC+02:00 (CEST)
- Postal code: 5076
- SFOS number: 4094
- ISO 3166 code: CH-AG
- Surrounded by: Effingen, Elfingen, Hornussen, Zeihen
- Website: boezen.ch

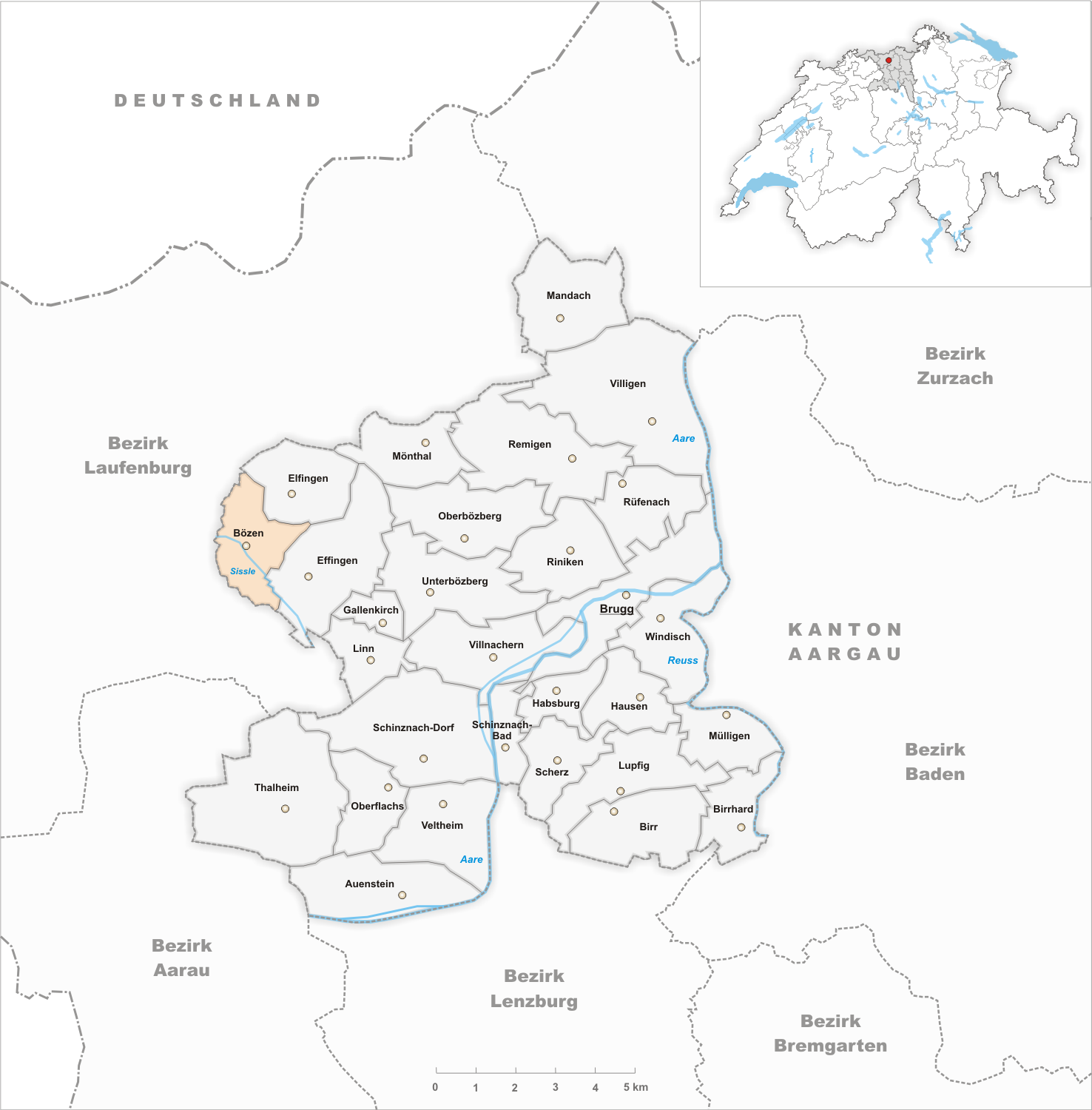
Bözen

Bözen (Swiss German pronunciation: [ˈbøːtsə]) is a village in the Swiss canton of Aargau. It lies to the west of the Bözberg in the upper Frick valley. Until 31 December 2021, Bözen was an independent municipality in the district of Brugg, since then it has been one of four villages in the newly created municipality of Böztal in the district of Laufenburg.

== History ==
The earliest evidence of people in Bözen are a Neolithic stone ax, a Roman Estate and Alamanni graves. Bözen is first mentioned in 1284 as Boze. During the Middle Ages it was owned by Elfingen. Then, in 1291 it was sold, along with most of the Aargau, by Murbach Abbey to the Habsburgs In 1322 it came under the authority of Königsfelden abbey in Windisch. The village was bought by Bern in 1514. Starting in the 16th century, Bözen together with Elfingen and Effingen formed a low justice district.

Aerial view from 500 m by Walter Mittelholzer (1923)

The chapel of Bözen was first mentioned in 1381, and was originally part of the parish of Elfingen. Presumably in 1600 the parish was transferred to Bözen.

Economically the village was dominated by agriculture with a number of vineyards (in the mid-19th Century, some 50 ha). With the construction of the Bözbergtunnel in 1875 the village grew. Between 1840 and 1925, the main industry was home straw production for the straw plaiting industry. Starting in 1980 there was a building boom, and the number of commuters increased thanks to regular bus service to Brugg (starting in 1990).

== Geography ==
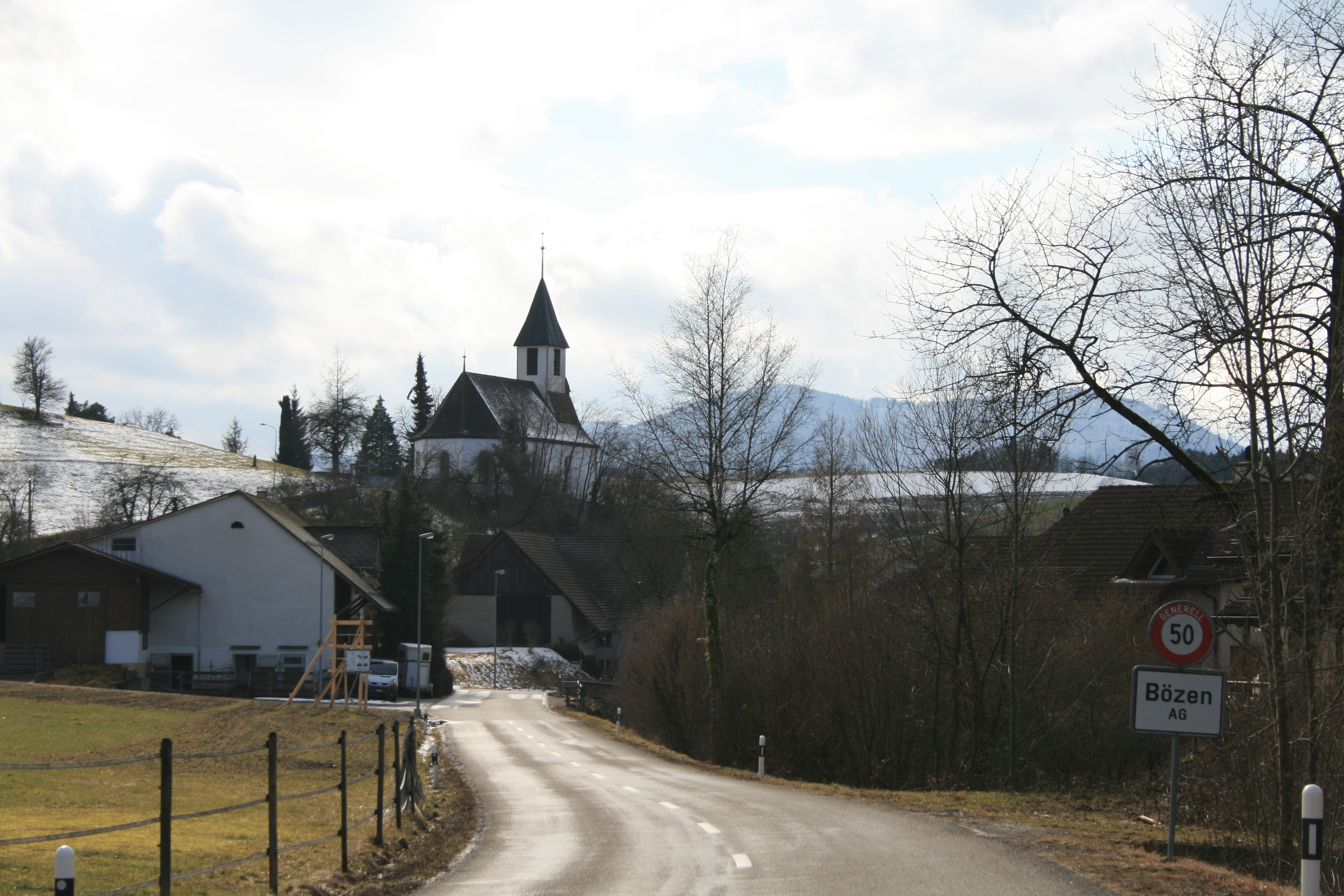
Village church and village of Bözen

Bözen has an area, as of 2006, of 3.95 square kilometers (1.53 sq mi). Of this area, 2.61 square kilometers (1.01 sq mi) or 66.1% is used for agricultural purposes, while 0.86 square kilometers (0.33 sq mi) or 21.8% is forested. Of the rest of the land, 0.44 square kilometers (0.17 sq mi) or 11.1% is settled (buildings or roads) and 0.01 km^{2} (2.5 acres) or 0.3% is unproductive land.

Of the built up area, industrial buildings made up 0.3% of the total area while housing and buildings made up 4.6% and transportation infrastructure made up 6.1%. 19.2% of the total land area was heavily forested and 2.5% is orchards or small clusters of trees. Of the agricultural land, 37.5% is used for growing crops and 22.8% is pastures, while 5.8% is used for orchards or vine crops.

The municipality is located in the Brugg district on the slopes of the Bözberg. It consists of the linear village of Bözen. The municipalities of Bözen, Effingen, Elfingen, Hornussen and Zeihen are considering a merger some time in the future into a new municipality with an as yet (as of 2010) undetermined name.

== Coat of arms ==
The blazon of the municipal coat of arms is Or a Bar Sable.

== Demographics ==
Bözen has a population (as of December 2020) of 804. As of June 2009, 14.7% of the population are foreign nationals. Over the last 10 years (1997–2007) the population has changed at a rate of 0.9%. Most of the population (as of 2000) speaks German (92.8%), with Albanian being second most common (2.0%) and Serbo-Croatian being third (1.8%).

The age distribution, as of 2008, in Bözen is; 56 children or 8.0% of the population are between 0 and 9 years old and 106 teenagers or 15.2% are between 10 and 19. Of the adult population, 109 people or 15.6% of the population are between 20 and 29 years old. Seventy-two people or 10.3% are between 30 and 39, 127 people or 18.2% are between 40 and 49, and 109 people or 15.6% are between 50 and 59. The senior population distribution is 62 people or 8.9% of the population are between 60 and 69 years old, 33 people or 4.7% are between 70 and 79, there are 20 people or 2.9% who are between 80 and 89, and there are 4 people or 0.6% who are 90 and older.

As of 2000 the average number of residents per living room was 0.61 which is about equal to the cantonal average of 0.57 per room. In this case, a room is defined as space of a housing unit of at least 4 m^{2} (43 sq ft) as normal bedrooms, dining rooms, living rooms, kitchens and habitable cellars and attics.

About 62.4% of the total households were owner occupied, or in other words did not pay rent (though they may have a mortgage or a rent-to-own agreement). As of 2000, there were 28 homes with 1 or 2 persons in the household, 83 homes with 3 or 4 persons in the household, and 118 homes with 5 or more persons in the household. The average number of people per household was 2.76 individuals. In 2008 there were 114 single family homes (or 40.6% of the total) out of a total of 281 homes and apartments. There were a total of 0 empty apartments for a 0.0% vacancy rate. As of 2007, the construction rate of new housing units was 4.6 new units per 1000 residents.

In the 2007 federal election the most popular party was the SVP which received 60.8% of the vote. The next three most popular parties were the SP (11.5%), the CVP (6.9%) and the FDP (6.4%).

The entire Swiss population is generally well educated. In Bözen about 78% of the population (between age 25–64) have completed either non-mandatory upper secondary education or additional higher education (either university or a Fachhochschule). Of the school age population (in the 2008/2009 school year), there are 53 students attending primary school, there are 54 students attending secondary school in the municipality.

The historical population is given in the following table:

Historical population
Year	Pop.	±%
1764	361	—
1850	539	+49.3%
1900	376	−30.2%
1941	347	−7.7%
1950	383	+10.4%
1980	372	−2.9%
2000	657	+76.6%

== Economy ==
As of 2007, Bözen had an unemployment rate of 2.17%. As of 2005, there were 42 people employed in the primary economic sector and about 14 businesses involved in this sector. Thirty-two people are employed in the secondary sector and there are 9 businesses in this sector. Ninety-six people are employed in the tertiary sector, with 17 businesses in this sector.

As of 2000 there were 334 residents who worked in the municipality, while 253 residents worked outside Bözen and 73 people commuted into the municipality for work. Of the working population, 13.3% used public transportation to get to work, and 51.6% used a private car.

== Religion ==
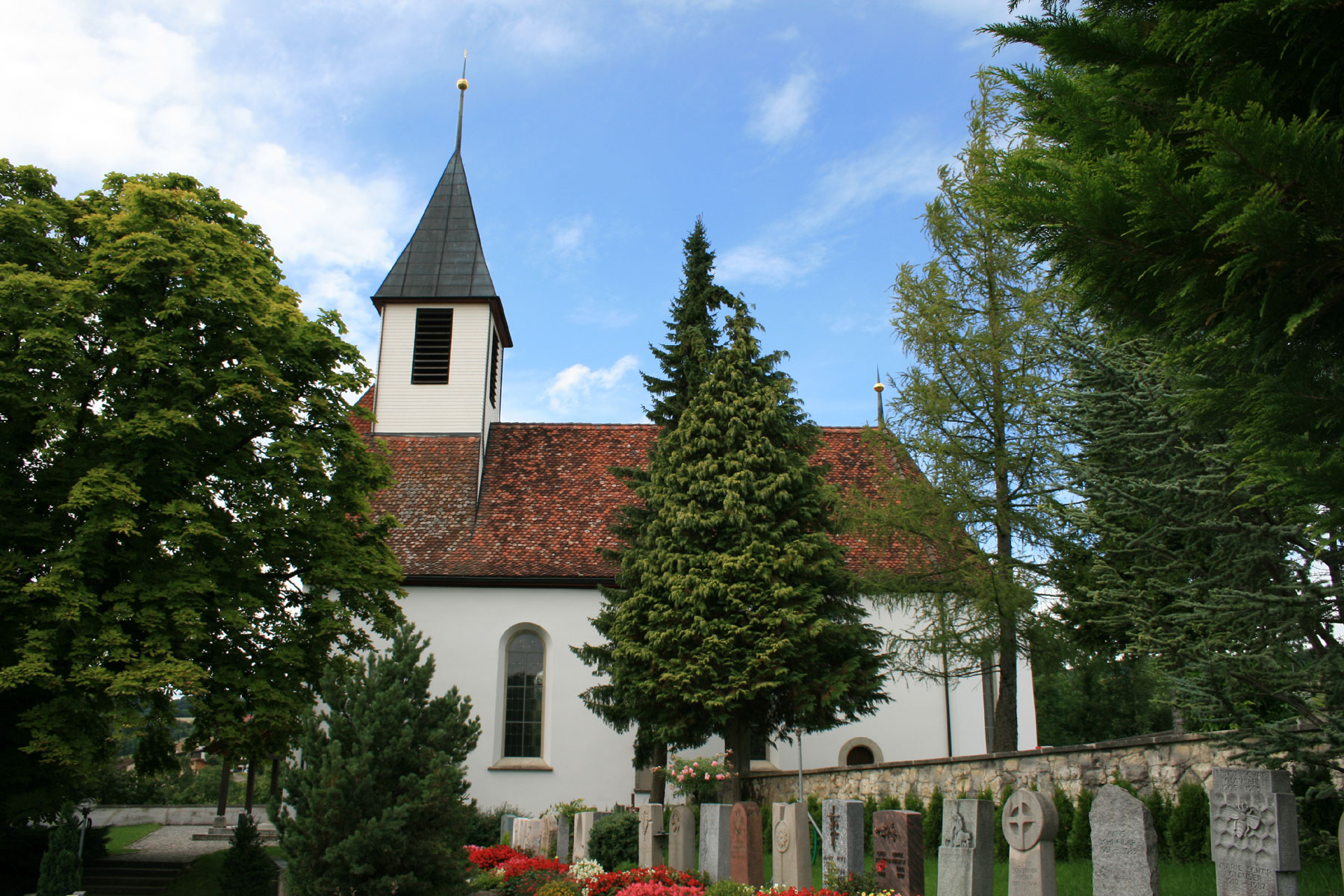
Village church

From the 2000 census, 137 or 20.9% were Roman Catholic, while 383 or 58.3% belonged to the Swiss Reformed Church. Of the rest of the population, there were 2 individuals (or about 0.30% of the population) who belonged to the Christian Catholic faith.
