= Kerenzerberg Rail Tunnel =

Railway tunnel in Glarus, Switzerland

Coordinates: 47°07′30″N 9°06′59″E

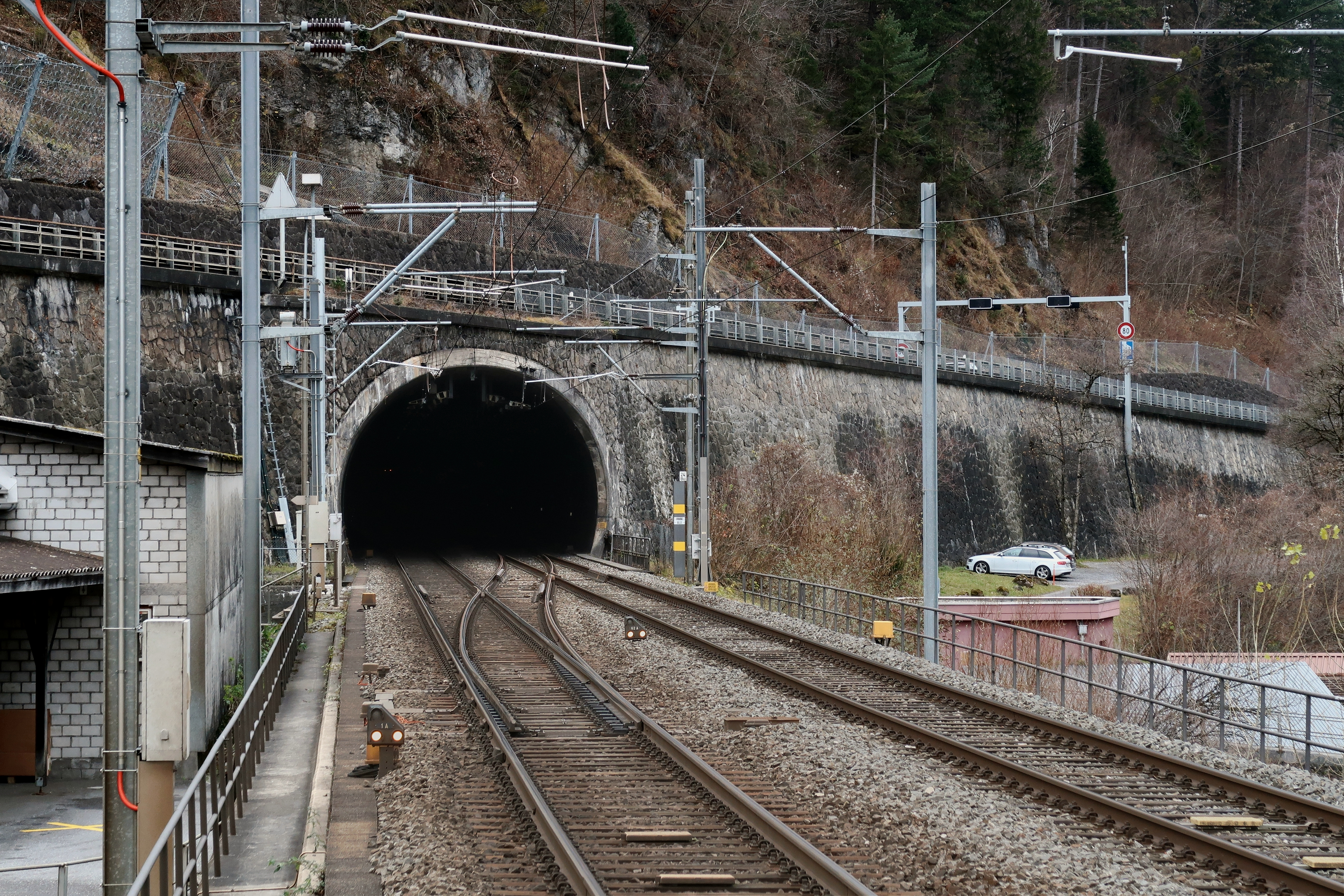
Eastern portal

The Kerenzerberg Rail Tunnel is a rail tunnel in the Swiss canton of Glarus. The tunnel is 3,955 metres (12,976 ft) long, and carries the Ziegelbrücke to Sargans line under the Kerenzerberg Pass to the south of the Walensee.

Prior to 1960, the railway used a route along the shores of the Walensee and through shorter tunnels. The trackbed of this route is now used by the westbound carriageway of the A3 motorway, with the eastbound carriageway using the Kerenzerberg Road Tunnel that runs roughly parallel to the rail tunnel.
