= Kerenzerberg Road Tunnel =

Road tunnel in Switzerland

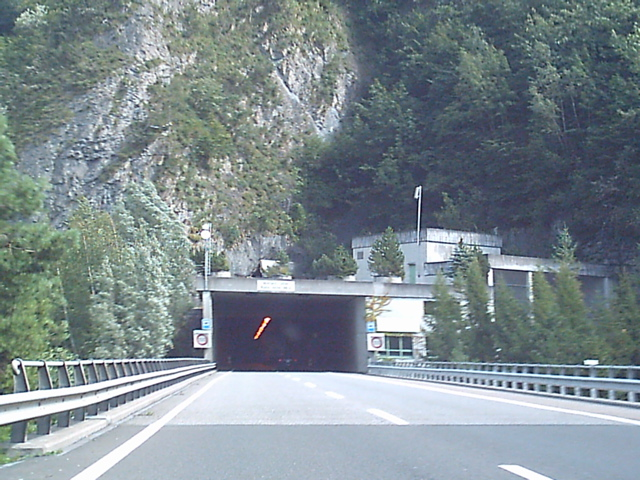
- Interactive map of Kerenzerberg Road Tunnel

Overview
- Location: Canton Glarus, Switzerland
- Coordinates: 47°07′30″N 9°06′59″E
- Status: Active
- Route: A3 motorway

Operation
- Character: road

Technical
- Length: 5,760 metres (18,900 ft)
- No. of lanes: 2

The Kerenzerberg Tunnel is a motorway tunnel in Switzerland, and forms part of the A3 motorway from Basel and Zürich to Sargans. The tunnel is 5,760 metres (18,900 ft) long and lies south-west of Lake Walen, under the Kerenzerberg Pass.

The Kerenzerberg Tunnel is a one-way, unidirectional tunnel. Traffic from Zürich to Sargans must pass through the tunnel, whilst traffic in the opposite direction runs along the shores of the Walensee through six short tunnels originally built for a railway. The railway now runs through the 4 km (2.5 mi) long Kerenzerberg Rail Tunnel, which is roughly parallel to the road tunnel.

Transportation of dangerous goods through the Kerenzerberg tunnel is prohibited.
