= Bözberg Road Tunnel =

Motorway tunnel in Switzerland

- Interactive map of Bözberg Road Tunnel

Overview
- Location: Aargau, Switzerland
- Coordinates: 47°28′10″N 8°7′15″E
- Status: Active
- Route: A3 motorway

Operation
- Opened: 1996
- Character: road

Technical
- Length: 3,705 metres (12,156 ft)

The Bözberg Road Tunnel is a motorway tunnel in Switzerland. The tunnel lies under the Bözberg Pass between Frick and Baden, in the canton of Aargau, and forms part of the A3 motorway from Basel to Sargans. It is 3,705 metres (12,156 ft) long, and was opened in 1996.

The tunnel runs roughly parallel to the Bözberg Rail Tunnel.
