= Zeihen =

- Municipality
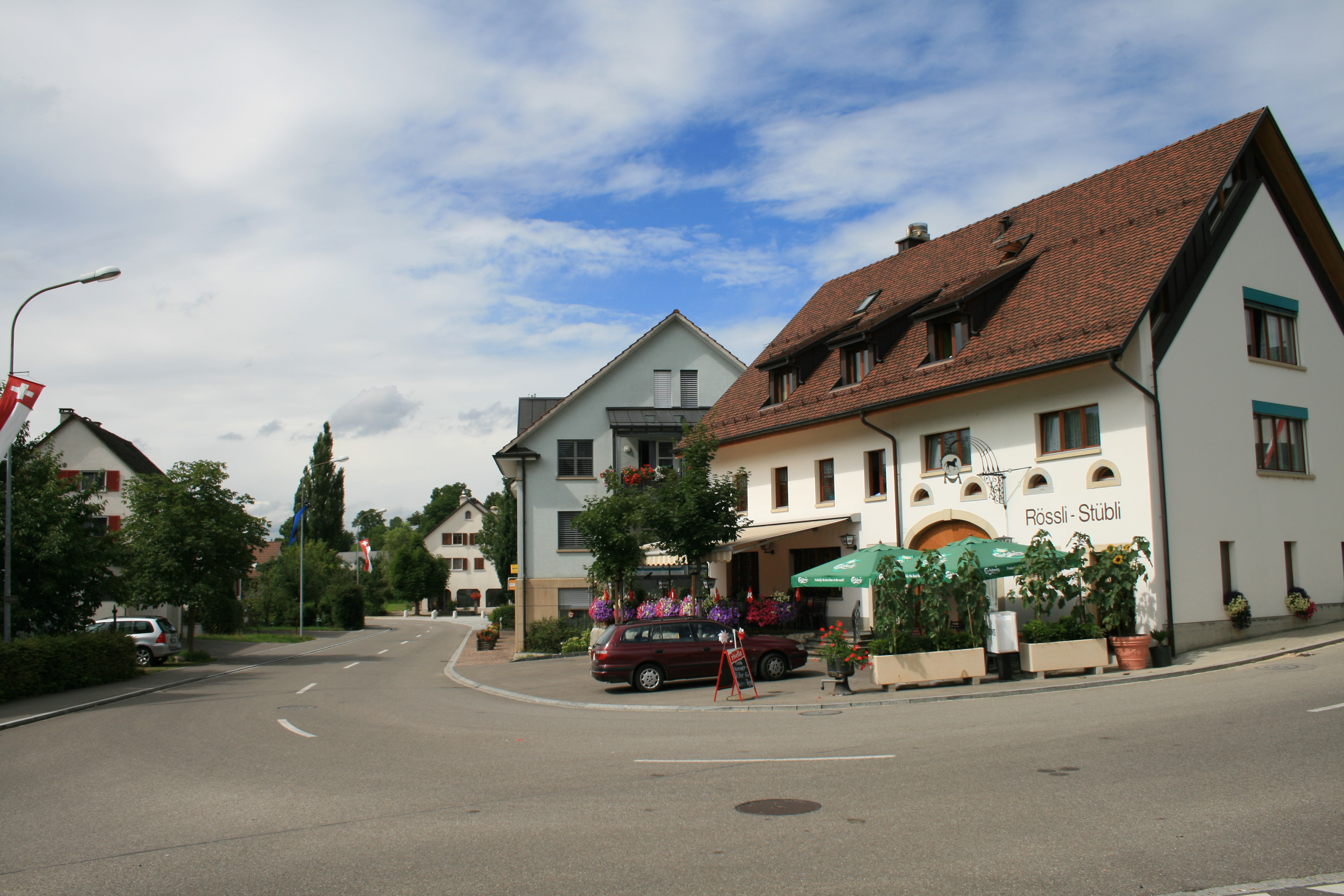

- Flag Coat of arms
- Location of Zeihen
- Location within Switzerland Location within Canton of Aargau
- Coordinates: 47°29′N 8°5′E
- Country: Switzerland
- Canton: Aargau
- District: Laufenburg

Area
  - Total: 6.87 km^{2} (2.65 sq mi)
- Elevation: 445 m (1,460 ft)

Population (December 2006)
  - Total: 909
  - Density: 132/km^{2} (343/sq mi)
- Time zone: UTC+01:00 (CET)
  - Summer (DST): UTC+02:00 (CEST)
- Postal code: 5079
- SFOS number: 4183
- ISO 3166 code: CH-AG
- Surrounded by: Bözen, Densbüren, Effingen, Herznach, Hornussen, Linn, Schinznach-Dorf, Thalheim, Ueken
- Website: www.zeihen.ch

Zeihen (German pronunciation: [ˈtsaɪən]) is a municipality in the district of Laufenburg in the canton of Aargau in Switzerland.

== Geography ==
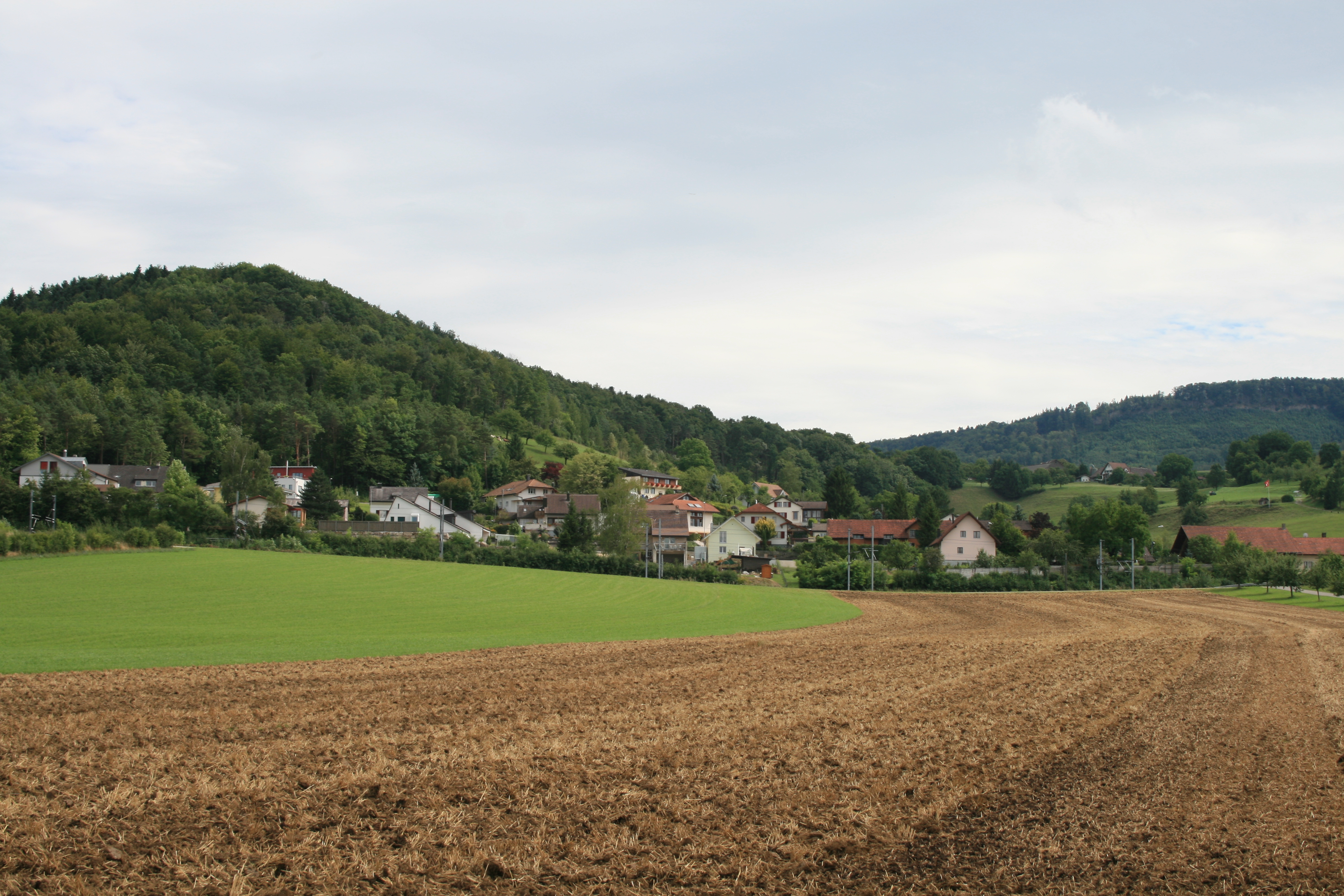
Ziehen

Zeihen has an area, as of 2009, of 6.88 square kilometers (2.66 sq mi). Of this area, 3.5 km^{2} (1.4 sq mi) or 50.9% is used for agricultural purposes, while 2.8 km^{2} (1.1 sq mi) or 40.7% is forested. Of the rest of the land, 0.59 km^{2} (0.23 sq mi) or 8.6% is settled (buildings or roads), 0.01 km^{2} (2.5 acres) or 0.1% is either rivers or lakes and 0.01 km^{2} (2.5 acres) or 0.1% is unproductive land.

Of the built up area, housing and buildings made up 4.7% and transportation infrastructure made up 3.5%. Out of the forested land, 37.5% of the total land area is heavily forested and 3.2% is covered with orchards or small clusters of trees. Of the agricultural land, 23.5% is used for growing crops and 24.4% is pastures, while 2.9% is used for orchards or vine crops. All the water in the municipality is in rivers and streams.

The municipalities of Bözen, Effingen, Elfingen, Hornussen and Zeihen are considering a merger some time in the future into a new municipality with an as yet (as of 2010) undetermined name.

== Coat of arms ==
The blazon of the municipal coat of arms is Vert a Pale counter-compony Sable and Or between two Ears of Wheat of the last.

== Demographics ==
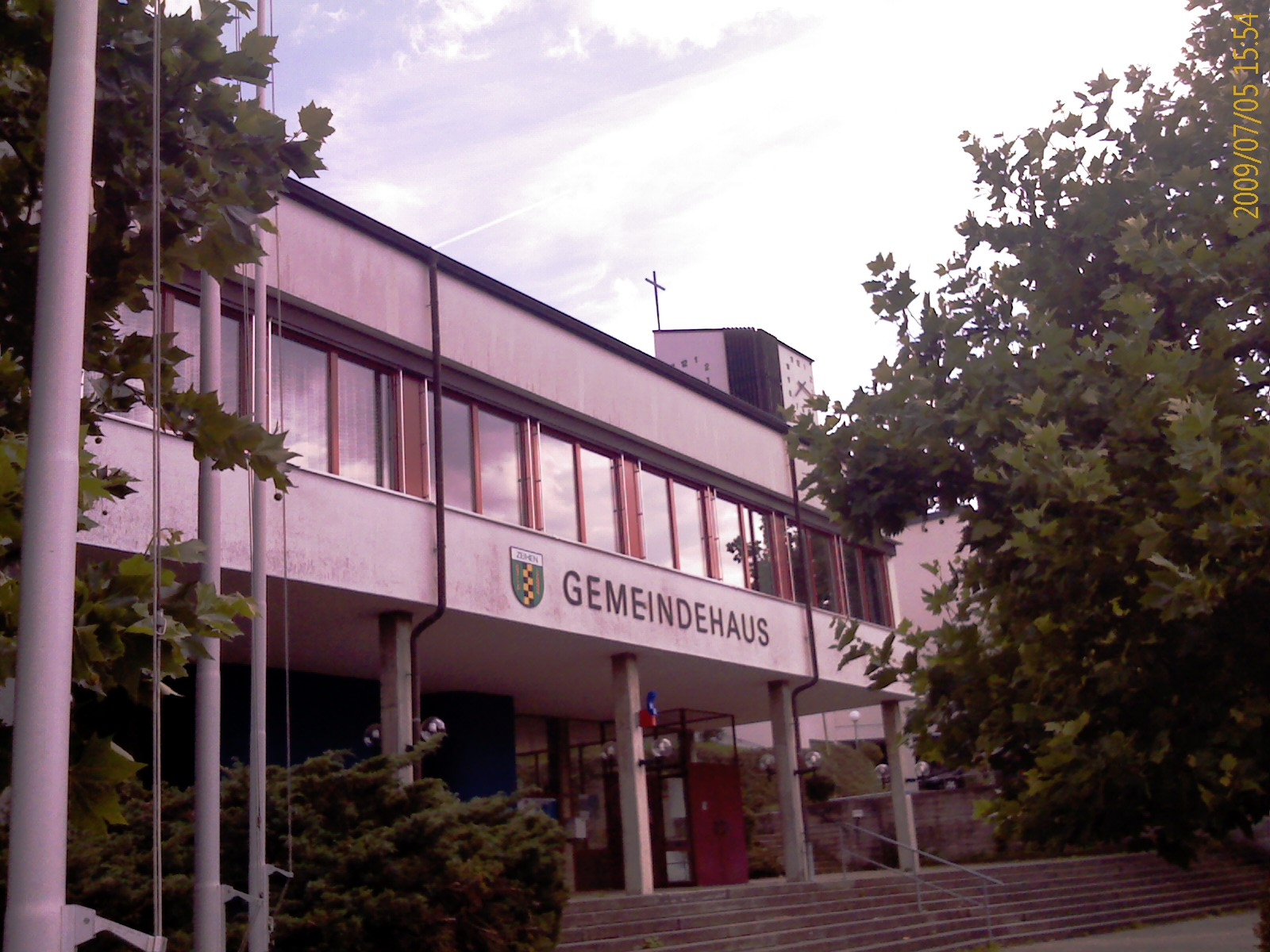
Zeihen municipal building

Aerial view (1953)

Zeihen has a population (as of December 2020) of 1,170. As of June 2009, 8.5% of the population are foreign nationals. Over the last 10 years (1997–2007) the population has changed at a rate of 12.8%. Most of the population (as of 2000) speaks German (92.6%), with Albanian being second most common ( 4.6%) and Serbo-Croatian being third ( 0.8%).

The age distribution, as of 2008, in Zeihen is; 99 children or 10.3% of the population are between 0 and 9 years old and 164 teenagers or 17.0% are between 10 and 19. Of the adult population, 82 people or 8.5% of the population are between 20 and 29 years old. 114 people or 11.8% are between 30 and 39, 205 people or 21.2% are between 40 and 49, and 130 people or 13.5% are between 50 and 59. The senior population distribution is 90 people or 9.3% of the population are between 60 and 69 years old, 44 people or 4.6% are between 70 and 79, there are 34 people or 3.5% who are between 80 and 89, and there are 3 people or 0.3% who are 90 and older.

As of 2000, there were 36 homes with 1 or 2 persons in the household, 111 homes with 3 or 4 persons in the household, and 148 homes with 5 or more persons in the household. As of 2000, there were 301 private households (homes and apartments) in the municipality, and an average of 2.8 persons per household. In 2008 there were 205 single family homes (or 52.8% of the total) out of a total of 388 homes and apartments. There were a total of 0 empty apartments for a 0.0% vacancy rate. As of 2007, the construction rate of new housing units was 9.5 new units per 1000 residents.

In the 2007 federal election the most popular party was the SVP which received 44.3% of the vote. The next three most popular parties were the CVP (17.5%), the Green Party (10.3%) and the SP (10.1%).

In Zeihen about 76% of the population (between age 25-64) have completed either non-mandatory upper secondary education or additional higher education (either university or a Fachhochschule). Of the school age population (in the 2008/2009 school year), there are 73 students attending primary school, there are 47 students attending secondary school in the municipality.

The historical population is given in the following table:

Historical population
Year	Pop.	±%
1975	743	—
1980	726	−2.3%
1990	722	−0.6%
2000	865	+19.8%

== Sights ==
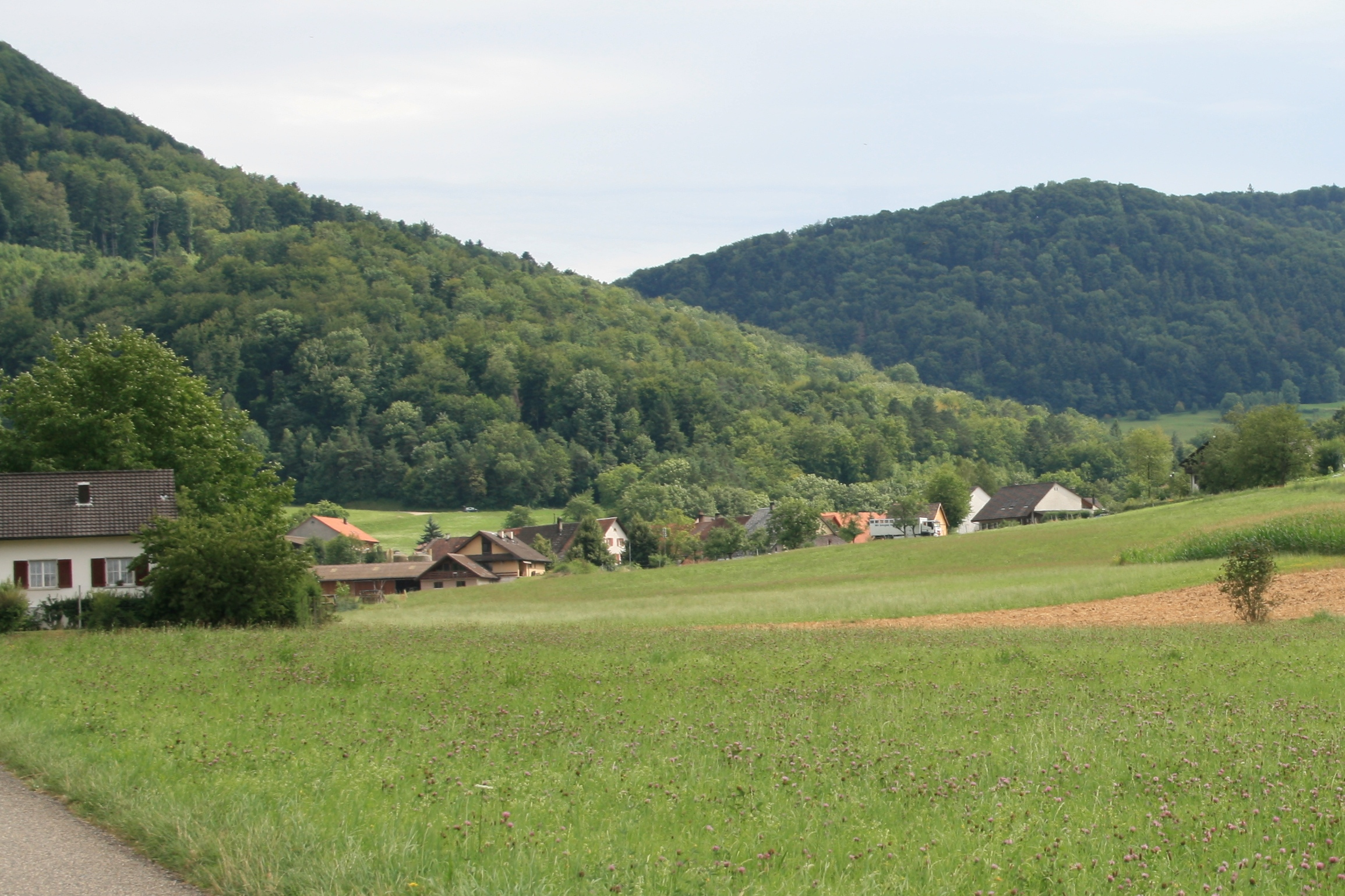
Oberzeihen village

The village of Oberzeihen is designated as part of the Inventory of Swiss Heritage Sites.

== Economy ==
As of 2007, Zeihen had an unemployment rate of 1.9%. As of 2005, there were 70 people employed in the primary economic sector and about 24 businesses involved in this sector. 44 people are employed in the secondary sector and there are 8 businesses in this sector. 94 people are employed in the tertiary sector, with 30 businesses in this sector.

In 2000 there were 427 workers who lived in the municipality. Of these, 312 or about 73.1% of the residents worked outside Zeihen while 63 people commuted into the municipality for work. There were a total of 178 jobs (of at least 6 hours per week) in the municipality. Of the working population, 16.7% used public transportation to get to work, and 57.7% used a private car.

== Religion ==
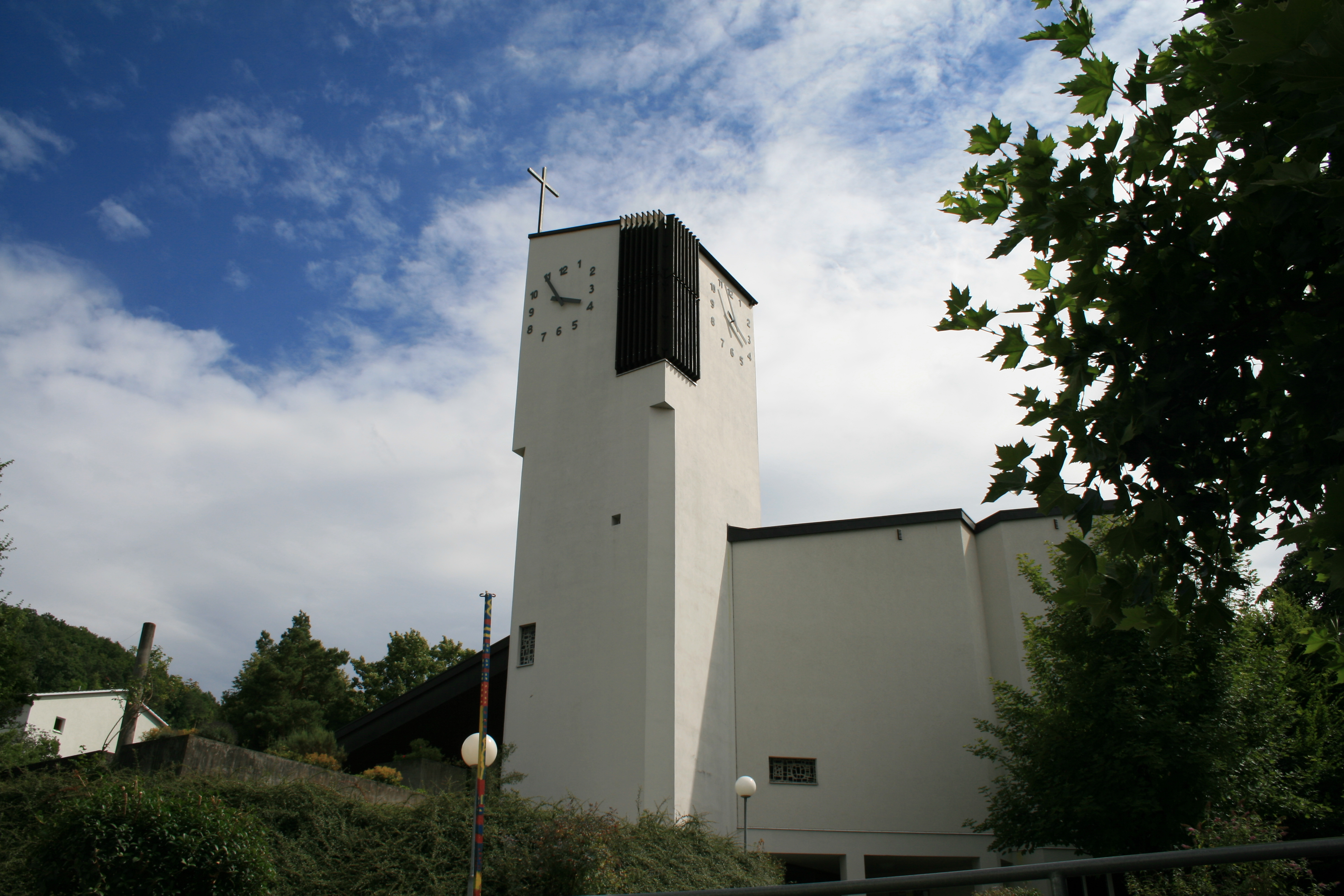
Zeihen church

From the 2000 census, 539 or 62.5% were Roman Catholic, while 175 or 20.3% belonged to the Swiss Reformed Church. Of the rest of the population, there was 1 individual who belonged to the Christian Catholic faith.
