= Effingen =

- Former municipality
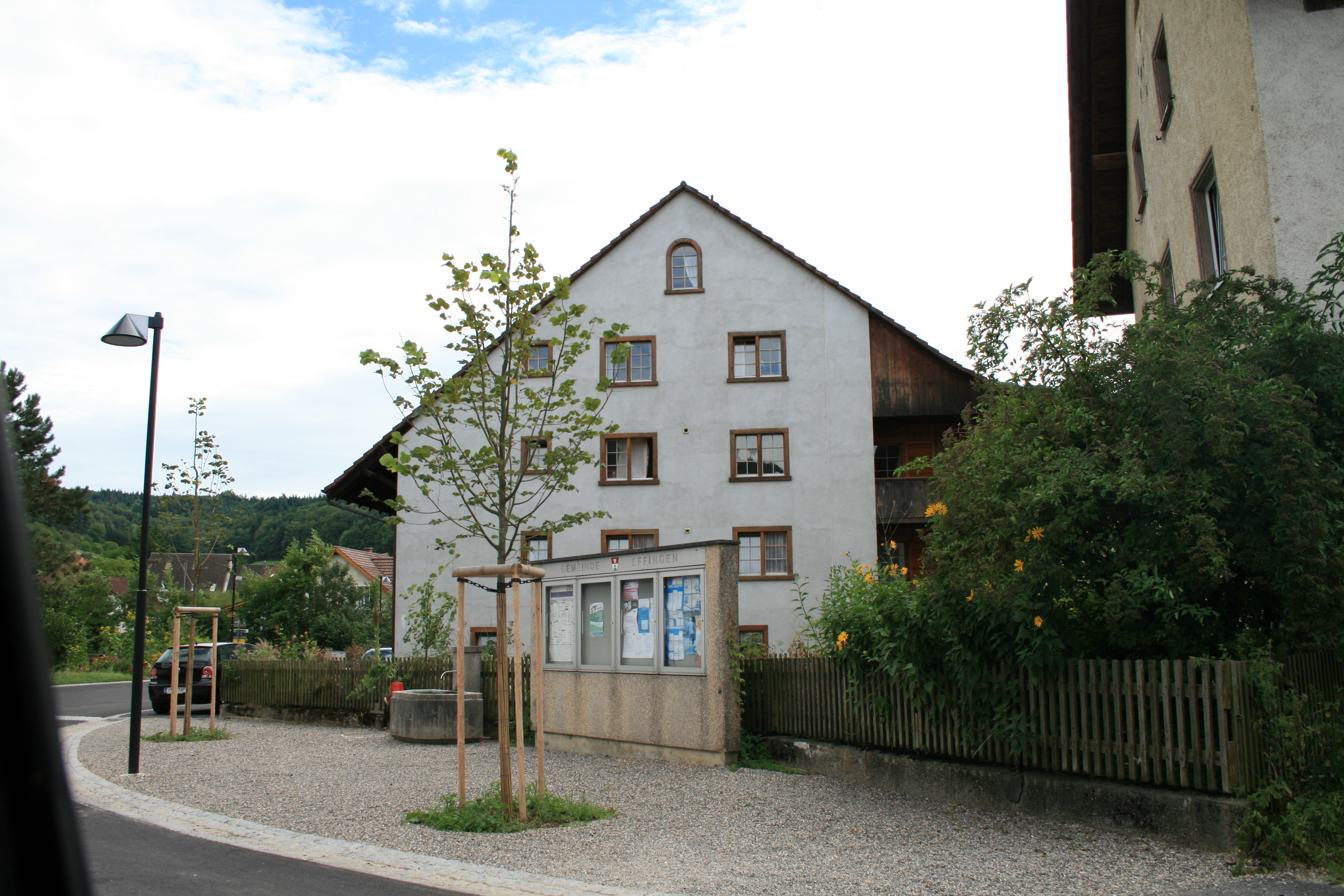

- Flag Coat of arms
- Location of Effingen
- Location within Switzerland Location within Canton of Aargau
- Coordinates: 47°30′N 8°6′E
- Country: Switzerland
- Canton: Aargau
- District: Brugg

Area
  - Total: 6.85 km^{2} (2.64 sq mi)
- Elevation: 432 m (1,417 ft)

Population (December 2020)
  - Total: 632
  - Density: 92.3/km^{2} (239/sq mi)
- Time zone: UTC+01:00 (CET)
  - Summer (DST): UTC+02:00 (CEST)
- Postal code: 5078
- SFOS number: 4096
- ISO 3166 code: CH-AG
- Surrounded by: Bözen, Elfingen, Gallenkirch, Linn, Mönthal, Oberbözberg, Unterbözberg, Zeihen
- Website: effingen.ch

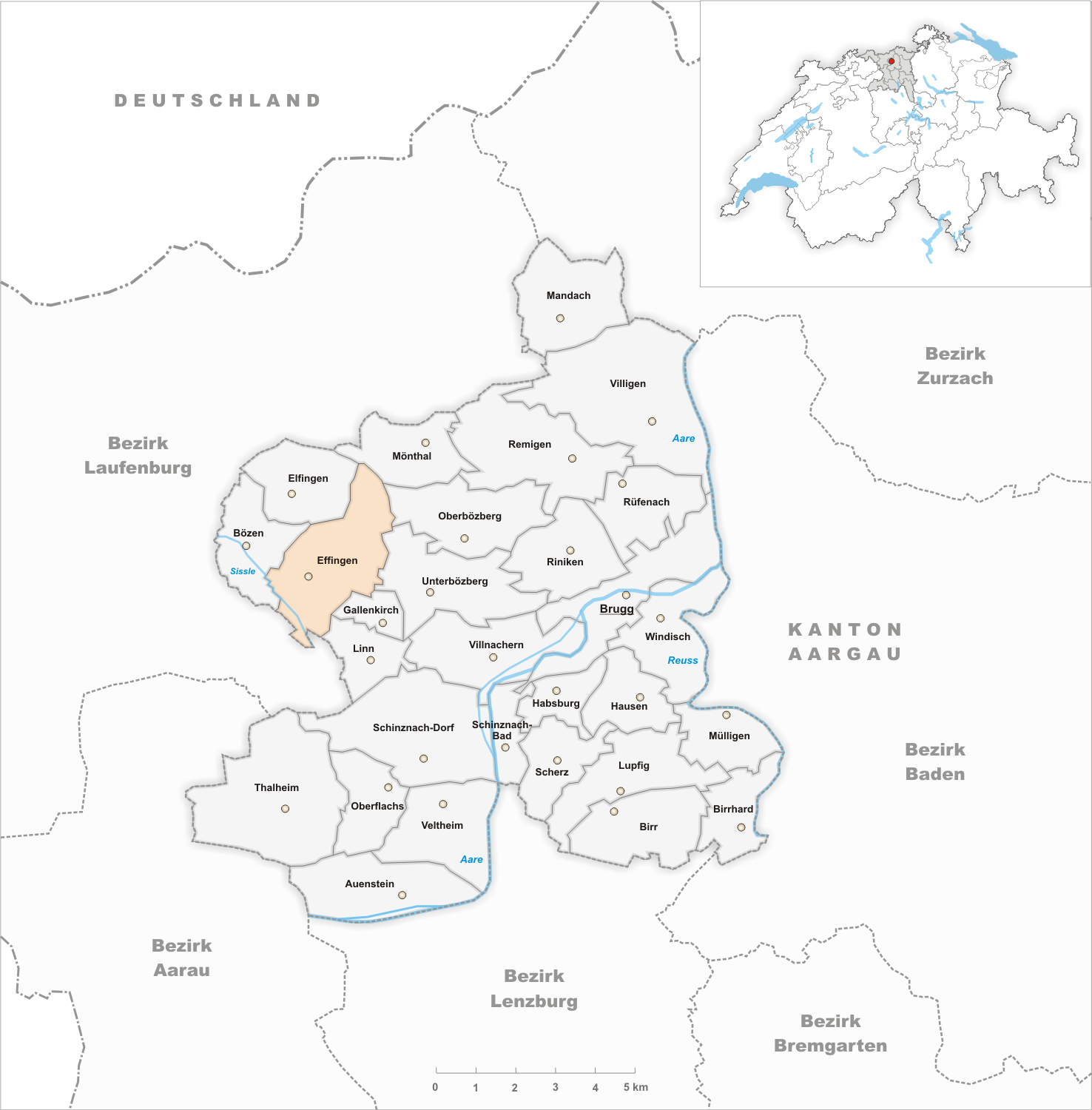
Effingen

Effingen is a former municipality in the district of Brugg in canton of Aargau in Switzerland. On 1 January 2022 the former municipalities of Bözen, Effingen, Elfingen and Hornussen merged into the new municipality of Böztal.

Aerial view (1953)

== History ==
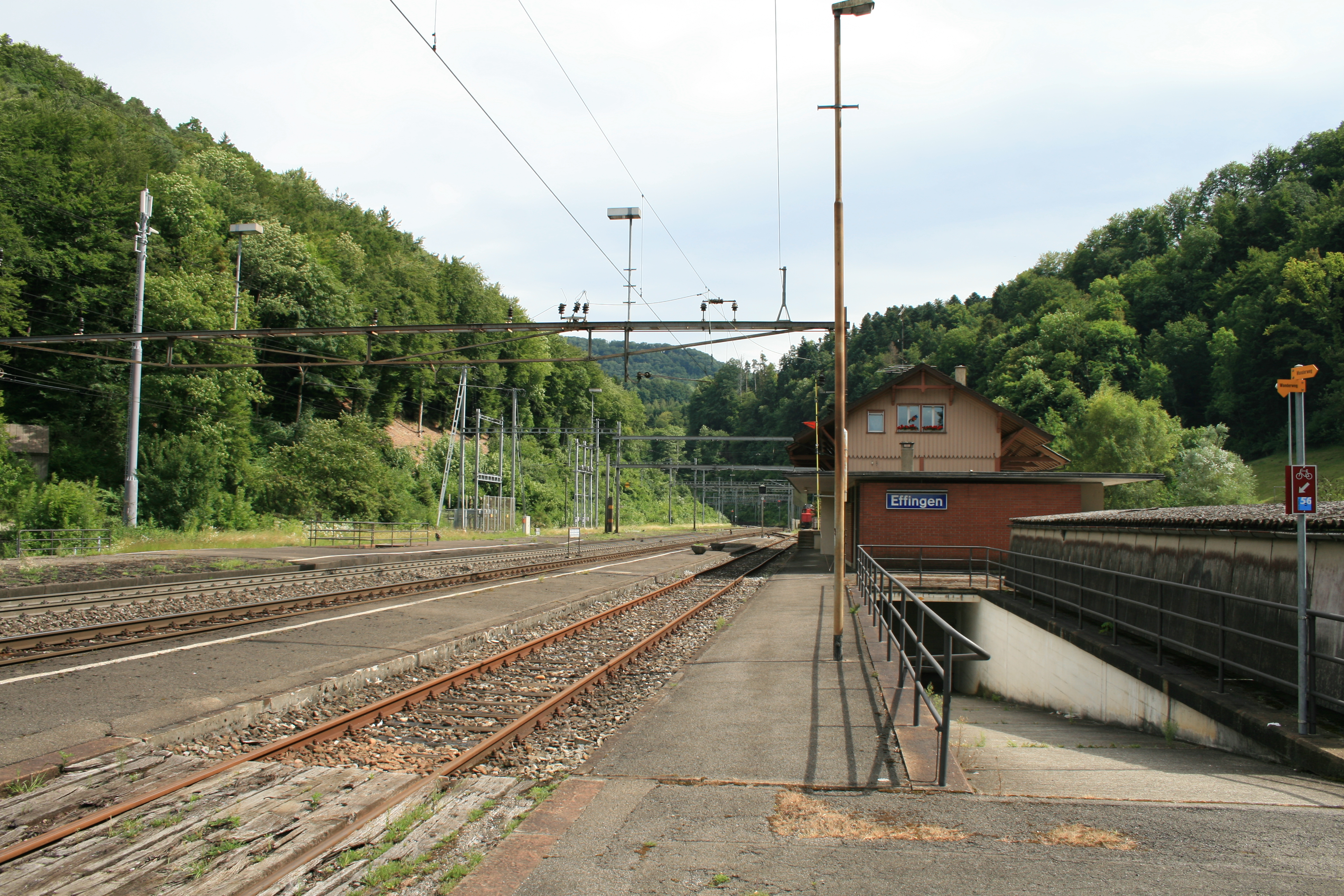
Effingen train station

Effingen is first mentioned in 1284 as Efingen though the area was settled earlier. The earliest evidence of a settlement is a High Middle Ages chapel with associated Alamanni graves.

Effingen belonged to the court of Elfingen until 1460 when it was purchased by Bern. Under Bern it belonged to the court of Bözen of the Schenkenberg Bailiwick. By 1550 the village administrative rights were limited and in 1614 village officials were first mentioned.

Effingen's chapel belonged to the parish of Elfingen and after 1600 to the parish of Bözen. By no later than 1684 there was a village school.

Until the 19th century agriculture prevailed with wine being the most important product. In the 18th century home processing of cotton brought another industry to the village. The village has had a tavern since the 13th century, which provided a stopping point for traffic over the Bözberg and another source of income.

In 1777-79 a new road was built, which increased the traffic into the village. Then, in 1875, a railroad station was built in Effingen. In 1996, the A3 motorway was built near Effingen. Since about 1980 the village has been expanding with new construction. By 2000, the third sector of the economy accounted for about two thirds of jobs in Effingen.

== Geography ==
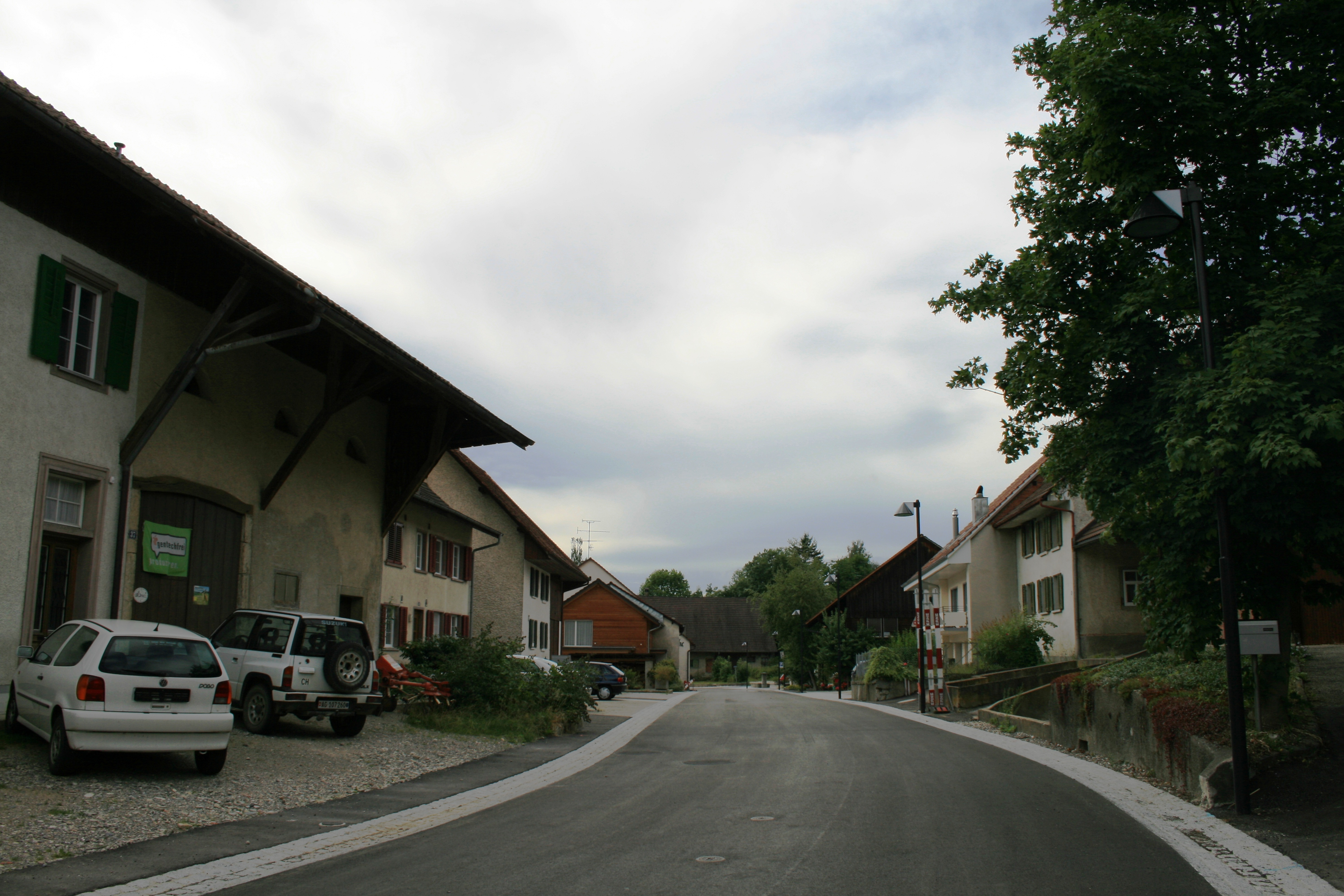
Effingen

Effingen has an area, as of 2006, of 6.85 square kilometers (2.64 sq mi). Of this area, 2.98 square kilometers (1.15 sq mi) or 43.5% is used for agricultural purposes, while3.23 square kilometers (1.25 sq mi) or 47.2% is forested. Of the rest of the land, 0.58 square kilometers (0.22 sq mi) or 8.5% is settled (buildings or roads), 0.05 km^{2} (12 acres) or 0.7% is either rivers or lakes and 0.03 km^{2} (7.4 acres) or 0.4% is unproductive land.

Of the built up area, housing and buildings made up 3.6% and transportation infrastructure made up 4.8%. 46.0% of the total land area is heavily forested and 1.2% is covered with orchards or small clusters of trees. Of the agricultural land, 21.5% is used for growing crops and 20.4% is pastures, while 1.6% is used for orchards or vine crops. All the water in the municipality is in rivers and streams.

The municipality is located in the Brugg district on the western flank of the Bözberg. It consists of the linear village of Effingen and the hamlet of Chästel as well as scattered individual farm houses.

The municipalities of Bözen, Effingen, Elfingen, Hornussen and Zeihen are considering a merger some time in the future into a new municipality with an as yet (as of 2010) undetermined name.

=== Distance from Major Municipalities ===
Effingen is a small municipality, yet is near some of Switzerland's major cities.

- Effingen to Zürich: 35.27 kilometers (21.92 mi)
- Effingen to Lucerne: 51.63 kilometers (32.08 mi)
- Effingen to Bern: 78.03 kilometers (48.49 mi)

== Coat of arms ==
The blazon of the municipal coat of arms is Per fess Gules a Wing Argent and Argent a Mullet of Five Gules and Coupeaux Vert.

== Demographics ==
Effingen has a population (as of December 2020) of 632 As of June 2009, 9.4% of the population are foreign nationals. Over the last 10 years (1997–2007) the population has changed at a rate of -0.6%. Most of the population (as of 2000) speaks German (93.0%), with Albanian being second most common ( 1.4%) and English being third ( 0.9%).

The age distribution, as of 2008, in Effingen is; 44 children or 7.2% of the population are between 0 and 9 years old and 91 teenagers or 14.9% are between 10 and 19. Of the adult population, 89 people or 14.5% of the population are between 20 and 29 years old. 57 people or 9.3% are between 30 and 39, 106 people or 17.3% are between 40 and 49, and 114 people or 18.6% are between 50 and 59. The senior population distribution is 59 people or 9.6% of the population are between 60 and 69 years old, 37 people or 6.0% are between 70 and 79, there are 13 people or 2.1% who are between 80 and 89, and there are 2 people or 0.3% who are 90 and older.

As of 2000 the average number of residents per living room was 0.61 which is about equal to the cantonal average of 0.57 per room. In this case, a room is defined as space of a housing unit of at least 4 m^{2} (43 sq ft) as normal bedrooms, dining rooms, living rooms, kitchens and habitable cellars and attics.

About 66.4% of the total households were owner occupied, or in other words did not pay rent (though they may have a mortgage or a rent-to-own agreement). As of 2000, there were 11 homes with 1 or 2 persons in the household, 98 homes with 3 or 4 persons in the household, and 102 homes with 5 or more persons in the household. The average number of people per household was 2.76 individuals. In 2008 there were 129 single family homes (or 54.2% of the total) out of a total of 238 homes and apartments. There were a total of 4 empty apartments for a 1.7% vacancy rate. As of 2007, the construction rate of new housing units was 1.6 new units per 1000 residents.

In the 2007 federal election the most popular party was the SVP which received 43.1% of the vote. The next three most popular parties were the SP (15.5%), the CVP (9.7%) and the Green Party (9.1%).

The entire Swiss population is generally well educated. In Effingen about 77.3% of the population (between age 25–64) have completed either non-mandatory upper secondary education or additional higher education (either university or a Fachhochschule). Of the school age population (in the 2008/2009 school year), there are 35 students attending primary school in the municipality.

The historical population is given in the following table:

Historical population
Year	Pop.	±%
1764	265	—
1850	504	+90.2%
1900	431	−14.5%
1950	395	−8.4%
1980	403	+2.0%
2000	632	+56.8%

== Heritage sites of national significance ==
The Roman road at the Bözberg near Effingen was listed as a heritage site of national significance but is no longer listed in the 2009 inventory.

== Transportation ==
The municipality is located on the A3 motorway.

== Economy ==
As of 2007, Effingen had an unemployment rate of 1.53%. As of 2005, there were 53 people employed in the primary economic sector and about 18 businesses involved in this sector. 11 people are employed in the secondary sector and there are 5 businesses in this sector. 101 people are employed in the tertiary sector, with 20 businesses in this sector.

As of 2000 there was a total of 301 workers who lived in the municipality. Of these, 214 or about 71.1% of the residents worked outside Effingen while 51 people commuted into the municipality for work. There were a total of 138 jobs (of at least 6 hours per week) in the municipality. Of the working population, 18.3% used public transportation to get to work, and 52% used a private car.

== Religion ==
From the 2000 census, 170 or 26.9% were Roman Catholic, while 353 or 55.9% belonged to the Swiss Reformed Church. Of the rest of the population, there was 1 individual who belonged to the Christian Catholic faith.
