= A3 motorway (Switzerland) =

Motorway in northeast Switzerland

A3

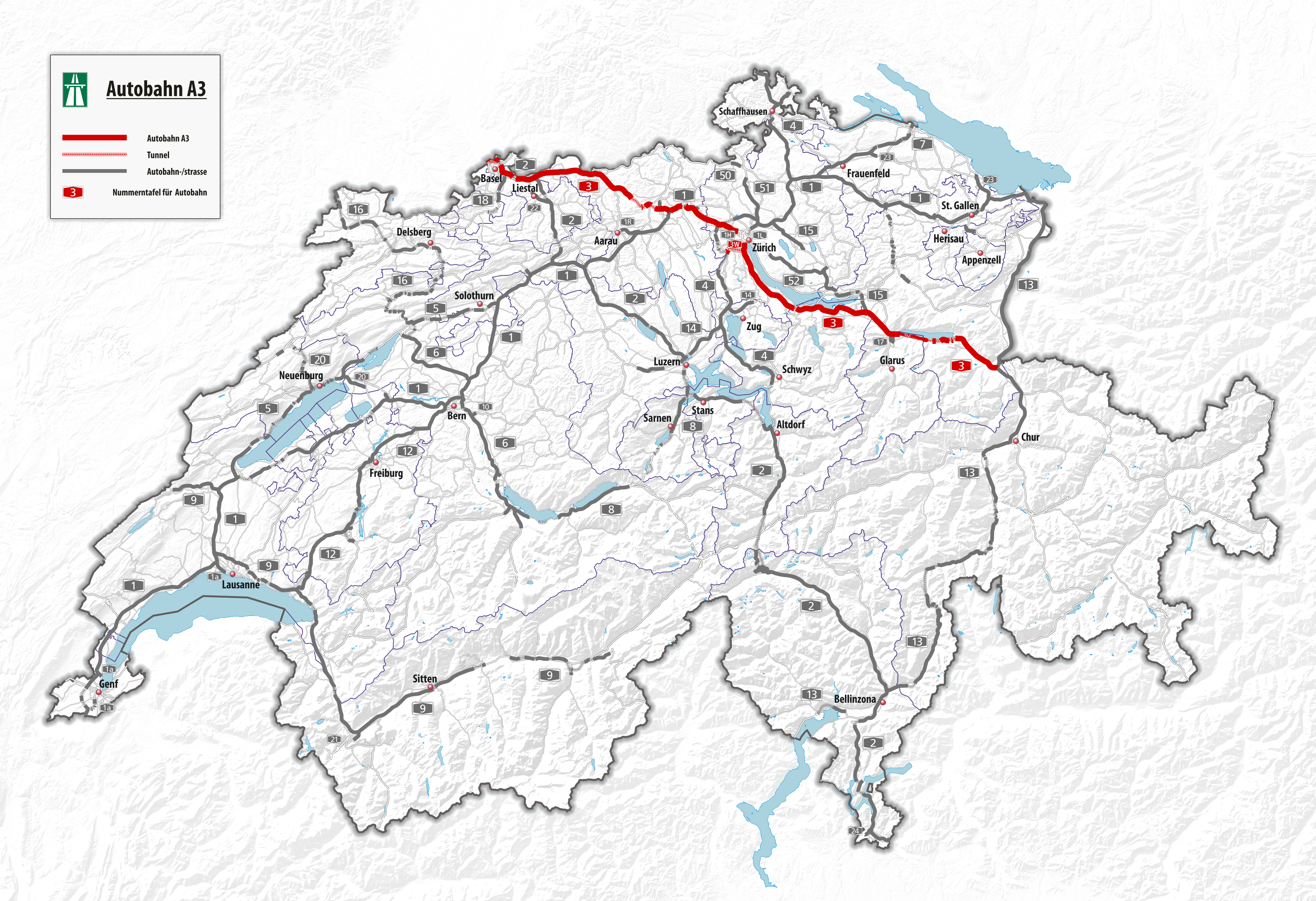
- Location of the A3 within Switzerland

Route information
- Length: 180 km (110 mi)

Major junctions
- From: A35 at French border
- To: A13

Location
- Country: Switzerland

Highway system
- Transport in Switzerland; Motorways

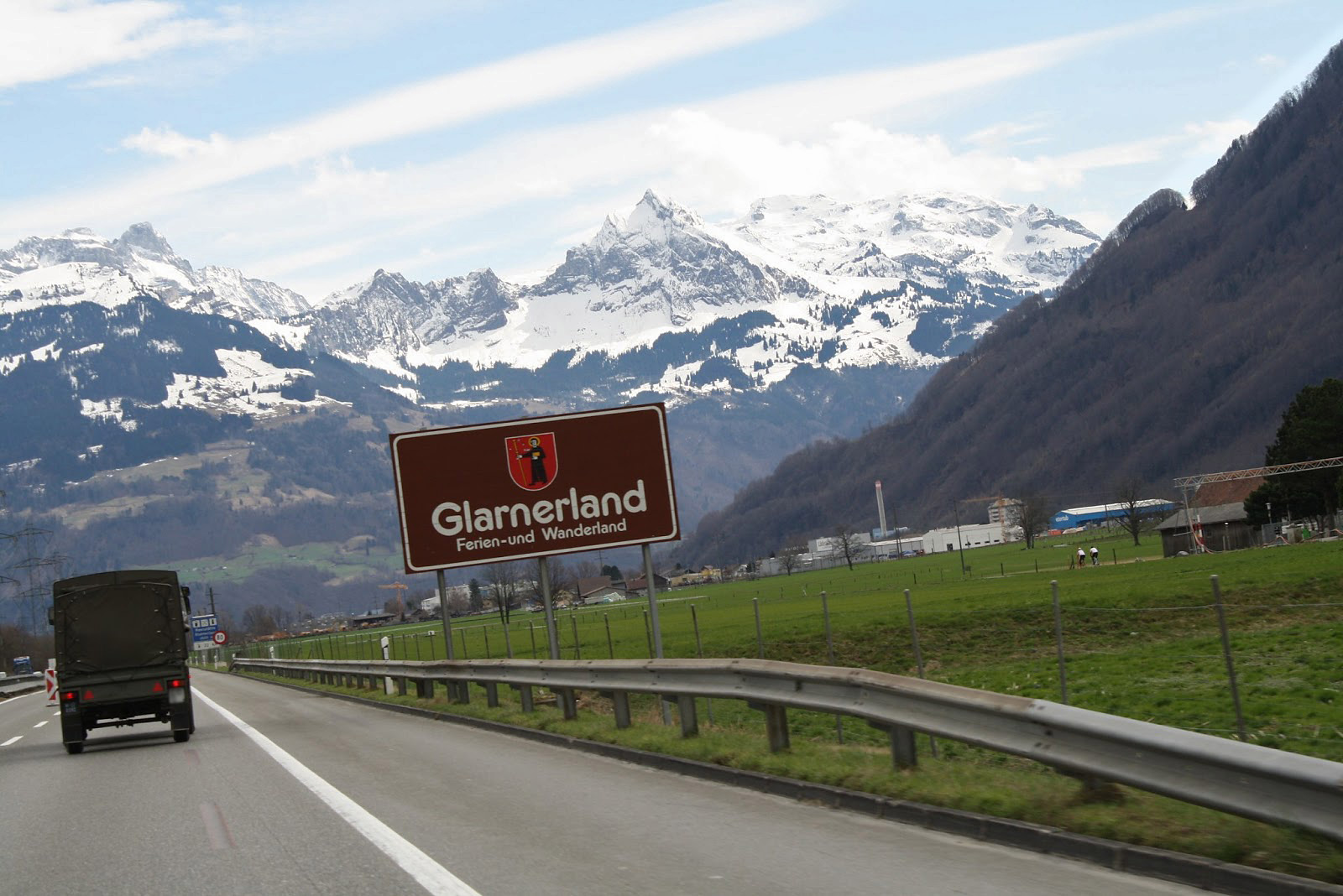
Glarner Alps as seen from the A3 motorway, Canton of Glarus, Switzerland.

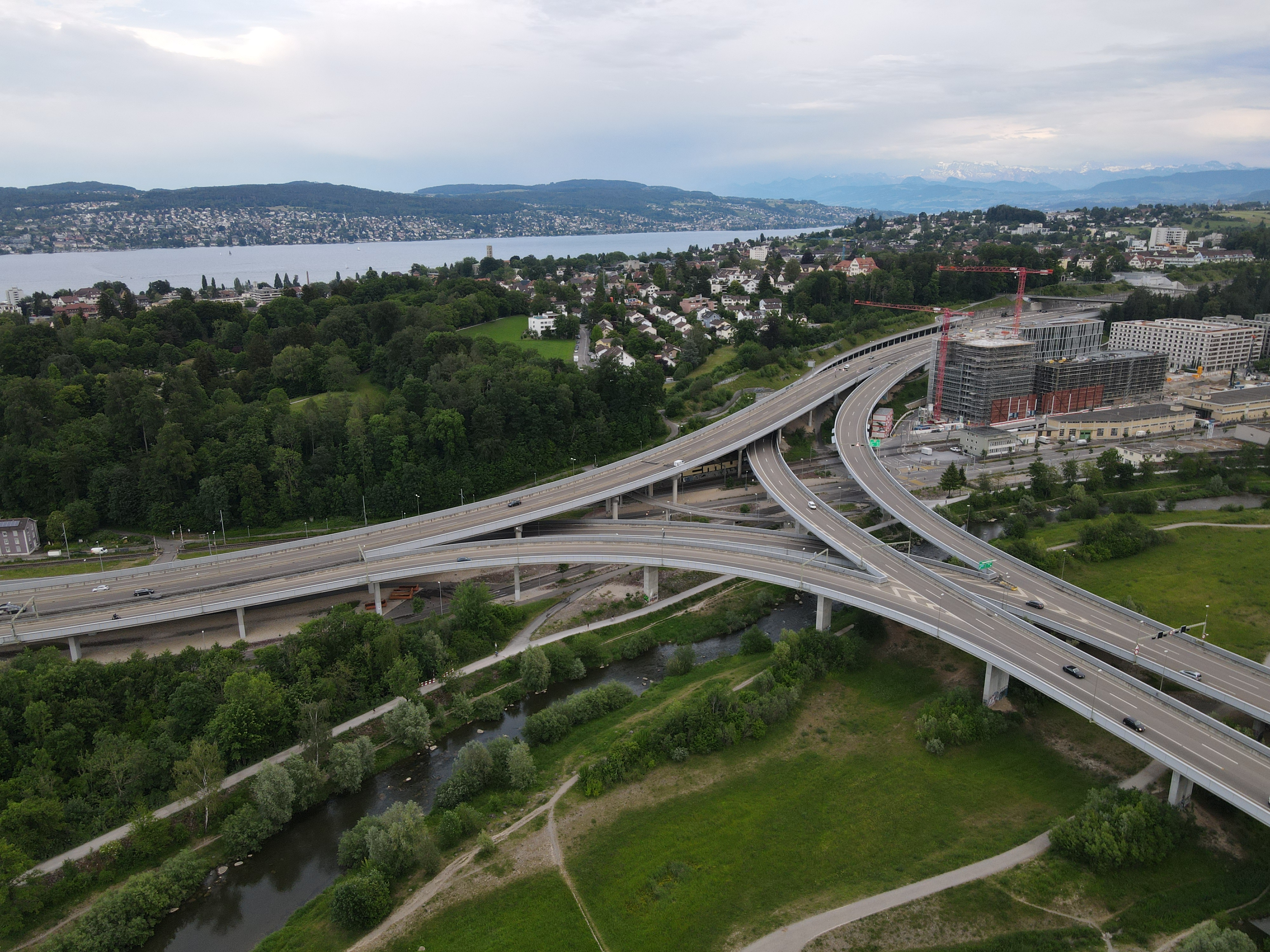
The A3 motorway seen at the junction with the Uetliberg Tunnel, in Wollishofen, Zürich.

The A3 is a motorway in northeast Switzerland, running diagonally from France toward the southeast border, and passing by Zürich on the way. The total length of the A3 motorway spans roughly 180 kilometres (110 mi), but parts of the road share sections of the A1 and A2 motorways.

The A3 belongs to the Swiss motorway network. It starts at the border in Basel, where it connects to French motorway A35. From the Wiese Motorway Fork, the route is shared with the A2.

At Augst, the motorway splits, with the A2 branching off and the A3 continuing past Rheinfelden and Frick. After the Bözberg tunnel is the Birrfeld Motorway Fork, near Birmenstorf. Here, the A1 and A3 share the same route as far as Motorway Interchange Limmattal, where the A3 goes towards Urdorf and the Uetliberg Tunnel which was opened on May 4, 2009. After Zürich the motorway weaves through the hills of the south-east bank of Lake Zürich. It continues along the Walensee (Walen Lake), and on to Mels where it ends at a junction with the A13.

The A3 represents (together with a section of the A1) the most important connection between Basel and Zürich, and (together with a section of the A13) the most important connection Zürich–Chur.

== Sections ==
=== Weesen-Murg ===
A special feature is the highway section at Lake Walen. Between Weesen and Murg in 1964, the N3 center was opened as a main road and led by the six tunnels: Ofenegg (370 metres or 1,210 feet), Weisswand (1,100 metres or 3,600 feet), Standenhorn (460 metres or 1,510 feet), Glattwand (160 metres or 520 feet), Mühlehorn (300 metres or 980 feet), and Stutz (180 metres or 590 feet).

The highway section has been extended since 1986 with the opening of the Kerenzerberg Tunnel (5.76 kilometres or 3.58 miles), which handles the road to Murg / Sargans. The old six tunnels and the road on the shores of Lake Walen were converted to unidirectional operation and now form the carriageway to Weesen / Zürich.

=== Zürich Western Bypass ===
Since May 4, 2009, with the opening of the highway section between the port Birmensdorf and Zürich, the branch South- the last section of the so-called "Western Bypass" - the A3 motorway is continuous between Basel and Sargans.

With the opening to traffic of the new section on May 4, two existing sections of highway have been renumbered. The leader in the city of Zürich Autobahnast Limmattal - Hardturm (always officially recorded as N1) is now known as A1 (Switzerland) or A1H (Shuttle Hardturm) rather than A3. The leading out of town Autobahnast Wiedikon - Zürich south, the so-called Sihlhochstrasse is referred to as the new A3W (feeder Wiedikon).

Also initiated, with the opening of the Western Bypass, the first stage of the flanking measures pass the residential areas along the former "West tangent" in the city of Zürich. The existing road trains, which were used for urban transit highway connection endpoints and Wiedikon Hardturm, were temporarily contracted on May 2, each for one traffic lane in each direction. In the following months until the summer of 2010, dismantling will continue of the "temporary" transit routes to district roads (West Street and Sihlfeldstrasse) and urban main roads (Seebahnstrasse und Schimmelstrasse)). In addition to various structural measures that are placed on the axis of incidence via Wollishofen and Albisrieden, additional traffic lights are used to regulate traffic flow in the metering equipment and make the side-traffic into the residential neighborhoods unattractive.

== Junction list ==
Junctions

A 35	France
	Border Basel/Saint-Louis-Motorway
(1)	Euroairport
(2)	Basel Kannenfeld
	St. Johann (650 m)
(3)	Basel St. Johann
	Dreirosenbrücke
(4)	Basel Klybeck
	Horburg (1090 m)
(5)	Basel Nord / Kleinhüningen
(5)	Motorway Fork Basel Wiese A 2
	Schwarzwald (560 m)
(6)	Basel Badischer Bahnhof
	Schwarzwaldbrücke
(7)	Basel Wettstein
(8)	Basel Ost / Breite
(9)	Basel Süd / City
	Pratteln (900 m)
(10)	Motorway Fork Hagnau (J18)
(10)	Basel St. Jakob
	Schweizerhalle
(11)	Pratteln
	Pratteln
(12)	Liestal
(13)	Motorway Fork Augst A 2
(14)	Motorway Fork Rheinfelden A 861
(15)	Rheinfelden Ost
(16)	Eiken
(17)	Frick
(18)	Effingen
	Bözberg (3700 m)
	Schinznacherfeld (450 m)
	Habsburg (1540 m)
(19)	Brugg
(20)	Motorway Fork Birrfeld A 1
(21)	Baden West
	Baregg (1080 m)
(22)	Neuenhof
	Neuenhof
(23)	Wettingen Ost
	Würenlos / "Fressbalken"
(24)	Spreitenbach - geplant
(25)	Dietikon
(26)	Motorway Interchange Limmattal; A 1 A 1H A 4
(27)	Urdorf Nord
	Niederurdorf/Honeret (450 m)
(28)	Urdorf Süd
	Eggrain (480 m)
(29)	Uitikon
	Hafnerberg (1385 m)
(30)	Birmensdorf
	Aescher (2160 m)
(31)	Motorway Fork Zürich West A 4
	Uetliberg (4410 m)
(32)	Motorway Fork Zürich Süd A 3W
	Entlisberg (550 m)
(33)	Zürich Wollishofen
(34)	Thalwil
(35)	Horgen
(36)	Wädenswil
	Herrlisberg
(37)	Richterswil
	Blatt (510 m)
(38)	Wollerau
	Feusisberg
(39)	Schindellegi
(40)	Pfäffikon SZ
	Altendorf
(41)	Lachen
(42)	Motorway Fork Reichenburg A 53
(43)	Bilten
	Glarnerland
(44)	Niederurnen
(45)	Weesen
	Kerenzerberg (5760 m)*
(46)	Mühlehorn
(47)	Murg
	Murgwald (1420 m)
	Quarten (1040 m)
	Fratten (320 m)
	Hof (560 m)
	Raischibe (800 m)
(48)	Walenstadt
(49)	Flums
(50)	Mels/Sargans
(51)	Motorway Fork Sarganserland A 13
A 13

Branch A3w (A3)

	Motorway End
(1)	Zürich Wiedikon
	Sihlhochstrasse
(2)	Zürich Brunau
(3)	Motorway Fork Zürich Süd A 3
A 3

Branch A1h (A3)

A 3	A 1 A 4
(1)	Motorway Interchange Limmattal A 1 A 3 A 4
(2)	Zürich Altstetten
(3)	Hardturm
	Motorway End
