= Glarus Nord =

- Municipality
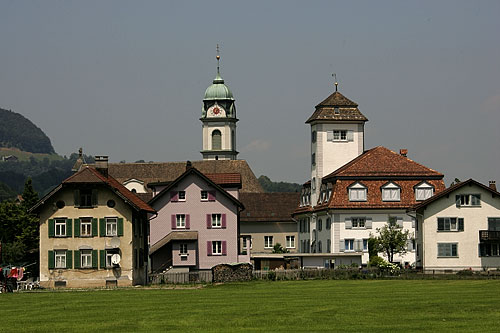
- Näfels village

- Flag Coat of arms
- Location of Glarus Nord
- Location within Switzerland Location within Canton of Glarus
- Coordinates: 47°06′N 9°04′E
- Country: Switzerland
- Canton: Glarus
- District: n.a.

Area
  - Total: 146.98 km^{2} (56.75 sq mi)
- Elevation: 437 m (1,434 ft)

Population (2009)
  - Total: 16,438
  - Density: 111.84/km^{2} (289.66/sq mi)
- Time zone: UTC+01:00 (CET)
  - Summer (DST): UTC+02:00 (CEST)
- Postal code: 8752, 8753, 8757, 8758, 8865–8868, 8874
- SFOS number: 1630
- ISO 3166 code: CH-GL
- Localities: Bilten, Filzbach, Mollis, Mühlehorn, Näfels, Niederurnen, Oberurnen, Obstalden, Ziegelbrücke.
- Surrounded by: Schänis (SG), Weesen (SG), Amden (SG), Quarten (SG), Glarus Süd, Glarus, Innerthal (SZ), Schübelbach (SZ), Reichenburg (SZ), Benken (SG)
- Website: www.glarus-nord.ch

Glarus Nord is one of three municipalities of the canton of Glarus, Switzerland (the others being Glarus and Glarus Süd).

Effective from 1 January 2011, Glarus Nord incorporates the former municipalities of Bilten, Filzbach, Mollis, Mühlehorn, Näfels, Niederurnen, Oberurnen and Obstalden.

== History ==
=== Bilten ===
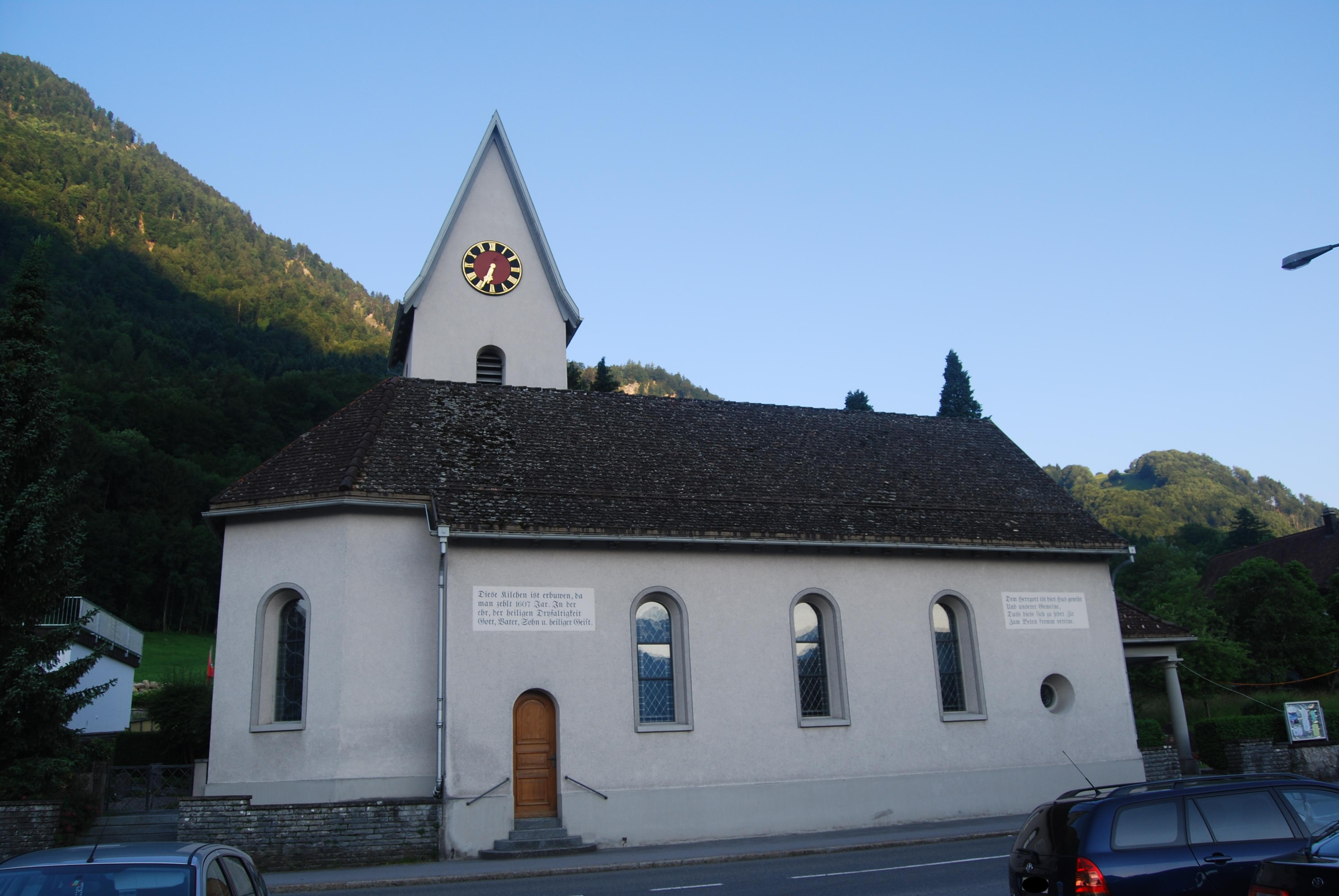
Bilten village church

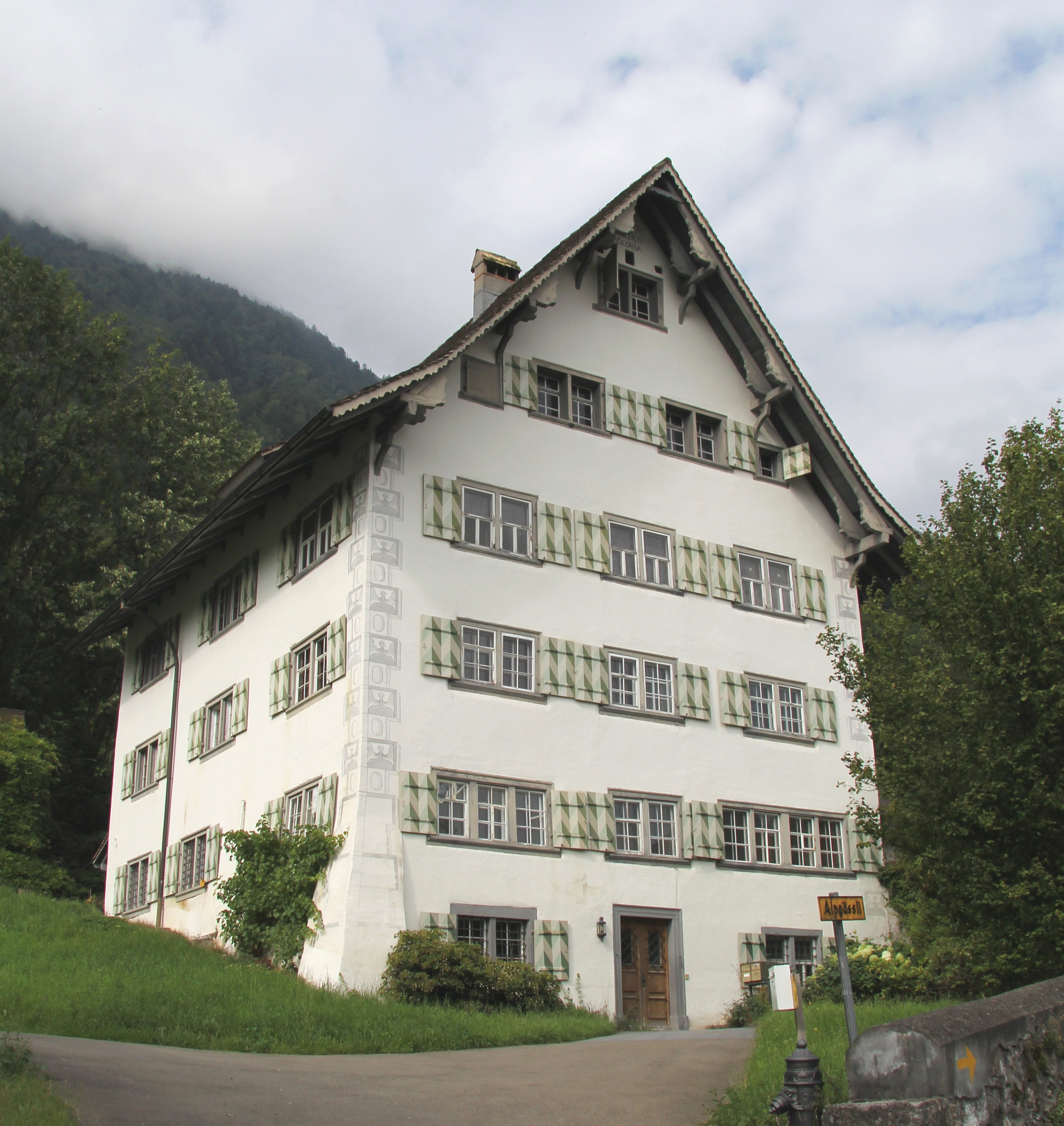
Elsener house (also known as Herrensitz Milt)

Bilten is first mentioned in 1050 as Billitun.

The area around Bilten was probably inhabited in the Roman era. By the mid-11th century, Schänis Abbey owned a large part of the village, and in 1178 the Pope confirmed Schänis Abbey's ownership of the village. St. Catherine's Chapel in the village was first mentioned in 1345. In either 1405/06 or 1415, the village joined the County of Glarus. The village's residents were no longer required to pay rents to Schänis Abbey after 1412, but remained partly under the Abbey's control until 1612. In 1528, the majority of the residents embraced the Protestant Reformation and converted to the new faith. Subsequently, Bilten became part of the Reformed parish of Niederurnen. A village church was consecrated in 1607.

From the 16th until the 18th century, the alpine pastures around the village were used to raise large livestock for sale to other towns. As a sign of the growing wealth in Bilten, in 1608 a local family built the Renaissance style Elsener House. In the 18th century the local farmers gradually shifted from selling cattle to raising dairy cattle and selling dairy products. In the late 18th century, the Linth river began to silt up, and swamps and marshes formed along the river near Bilten. The marshy land caused disease which only ended with the Linth correction project of 1807–23. Between 1887 and 1939 the Biltener creek was gradually brought under control and channeled, ending its frequent flooding.

The first school was built in Bilten in 1839. In 1853 a boys' boarding school opened in the Elsener House, and it remained in operation until 1944. The village was connected to the Nordostbahn (Swiss North-eastern railway) network in 1875. Until the mid-20th century Bilten remained an agricultural village. The Kunz slaughterhouse, which opened in 1958 and closed in 1995, and the insulation and packaging material company Wannerit AG, which opened in 1964, brought some industry to Bilten. When the A3 motorway was built through the valley in 1973, a number of factories took advantage of the convenient transport links and moved into Bilten. By 1990, over three-quarters of the working population were employed in industry. In 1976, a wastewater treatment plant serving the Glarus valley and surrounding area was built in Bilten.

=== Filzbach ===
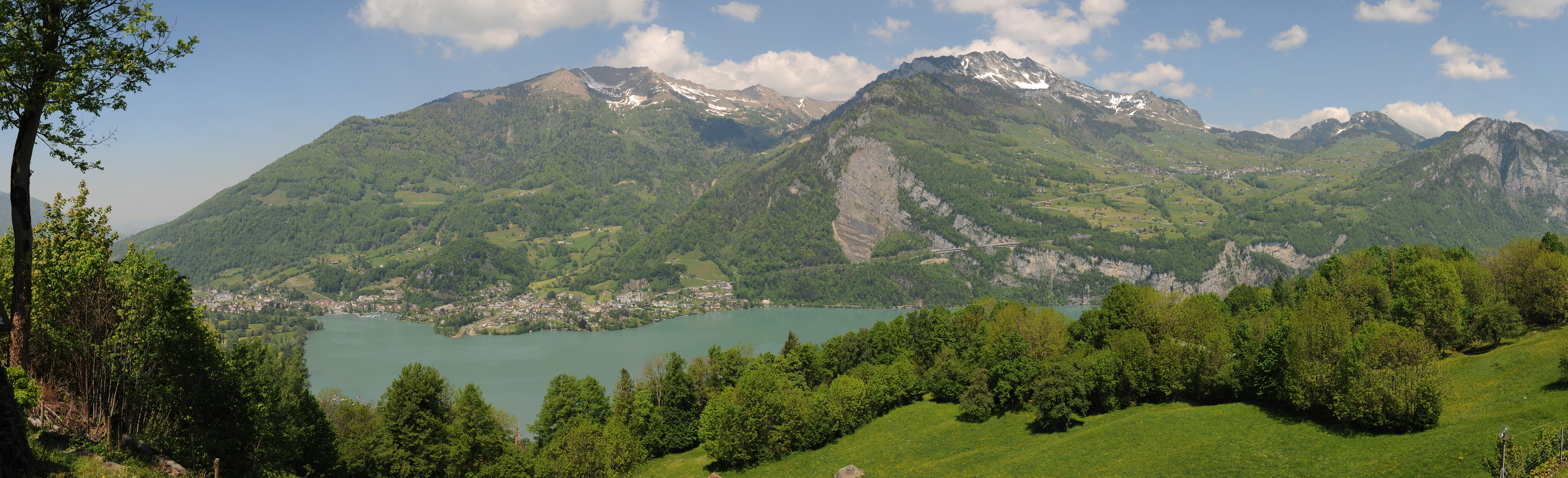
View from Filzbach across Walen Lake toward Amden

Filzbach is first mentioned in 1394 as Vilentzspach.

The ruins of a Roman watchtower, Vor dem Wald, from the time of Emperor Augustus indicate that the area was inhabited by the Roman era. The tower was built in the second decade BC and abandoned in 16 AD. Little is known about the village during the Middle Ages. It first became part of Glarus after the Battle of Sempach in 1386. The inhabitants of Filzbach were under the control of Schänis Abbey until the 14th century when they became part of the parish of Obstalden. They converted to the new Reformed faith in 1528.

The farmers of Filzbach practiced subsistence agriculture into the 17th century. By the 18th century most farmers raised orchards in their fields. Today they live mostly on alpine herding. During the 18th century many families also began cottage industry spinning and cloth making to bring in extra money. A silk factory was built in 1889 and remained in operation for just over a century, closing in 1990. A small tourism industry developed in the 19th century and in 1926 the small resort Lihn des Blauen Kreuzes opened. After the Walenseestrasse was built along Walen Lake, tourism increased dramatically and two chair lifts were built. The village school was built in 1838 and is still in operation today.

=== Mollis ===
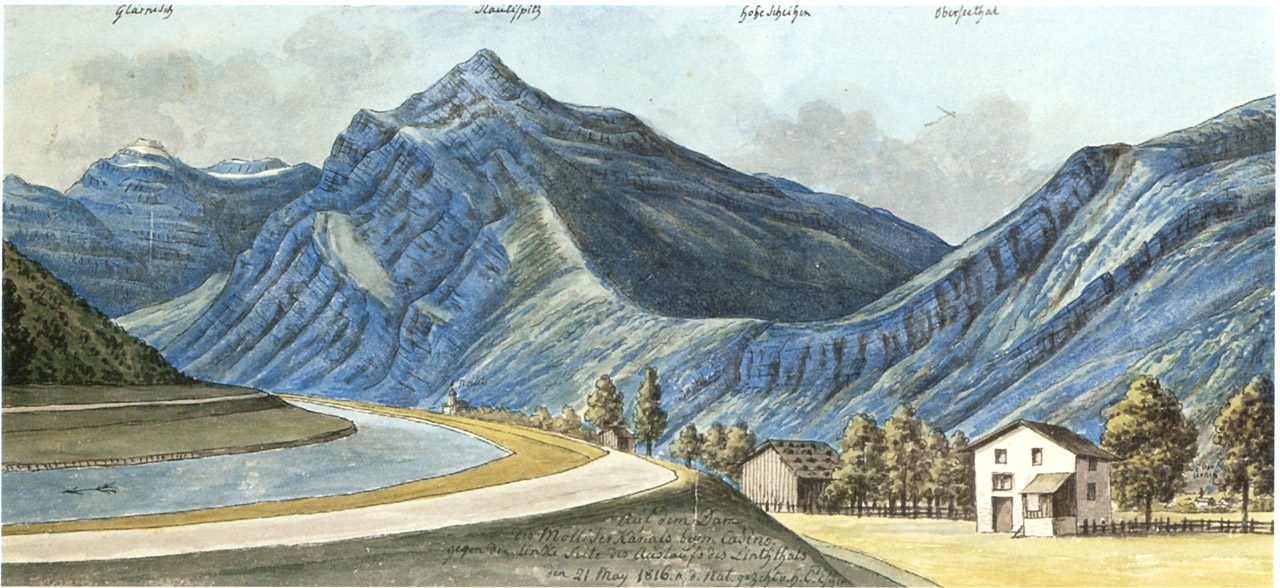
Mollis canal, watercolor 1816

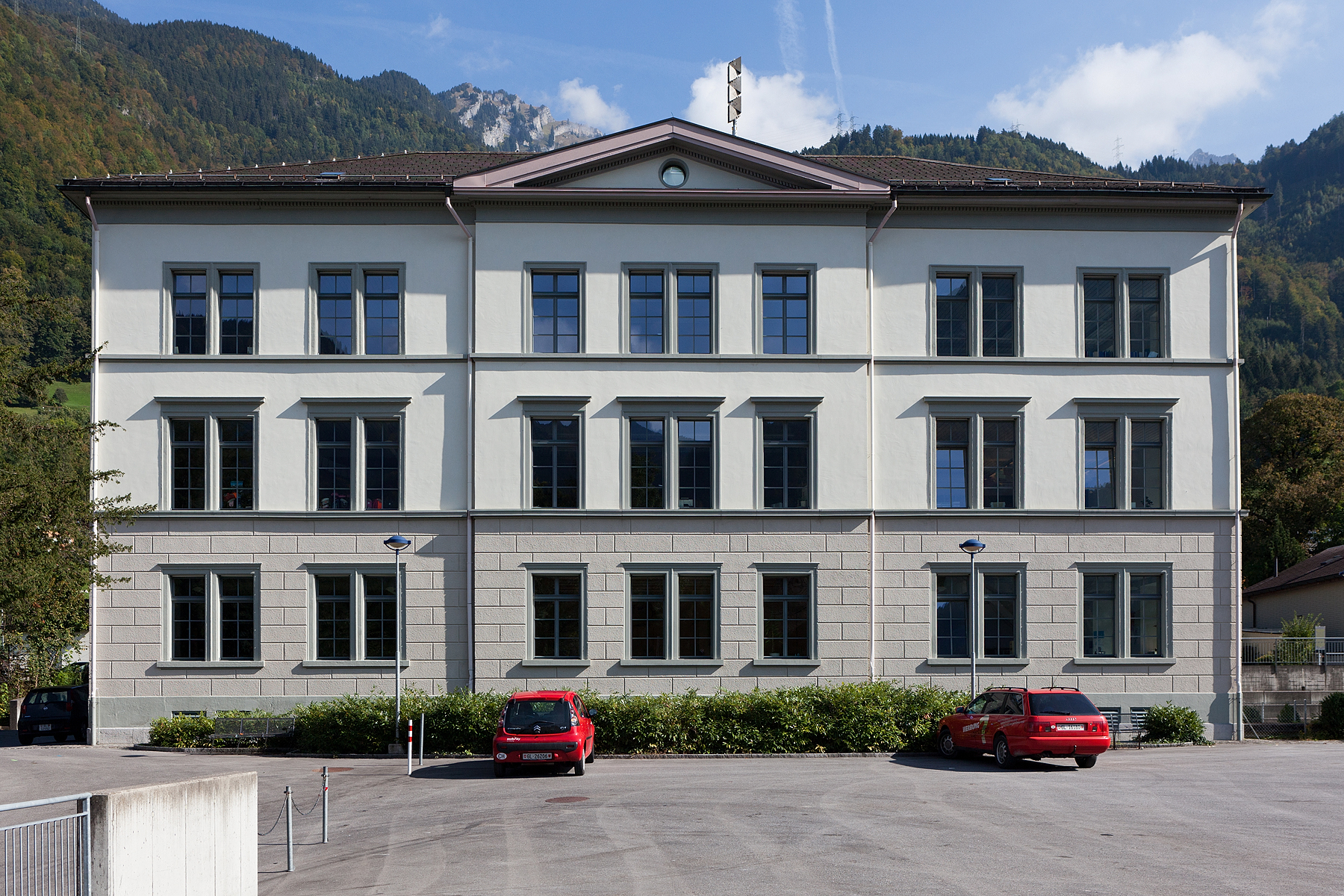
Village schoolhouse

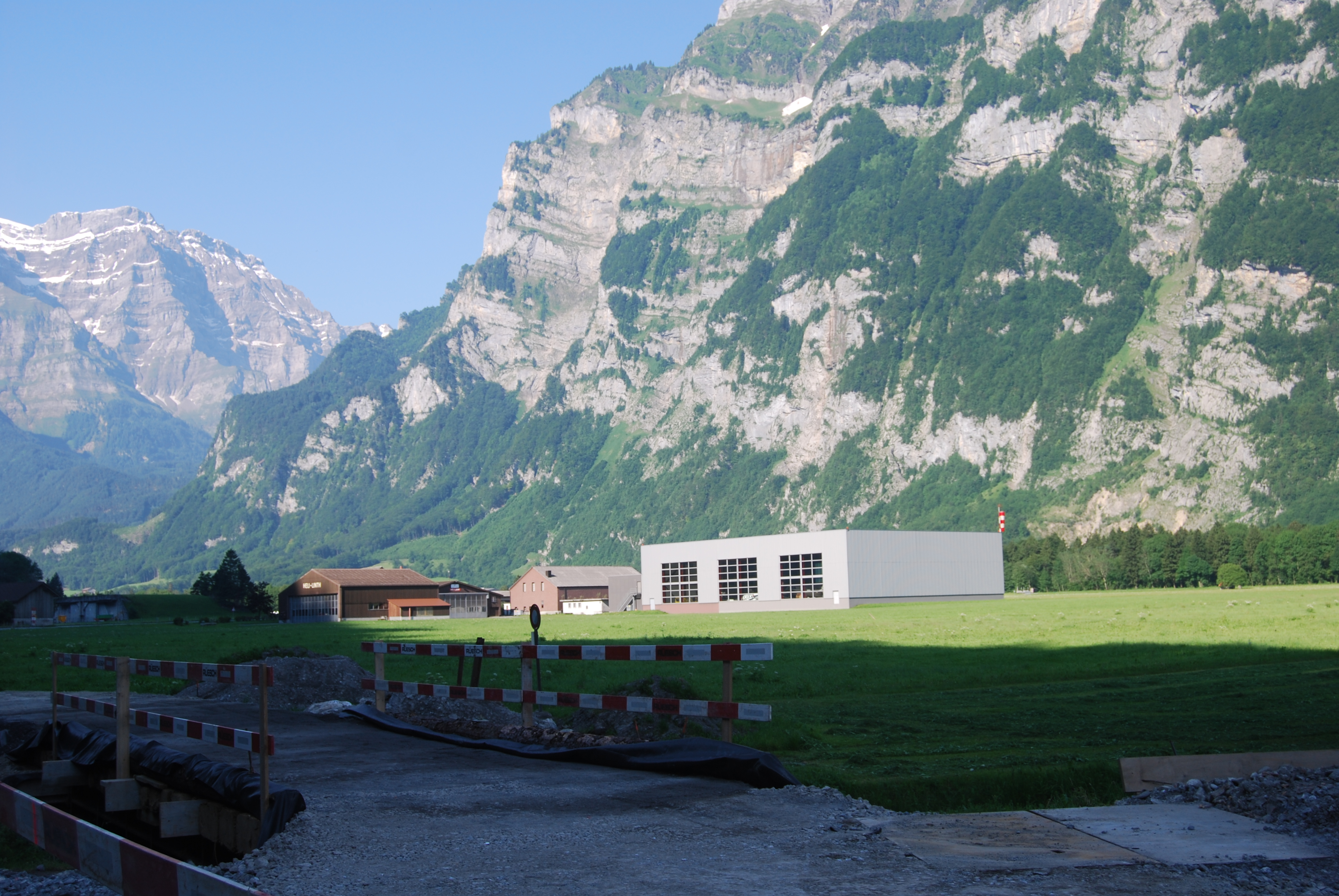
Buildings at Mollis airfield

Mollis is first mentioned in 1288.

The oldest trace of a settlement in Mollis is a Gallo-Roman temple discovered on the Hüttenböschen about 100 m (330 ft) from Walen Lake. The temple was probably built between AD 50 and 150 and used until the 4th century. In the 8th century, Säckingen Abbey acquired several large estates in Mollis. Parts of the medieval Letzi fortification (a Cultural Property of National Significance in Näfels) were built near Beglingen village after the Battle of Näfels in 1388.

The village chapel was built in 1280. It was elevated to a church in 1319 and in 1444 became a parish church for the newly created Mollis parish. Fridolin Brunner, the parish priest in 1523–25, introduced the Reformation to Mollis. However, many residents remained Catholic and the icons remained in the church and mass was celebrated until 1529. Once the village church converted to the new faith, the Catholic faithful joined the parishes of Näfels or Oberurnen. The current church was built in 1761 by Hans Ulrich Grubenmann, and the Roman Catholic St. Mary's Church opened in 1963.

Until the 15th century the local economy was dominated by subsistence agriculture and shepherding. After that time, sheep were gradually replaced by larger livestock such as cattle which summered in alpine pastures and were raised for sale. In the 18th century, local farmers switched to raising dairy cattle. In the 16th century a spring fed pool was built on the Walenberg and around 1600 another opened in Rüfi. From 1600 until the 19th century the pools and the visitors that they brought were another source of income for the village. Between 1714 and 1789 many of the residents began spinning cotton yarn, which raised the standard of living for the whole village. Another source of income came from many residents who became mercenary officers: so many officers from Mollis made their fortunes in foreign military service that the village became known as an "Aristocrats' Nest". Following the 1798 French invasion and the conflicts during the Helvetic Republic, troops were often sent to Mollis and the population suffered under frequent occupation.

The construction of the Escher canal in 1807-11 and the Linth correction which finished in 1827 finally ended century-long conflicts with neighboring municipalities over the boundaries along the river.

The Kerenzerbergstrasse was built in 1836–51, and helped connect Mollis to the surrounding towns. In 1859 the United Swiss Railways built a station between Näfels and Mollis. In 1856 the Jenny & Co. spinning and weaving factory moved into the village. The large factory remained in operation until 1967. In 1860 Pfeiffer AG built a linen factory, which was acquired by the American Standard Textile Company in 2000.

The municipality built a school in 1862. The secondary school, which was open from 1863 until 1872 and then again after 1883 was used by students from Kerenzen village until 1973. A girls' boarding school opened in 1846. It later became a Children's and Youth Home, but this closed in 1983. A military airfield was built on the commons in 1936. It became a civilian airfield in 2005.

=== Mühlehorn ===
Mühlehorn is first mentioned in 1551 as Mülihorn.

=== Näfels ===
Näfels is first mentioned in 1240 as Nevels.

In 1388, the Swiss Confederates beat the Habsburgs at the Battle of Näfels.

=== Niederurnen ===
Niederurnen is first mentioned either before 1045 or between 1077 and 1101 as Niter Urnnen.

=== Oberurnen ===
Oberurnen is first mentioned in 1340 as Obern Urannen.

=== Obstalden ===
Obstalden is first mentioned in 1310.

== Geography ==
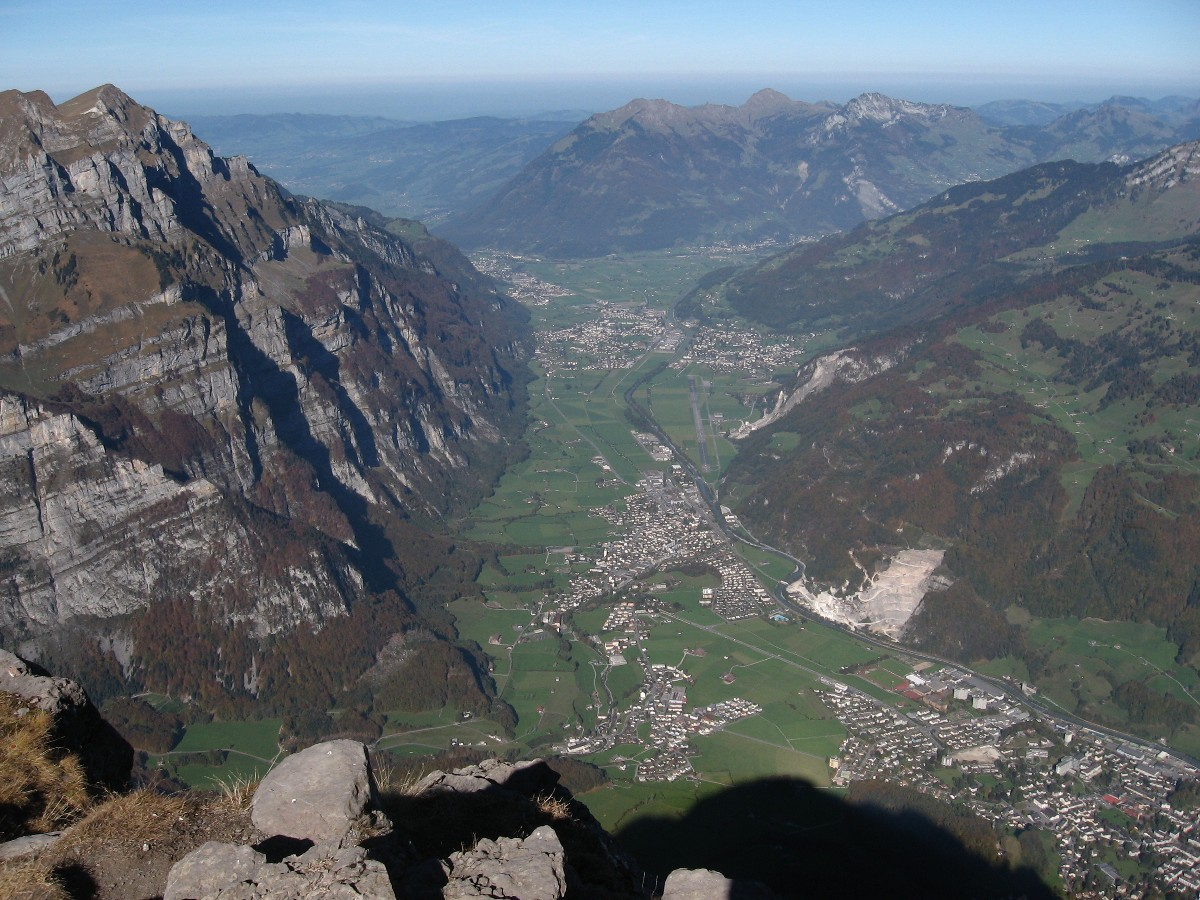
View of the Glarus valley, Glarus lower right corner, Mollis, Näfels and Niederurnen visible further up the valley

The former municipalities that now make up Glarus Nord have a total combined area of 146.98 km^{2} (56.75 sq mi). Based on the 2004/09 survey about 37.2% of the total area is used for agricultural purposes, while 40.5% is forested. Of the rest of the land, 6.0% is settled (buildings or roads) and 16.3% is unproductive land. Over the past two decades (1979/85-2004/09) the amount of land that is settled has increased by 132 ha (330 acres) and the agricultural land has decreased by 211 ha (520 acres).

== Demographics ==
Glarus Nord has a population (as of December 2020) of 18,832. As of 2013, 22.6% of the population are resident foreign nationals. Over the last 3 years (2010–2013) the population has changed at a rate of 4.31%. The birth rate in the municipality, in 2013, was 11.2 while the death rate was 8.6 per thousand residents.

As of 2013, children and teenagers (0–19 years old) make up 20.5% of the population, while adults (20–64 years old) are 62.9% and seniors (over 64 years old) make up 16.6%.

== Historic Population ==
The historical population is given in the following chart:

== Heritage sites of national significance ==
There are ten Swiss heritage sites of national significance located in the new municipality. Bilten and Filzbach are both home to one, the Herrensitz Milt or Elsener house in Bilten and the Roman watchtower Vor dem Wald in Filzbach. Mollis has three sites, the Herrensitz Haltli, the Hof and Höfli with garden pavillon at Steinackerstrasse 4 and the Zwicky house. Näfels is also home to three sites, the Freuler Palace and Museum of Glarus, the Catholic Church of St. Hilarius and the medieval fortifications known as the Letzi. Mühlehorn and Niederurnen both have one, the Hammerschmiede at Kohlplatz and the industrial plant and settlement of Jenny & Co., respectively. There are also three sites on the Inventory of Swiss Heritage Sites, the entire village of Mollis, the urbanized village of Näfels and the Jenny & Co. factory site at Ziegelbrücke.

The remains of the Roman watchtower Vor dem Wald or Voremwald are preserved on rocky knolls about 320 m (1,050 ft) above the southern shore of Walen Lake. They were first mentioned in 1846 and were excavated in 1956–59 by Rudolf Fritz Legler and Laur-Belart. The watchtower is a rectangular stone tower about 13.7 m × 12 m (45 ft × 39 ft) at the base. It had a cistern within the tower and an oval, walled courtyard. Pottery and weapons from the rule of Emperor Augustus indicate that the tower was occupied by the second decade BC. Together with the forts Biberlikopf in Schänis, St. Gallen and Stralegg in Amden, St. Gallen it was probably built to support the Roman Alpine campaign in 15 BC.

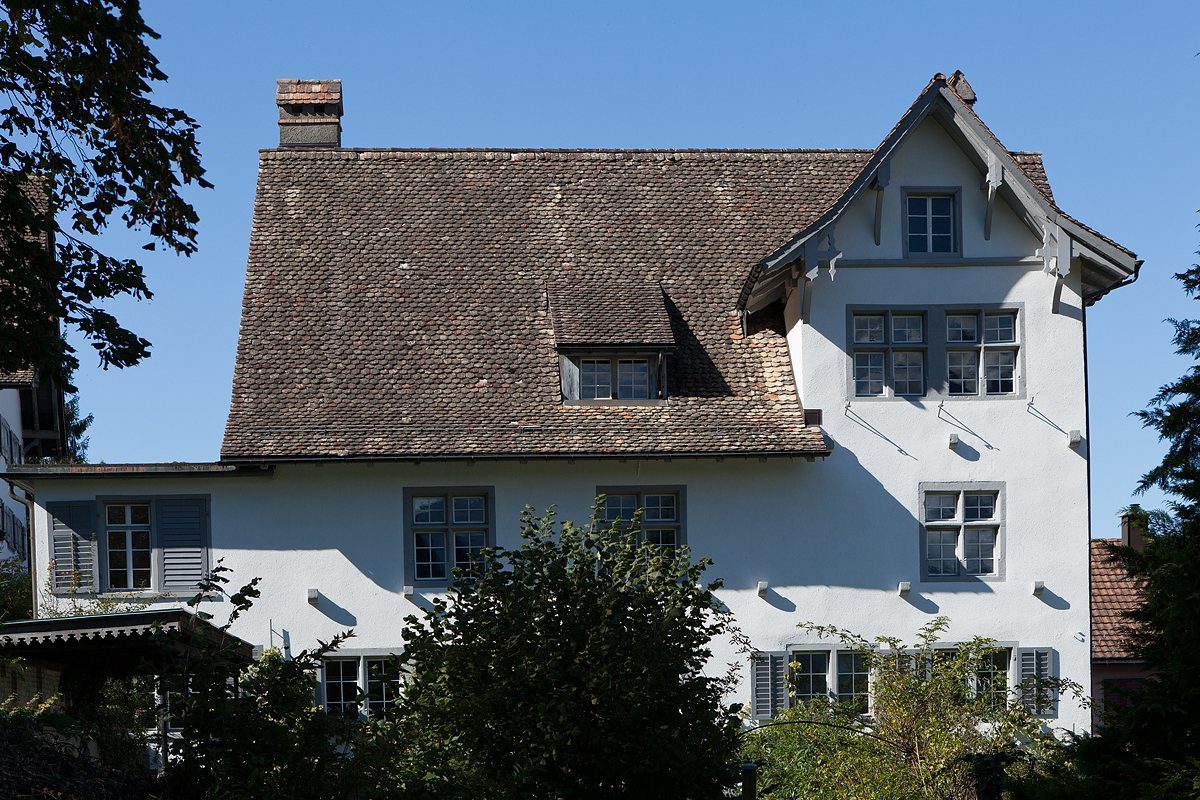
Herrensitz Milt / Elsener House

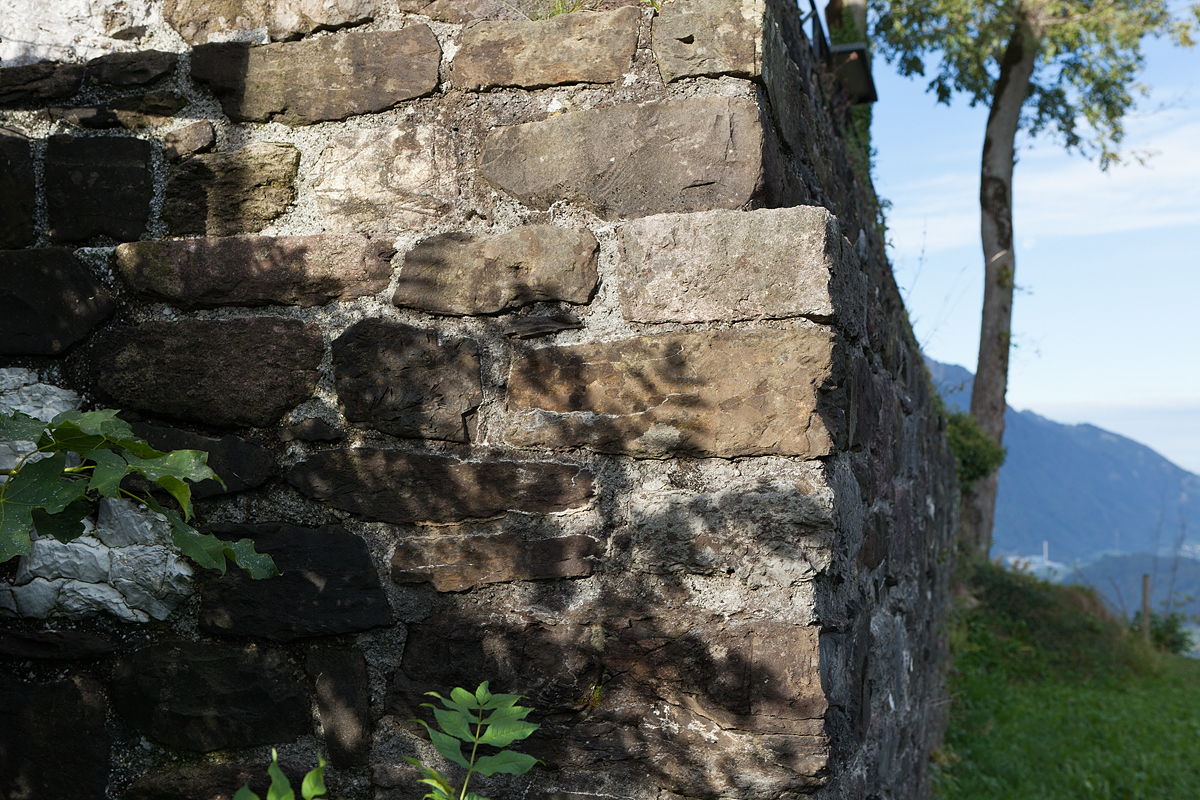
Roman Watchtower

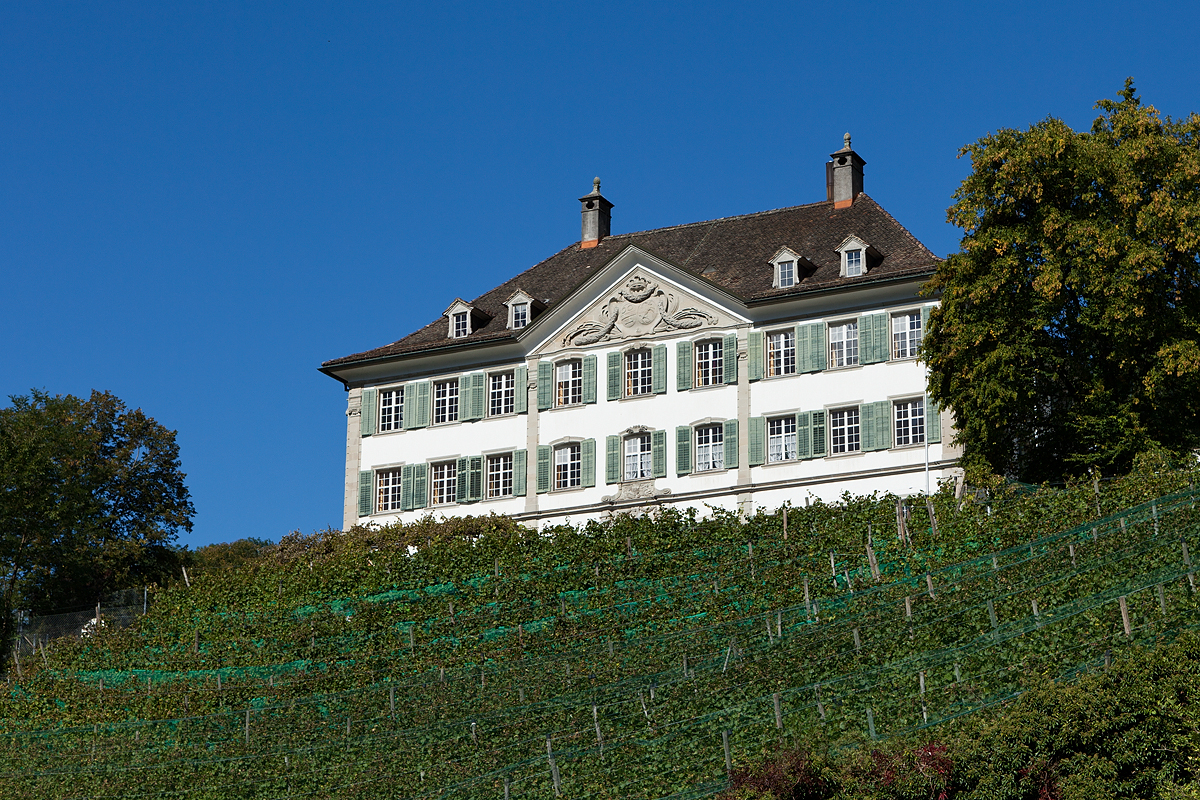
Herrensitz Haltli

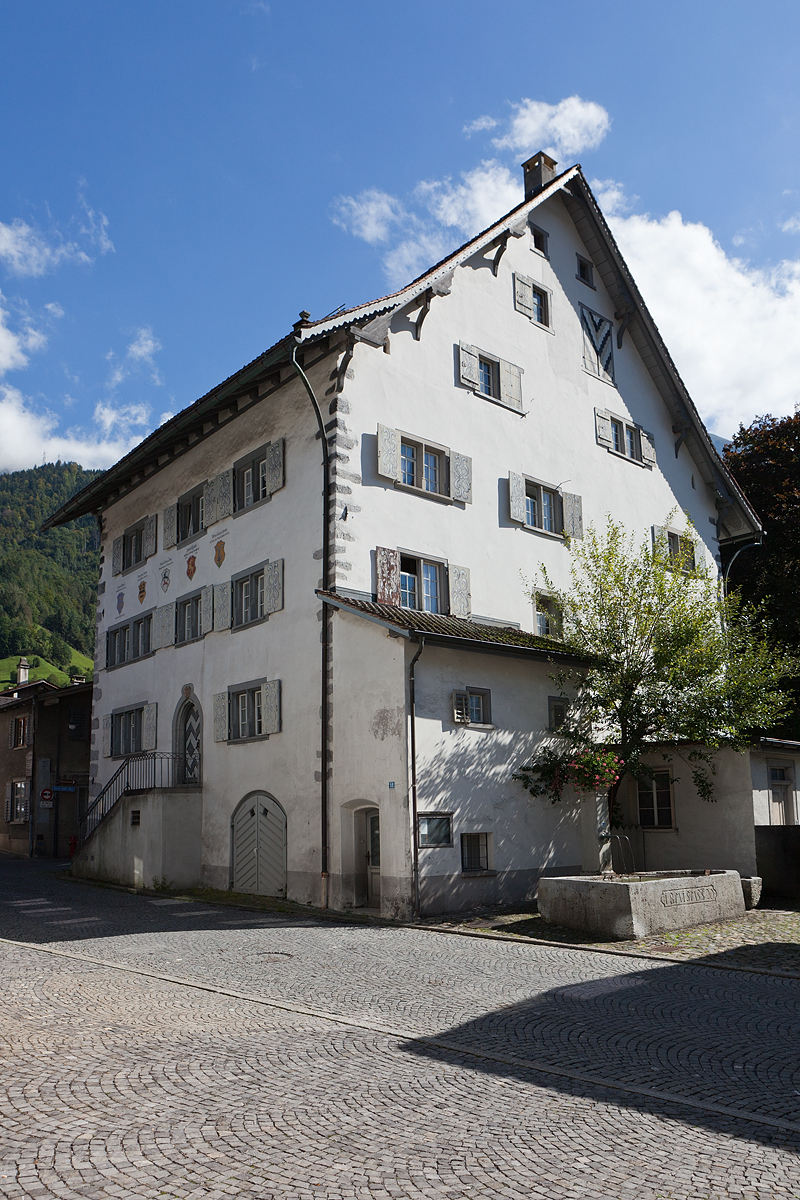
Zwicky House

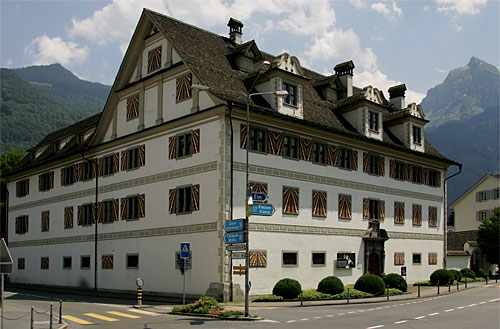
Freuler Palace and Museum of Glarus

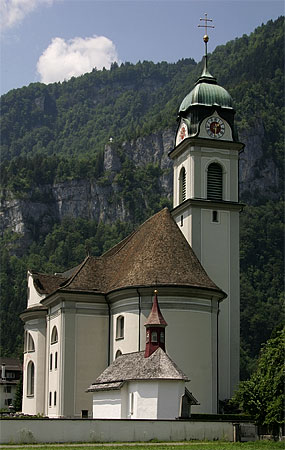
St. Hilarius Parish Church of Näfels

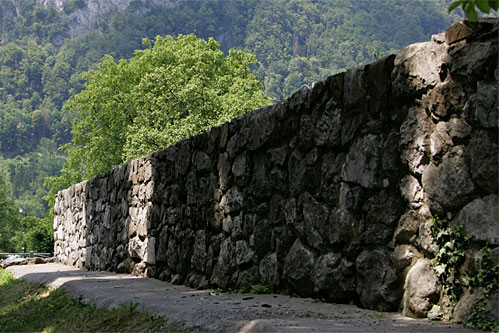
Letzi, Medieval Fortifications

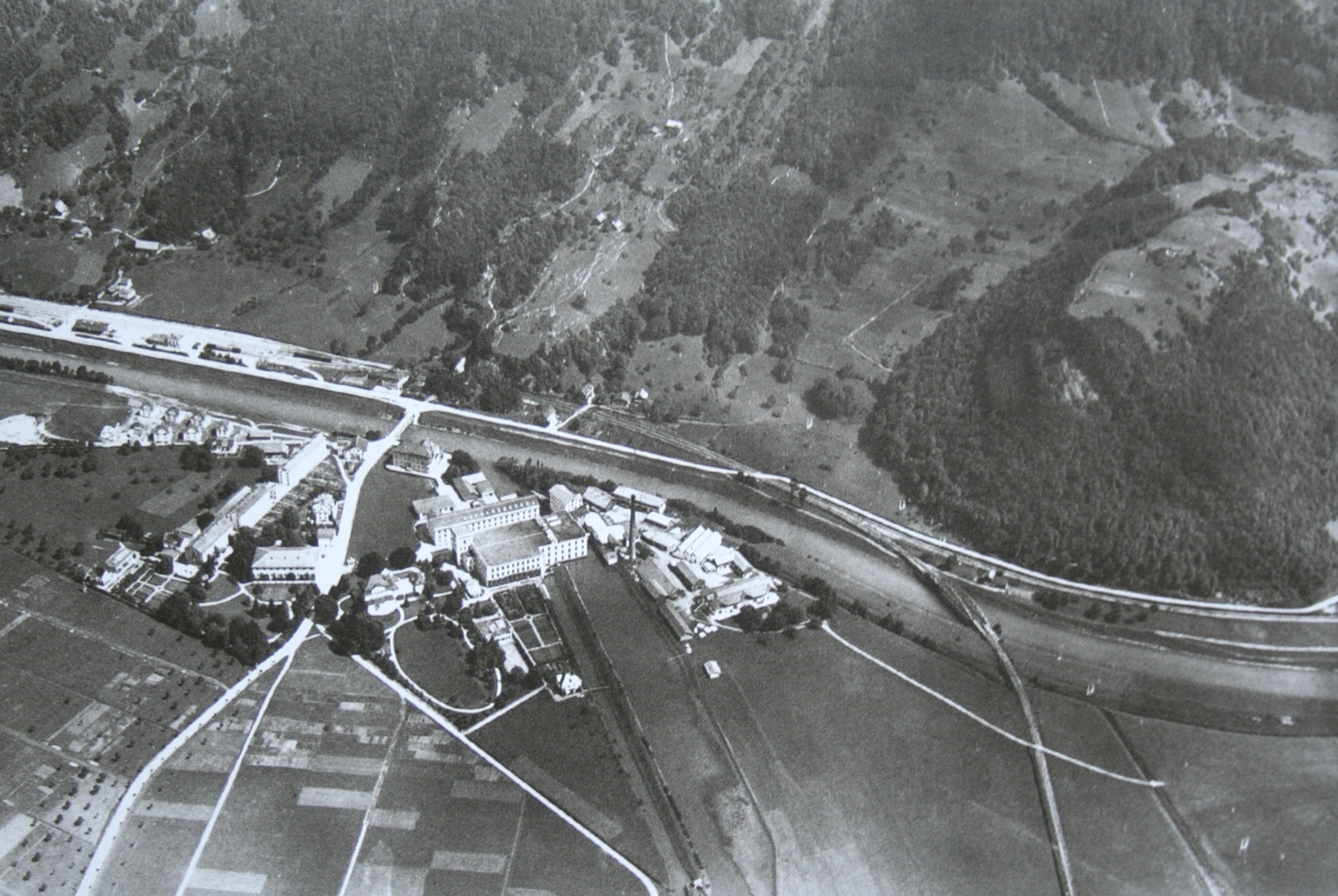
Factory Site at Ziegelbrücke

== Economy ==
As of 2012, there were a total of 8,330 people employed in the municipality. Of these, a total of 425 people worked in 158 businesses in the primary economic sector. The secondary sector employed 3,487 workers in 263 separate businesses. Finally, the tertiary sector provided 4,418 jobs in 878 businesses. In 2013 a total of 3.7% of the population received social assistance.

== Politics ==
In the 2015 federal election the most popular party was the BDP with 57.5% of the vote, followed by the SP with 38.4%. The remaining 4.1% went to unaffiliated or minor party candidates. In the federal election, a total of 4,355 votes were cast, and the voter turnout was 38.5%. The 2015 election saw a large change in the voting when compared to 2011. The percentage of the vote received by the SP increased sharply from 22.2% in 2011 to 38.4% in 2015, while the percentage that the BDP dropped from 66.5% to 57.5%.

== Crime ==
In 2014 the crime rate, of the over 200 crimes listed in the Swiss Criminal Code (running from murder, robbery and assault to accepting bribes and election fraud), in Glarus Nord was 38.9 per thousand residents. This rate is only 60.2% of the average rate in the entire country. During the same period, the rate of drug crimes was 5.7 per thousand residents. This rate is about half that of the nearby municipalities of Glarus and Glarus Süd and is only 57.6% of the national rate.

== Transportation ==
The municipality is located on the A3 motorway.

There are five railway stations (of which four are active) within the municipality:

- Bilten is on the Lake Zürich left-bank railway line. It is a stop on the Zürich S-Bahn S2 service that links Zürich and Ziegelbrücke. Ziegelbrücke railway station, just over the border in the canton of St Gallen, is on the same line, but also served by faster long-distance trains.
- Nieder- and Oberurnen and Näfels-Mollis are on the Ziegelbrücke–Linthal line. They are served by the Zürich S-Bahn S25 between Linthal and Zürich, and by the St. Gallen S-Bahn S6 between Rapperswil and Schwanden. As of the December 2023 timetable change, both services operate once per hour, combining to provide two trains per hour between Ziegelbrücke and Schwanden.
- Mühlehorn is on the Ziegelbrücke–Sargans line. It is a stop on the S4 service of the St. Gallen S-Bahn, which operates in a circular fashion in the direction of Sargans and St. Gallen.
- Weesen was a railway station on the Ziegelbrücke–Sargans railway line, which has been disused since December 2013. Although it served the town of Weesen in the canton of St. Gallen, the station is located in Glarus Nord (previously Mollis municipality).

== Notable people ==
- Karl Josef von Bachmann (1734 in Näfels – 1792) Commander Swiss Guard for Louis XVI, executed during the French Revolution
- Niklaus Franz von Bachmann (1740 in Näfels – 1831 in Näfels) a Swiss general who fought in the Napoleonic Wars
- Fritz Zwicky (1898–1974) Bulgarian-born American astronomer, buried in Mollis village
- Friedrich Schröder (1910 in Näfels – 1972) a German composer of light music
- Martin Landolt (born 1968 in Näfels) a politician and member of the Swiss National Council
