= Kerenzen-Mühlehorn =

Former municipality in Glarus, Switzerland

Coordinates: 47.118°N 9.173°E

Kerenzen-Mühlehorn is a former municipality in the canton of Glarus, Switzerland.

It ceased to exist in 1887, when it was split into the three new municipalities Filzbach, Mühlehorn and Obstalden.
