= Canton of Glarus =

Canton of Switzerland

Canton of Glarus Kanton Glarus (German)
- Canton
- Flag Coat of arms Brandmark
- Interactive map of Canton of Glarus
- Coordinates: 46°59′N 9°4′E
- Capital: Glarus
- Largest municipality: Glarus Nord
- Subdivisions: 3 municipalities

Government
  - President: Kaspar Becker
  - Executive: Regierungsrat (5)
  - Legislative: Landsgemeinde; Landrat (60)

Area
  - Total: 685.32 km^{2} (264.60 sq mi)

Population (December 2020)
  - Total: 40,851
  - Density: 59.609/km^{2} (154.39/sq mi)

GDP
  - Total: CHF 2.763 billion (2020)
  - Per capita: CHF 67,849 (2020)
- ISO 3166 code: CH-GL
- Highest point: 3,613 m (11,854 ft): Tödi
- Lowest point: 412 m (1,352 ft): Linth channel at border to St.Gallen
- Joined: 1352
- Languages: German
- Website: www.gl.ch

The canton of Glarus (German: Kanton Glarus [ˈɡlaːrʊs]; Romansh: Chantun Glaruna; French: Canton de Glaris; Italian: Canton Glarona) is a canton in east-central Switzerland. The capital is Glarus. The population speaks a variety of Alemannic German. The majority of the population (81%) identifies as Christian, about evenly split between Protestants and Catholics.

== History ==
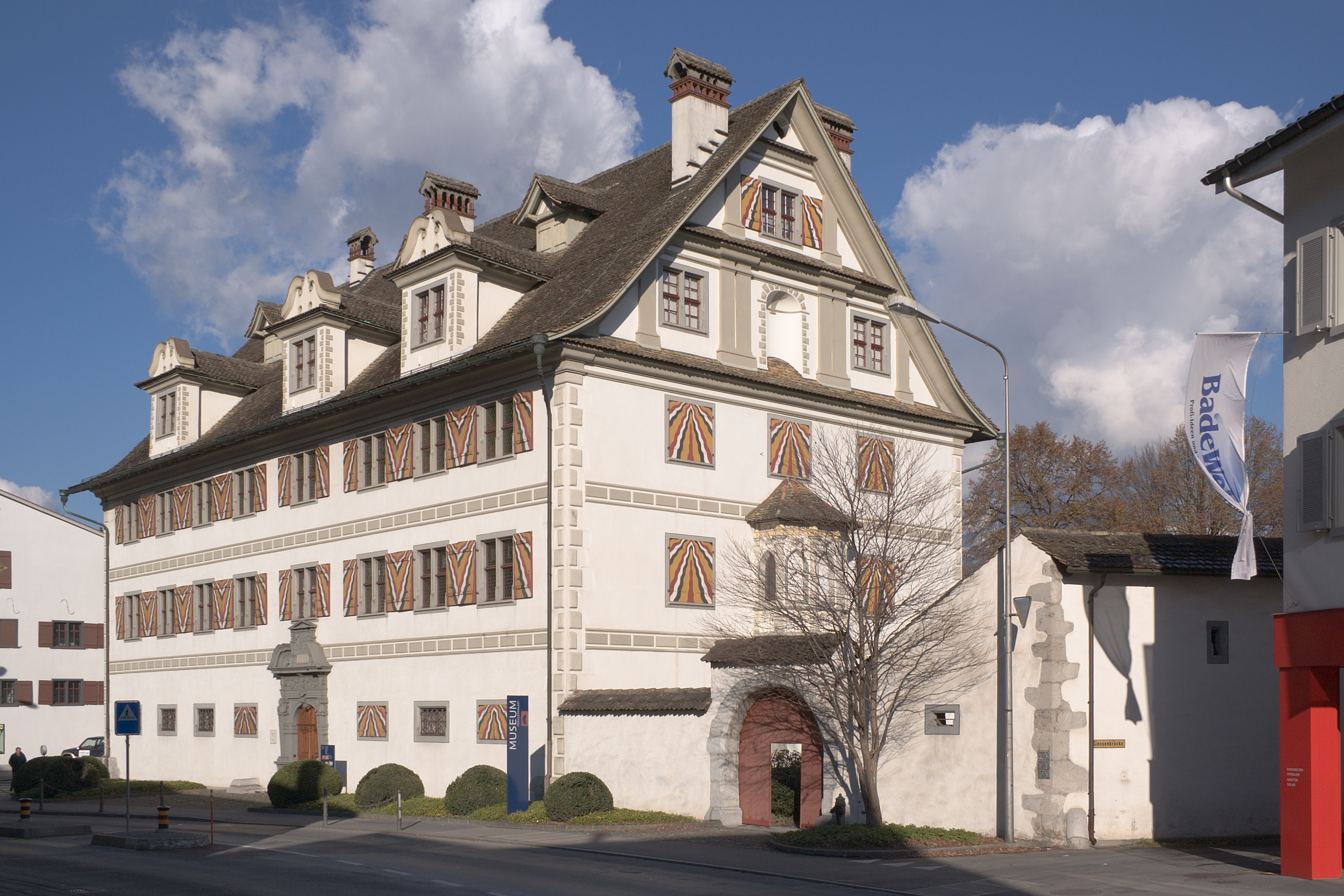
Cantonal museum in the Freulerpalast (Näfels)

According to legend, the inhabitants of the Linth Valley were converted to Christianity in the 6th century by the Irish monk Saint Fridolin, the founder of Säckingen Abbey in what is now the German state of Baden-Württemberg. From the 9th century, the area around Glarus was owned by Säckingen Abbey, the town of Glarus being recorded as Clarona. The Alemanni began to settle in the valley in the early 8th century. The Alemannic German language took hold only gradually and was dominant by the 11th century. By 1288, the Habsburgs had claimed all the abbey's rights.

Glarus joined the Old Swiss Confederacy in 1352 as one of the foundational eight cantons (Acht Orte) of the period of 1353–1481. The first recorded Landsgemeinde of Glarus took place in 1387. Habsburg's attempts to reconquer the valley were repelled in the Battle of Näfels of 1388. A banner depicting Saint Fridolin was used to rally the people of Glarus at that battle, and from that time, Glarus has used the image of Saint Fridolin on its flags and in its coat of arms.

The County of Werdenberg was annexed to Glarus in 1517. Between 1506 and 1516, the later reformer Huldrych Zwingli was a priest in Glarus, but Glarus remained Catholic, and by 1564, all of Zwingli's followers were eliminated. This, however, did not end the struggles between the Protestants and the Catholics in the area. To secure peace it was decided that each party should have its own assembly (Landsgemeinde) in 1623, and at a later stage in 1683, each side was granted the right to have its own tribunals.

Between 1798 and 1803, Glarus was part of the canton of Linth as established by Napoleon. In 1836 the constitution was adapted to unite the assemblies and establish a single Landsgemeinde.

In the early 1840s, after several years of failed crops and as food became scarce, much of the canton found itself deep in poverty. With more workers than available jobs, emigration to the United States of America was seen as a solution. The Glarus Emigration Society was established in 1844, which offered loans to help residents purchase land in the New World. Many of the resulting emigrants went to the state of Wisconsin, where they founded the town of New Glarus.

On 6 May 2007, Glarus became the first Swiss canton to lower the voting age to 16.

== Geography ==
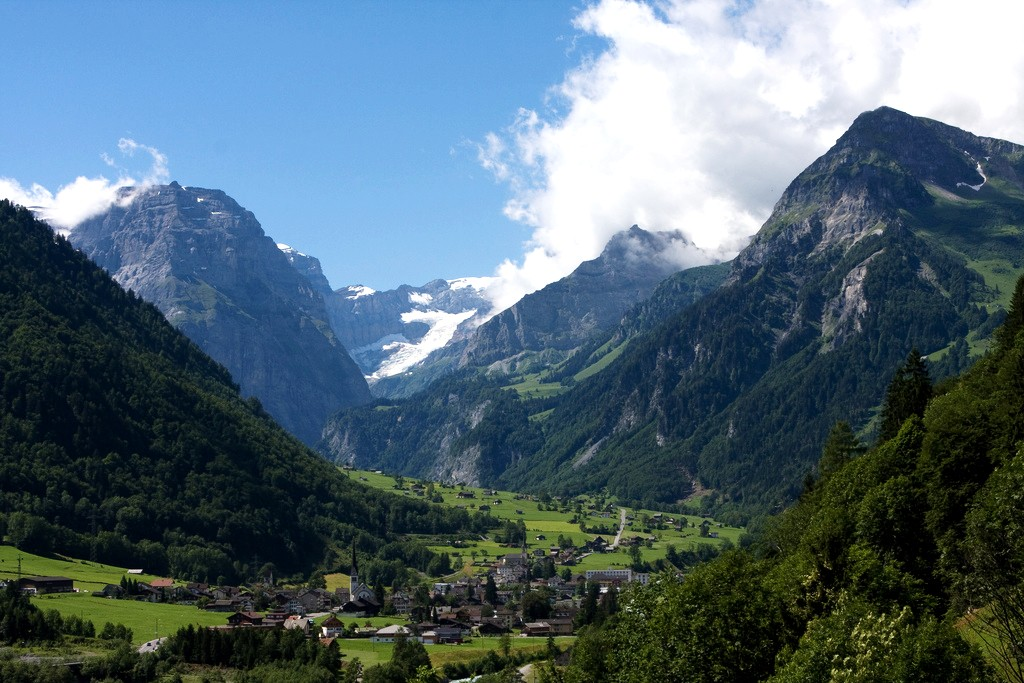
Linthal and Glarus Alps

The canton of Glarus is dominated by the deep valley of the Linth River and the smaller Sernftal on the east. Most of the area is mountainous. The highest peak in the Glarus Alps is the Tödi at 3,614 meters (11,857 ft). Other mountains include the Hausstock (3,158 meters (10,361 ft)) and the Glärnisch (2,910 meters (9,550 ft)). The canton contains part of a thrust fault that was declared a geologic UNESCO World Heritage Site, under the name Swiss Tectonic Arena Sardona, in 2008. Famous outcrops in the Swiss Tectonic Arena Sardona include those at Lochsite near Glarus and in a mountain cliff called Tschingelhörner between Elm and Flims (in the same cliff is a natural hole called the Martinsloch). There is also a large lake called Walensee (Lake Walen) on the north. The total area of the canton of Glarus is 685 square kilometers (264 sq mi), of which about half is considered productive. Forestry is an important branch of industry in the canton.

== Municipalities ==
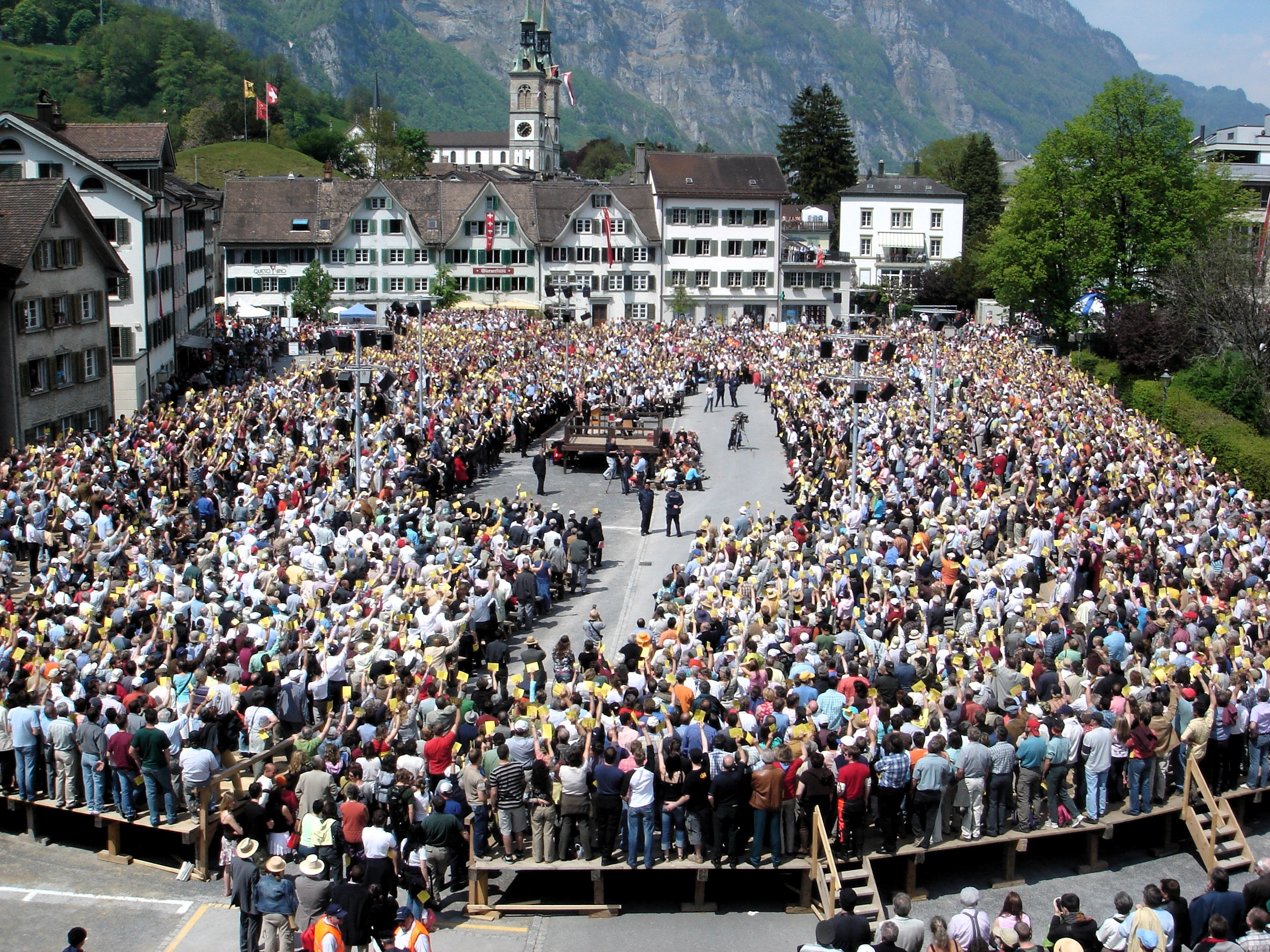
Landsgemeinde of 7 May 2006.

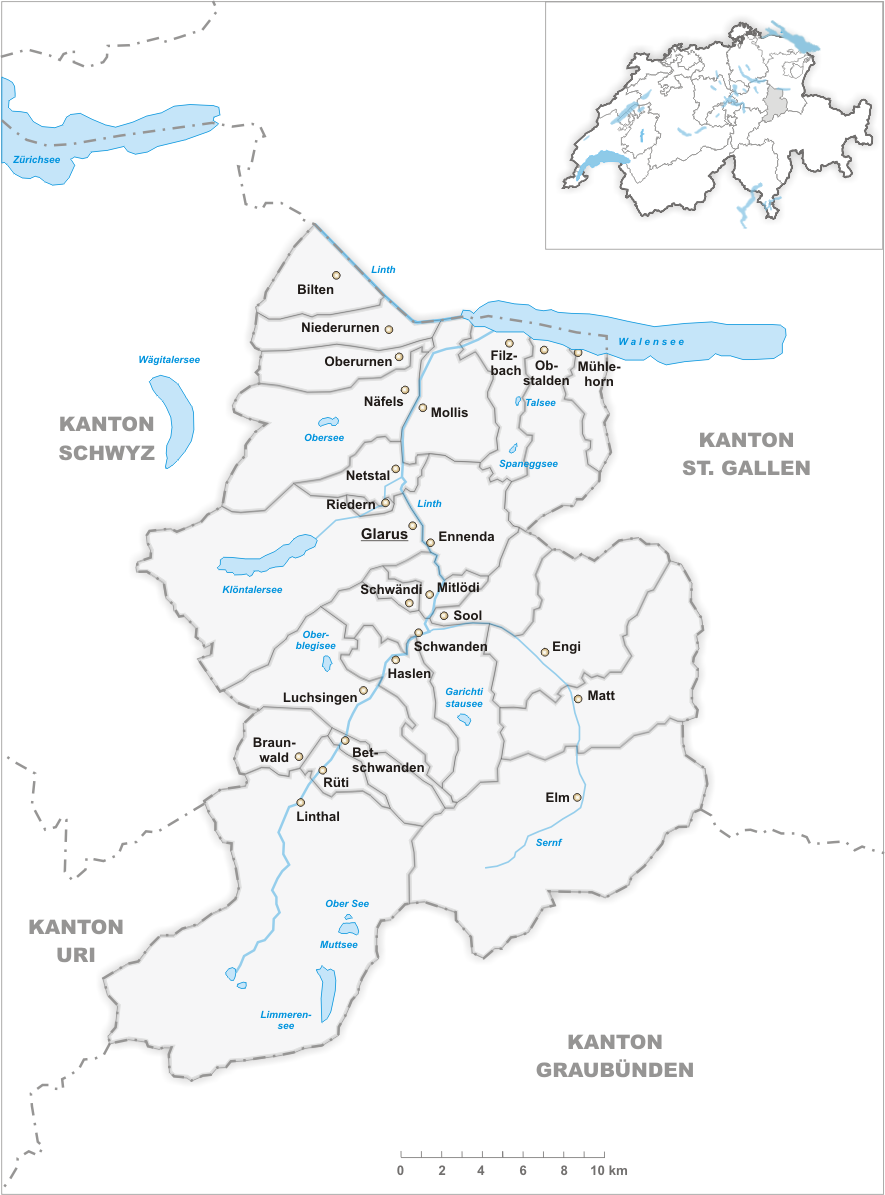
Municipalities before the reform (2007)

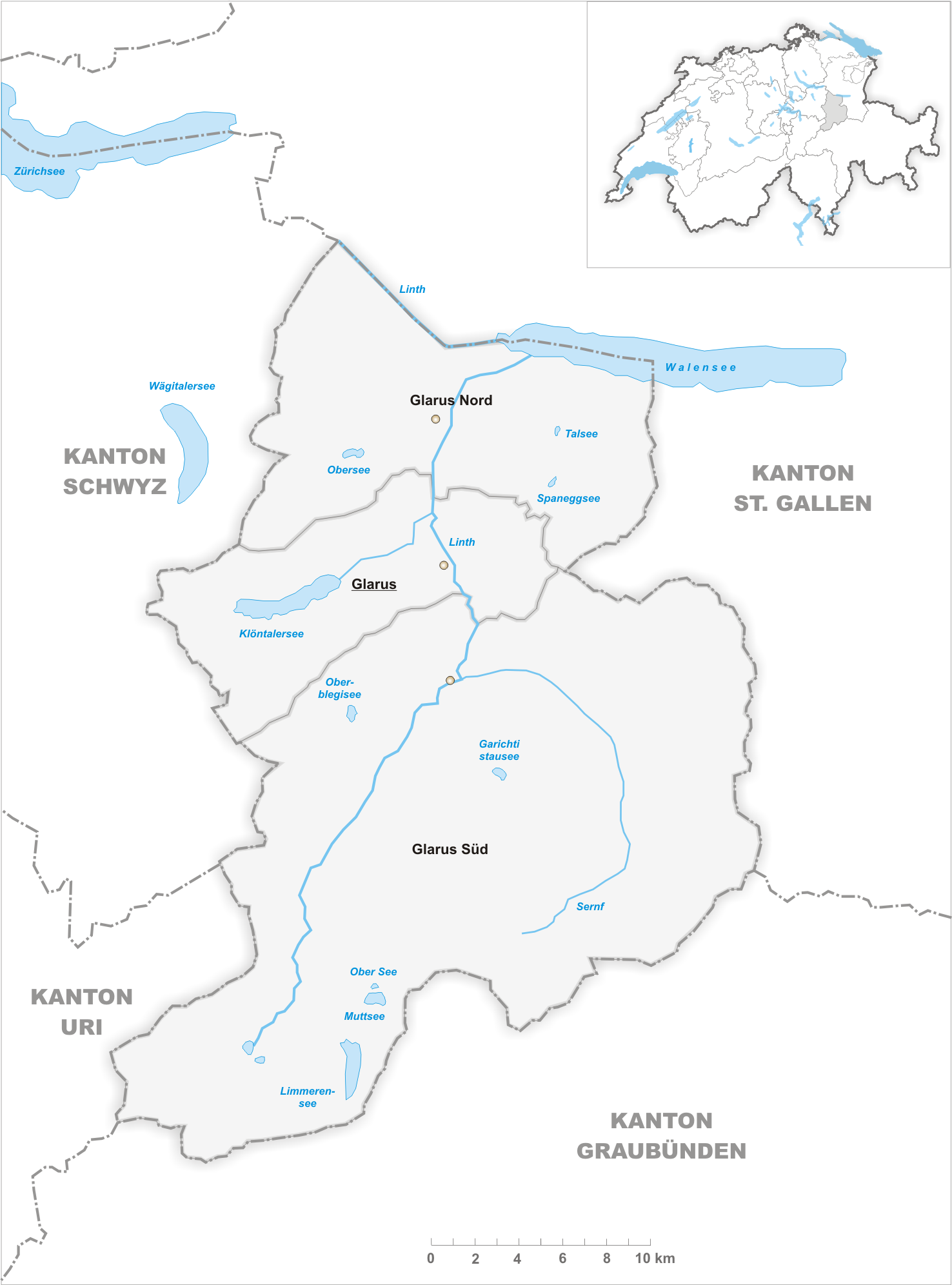
Municipalities after the reform (2011)

The Landsgemeinde (cantonal assembly) of 2006 decided that the 25 municipalities of Glarus be consolidated to three, effective 1 January 2011.

- The new municipality of Glarus subsumed the former municipalities of Glarus, Ennenda, Netstal and Riedern.
- Glarus Nord subsumed Bilten, Filzbach, Mollis, Mühlehorn, Näfels, Niederurnen, Oberurnen and Obstalden.
- Glarus Süd subsumed Betschwanden, Braunwald, Elm, Engi, Haslen (including Leuggelbach and Nidfurn), Linthal, Luchsingen (including Diesbach and Hätzingen), Matt, Mitlödi, Rüti, Schwanden, Schwändi and Sool.

== Demographics ==
The population of the canton (as of 31 December 2020) is 40,851. As of 2007, the population included 7,314 foreigners (or 19.13% of the total population).

The population (as of 2000) is nearly evenly split between Protestants (44%) and Roman Catholics (37%).

83.6% is German-speaking and 6.8% is Italian-speaking.

=== Historical population ===
The historical population is given in the following table:

Historic Population Data
Year	Total Population	Swiss	Non-Swiss	Population share of total country
1850	30,213	29 965	248	1.3%
1880	34,242	33 175	1 038	1.2%
1900	32,349	30 801	1 548	1.0%
1950	37,663	34 726	2 937	0.8%
1970	38,155	31 321	6 834	0.6%
2000	38,183	30 251	7 932	0.5%
2020	40,851			0.5%

== Economy ==
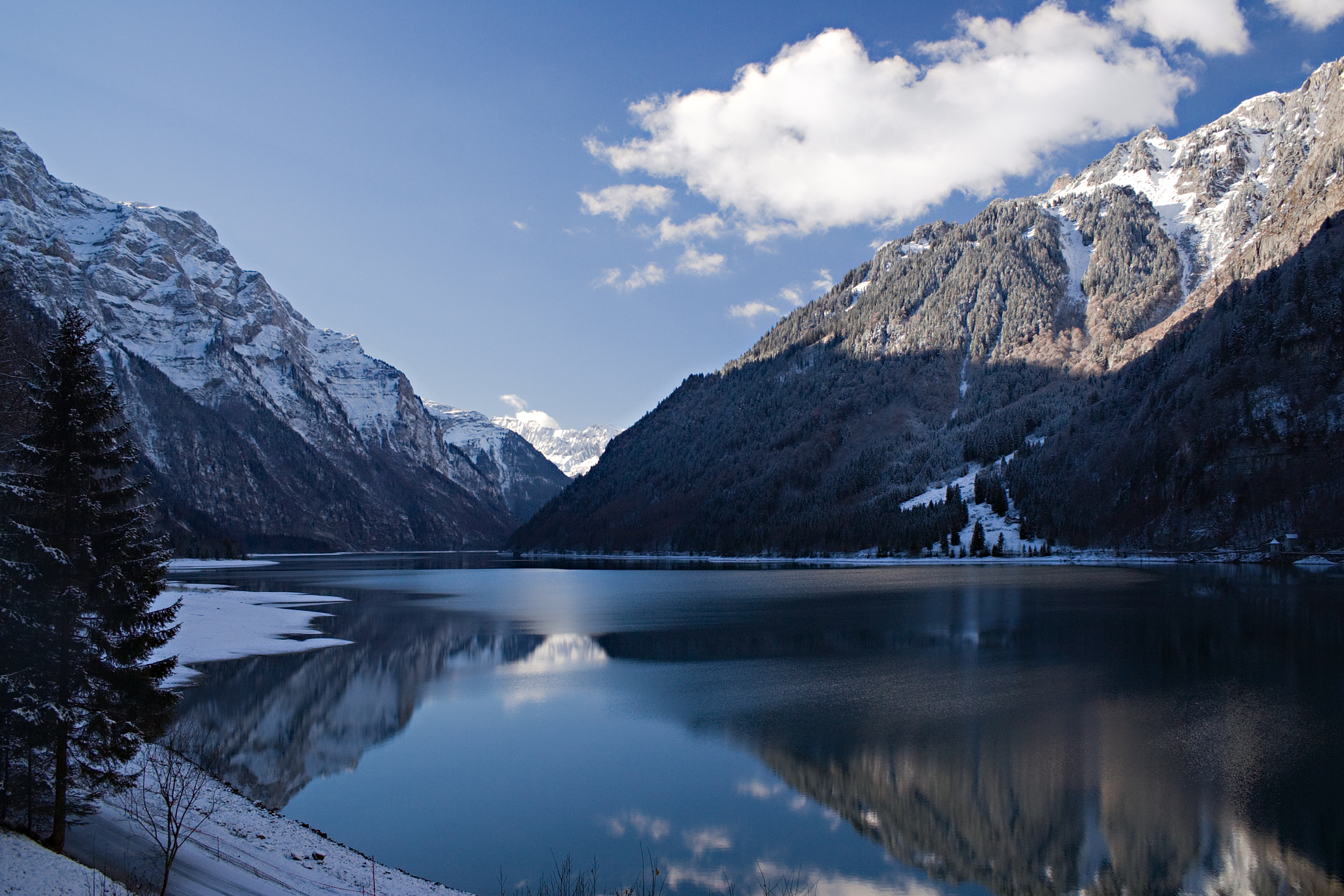
Electrical power from Klöntalersee is one of the canton's main export services.

The canton's geography helped establish slate works in the 17th century. The mountainous surroundings of Glarus also served as an advantage in industrialisation. Cotton spinning was important in the 18th century, complementing traditional woollen spinning. Industrialisation also brought cotton printing, hydroelectric plants, metal and machinery factories, and paper mills.

In 2014, about 5% of the workers in Glarus worked in the primary sector (the total for all of Switzerland is 3.3%). Of these 5%, in 2008, nearly three-quarters were involved in dairy farming and cattle breeding. In 2014 the secondary sector employed 8,322 or about 38.2% of the total, which is much higher than 21.8% for the entire country. Over one-quarter of those in the secondary sector worked in the construction industry. The tertiary sector employed 12,366, or about 56.8% of the total, almost 18% lower than 74.9% nationwide. Of those in the tertiary sector, 11.72% work in retail shops and 10.37% are in health care.

== Transport ==
The main railway lines are the Ziegelbrücke–Linthal, Ziegelbrücke–Sargans (Kerenzerberg Rail Tunnel), and Zurich–Ziegelbrücke/Näfels railway lines. Between 1905 and 1969, the Sernftal tramway operated between Schwanden and Elm.

Regional rail within the canton of Glarus and neighbouring areas is provided by St. Gallen S-Bahn and Zurich S-Bahn (the S27 rush-hour service is part of neither network). Ziegelbrücke, located just outside the cantonal border, is an important nodal station in the region, served also by long distance InterRegio trains. PostAuto, Sernftalbus and other bus operators serve towns and villages within the canton. Rail and bus services operate within the Ostwind tariff network.

Several cable cars and a funicular provide access to mountains.

The Schiffsbetrieb Walensee operates boat cruises on Walensee, serving all lakeside settlements. The only landing stage in the canton of Glarus is in Mühlehorn.

The nearest airport is Zurich Airport.

The northern part of the canton is traversed by the A3 motorway (Kerenzerberg Road Tunnel). Mountain passes are the Foo Pass, Kerenzerberg Pass, Kisten Pass, Klausen Pass, Panix Pass, Pragel Pass, Richetli Pass, and Riseten Pass.

== Politics ==
=== Federal election results ===
Percentage of the total vote per party in the canton in the Federal Elections 1971-2019
Party	Ideology	1971	1975	1979	1983	1987	1991	1995	1999	2003	2007	2011	2015	2019
FDP.The Liberals^{a}	Classical liberalism	42.4	* ^{b}	*	*	*	*	*	*	*	*	*	*	*
SP/PS	Social democracy	57.2	64.7	*	*	*	53.7	83.9	85.7	67.1	55.5	24.6	45.0	28.2
SVP/UDC	Swiss nationalism	*	*	81.8	92.3	85.6	42.8	*	*	*	35.1	*	*	*
BDP/PBD	Fiscal conservatism	*	*	*	*	*	*	*	*	*	*	61.7	51.5	63.0
GPS/PES	Green politics	*	*	*	*	*	*	*	*	*	*	*	*	2.7
Other		0.4	35.3	18.2	7.7	14.4	3.5	16.1	14.3	32.9	9.4	13.7	3.5	6.0
Voter participation %		61.7	33.4	35.4	26.3	22.7	41.8	24.5	28.2	25.3	32.6	34.2	41.5	39.9

^a FDP before 2009, FDP.The Liberals after 2009
^b "*" indicates that the party was not on the ballot in this canton.

== See also ==
- Landsgemeinde
