= Oberurnen =

- Former municipality
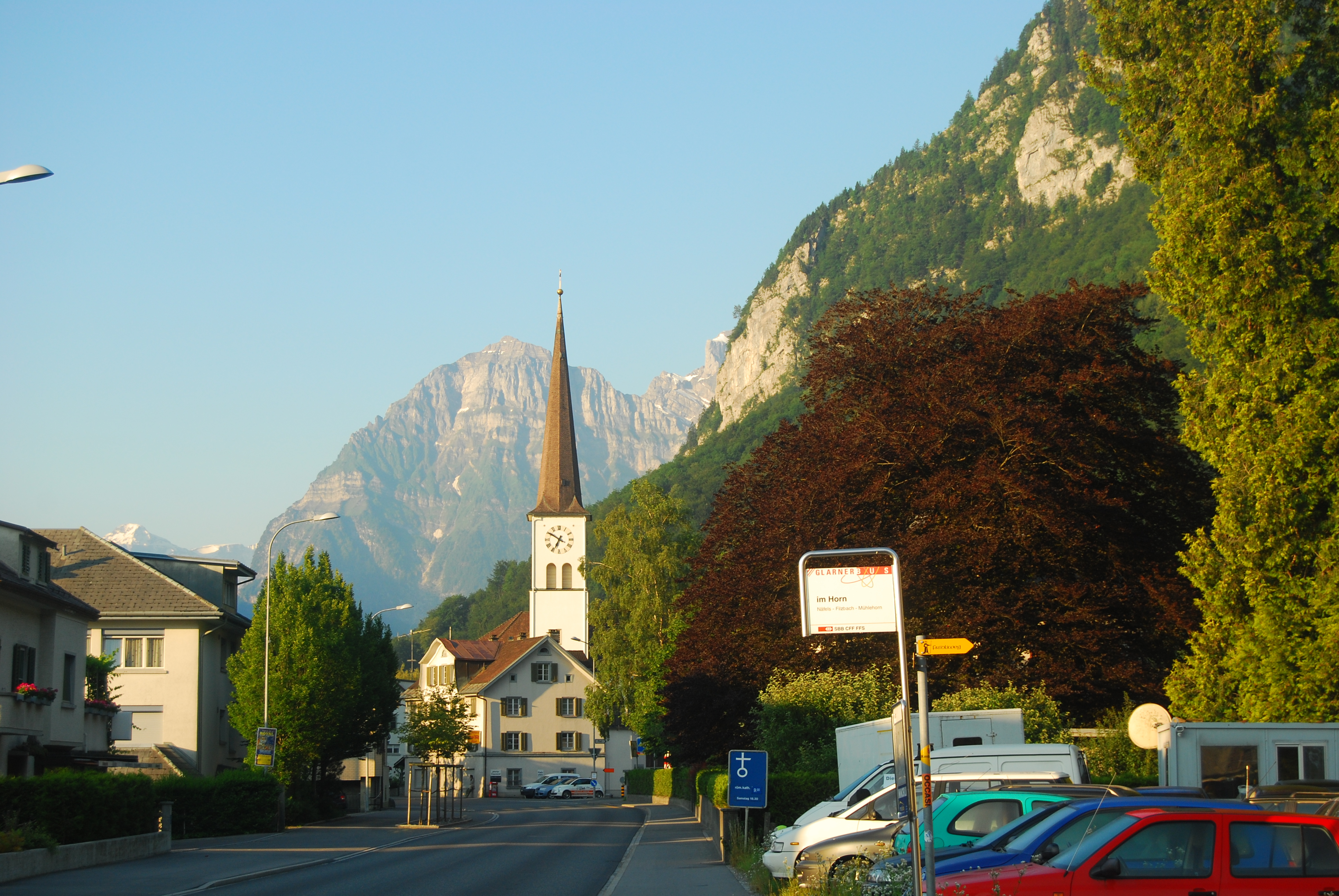

- Coat of arms
- Location of Oberurnen
- Location within Switzerland Location within Canton of Glarus
- Coordinates: 47°6′N 9°3′E
- Country: Switzerland
- Canton: Glarus
- District: n.a.

Area
  - Total: 12.82 km^{2} (4.95 sq mi)
- Elevation: 430 m (1,410 ft)

Population (December 2020)
  - Total: 1,963
  - Density: 153.1/km^{2} (396.6/sq mi)
- Time zone: UTC+01:00 (CET)
  - Summer (DST): UTC+02:00 (CEST)
- Postal code: 8868
- SFOS number: 1623
- ISO 3166 code: CH-GL
- Surrounded by: Innerthal (SZ), Mollis, Näfels, Niederurnen, Schübelbach (SZ)
- Website: www.oberurnen.ch

Oberurnen is a former municipality in the canton of Glarus in Switzerland. Effective from 1 January 2011, Oberurnen is part of the municipality of Glarus Nord.

== History ==
Oberurnen is first mentioned in 1340 as Obern Urannen.

== Geography ==
Oberurnen has an area, as of 2006, of 12.8 km^{2} (4.9 sq mi). Of this area, 45.2% is used for agricultural purposes, while 40.6% is forested. Of the rest of the land, 4.1% is settled (buildings or roads) and the remainder (10.2%) is non-productive (rivers, glaciers or mountains).

Oberurnen is located in the Glarner Unterland.

== Demographics ==
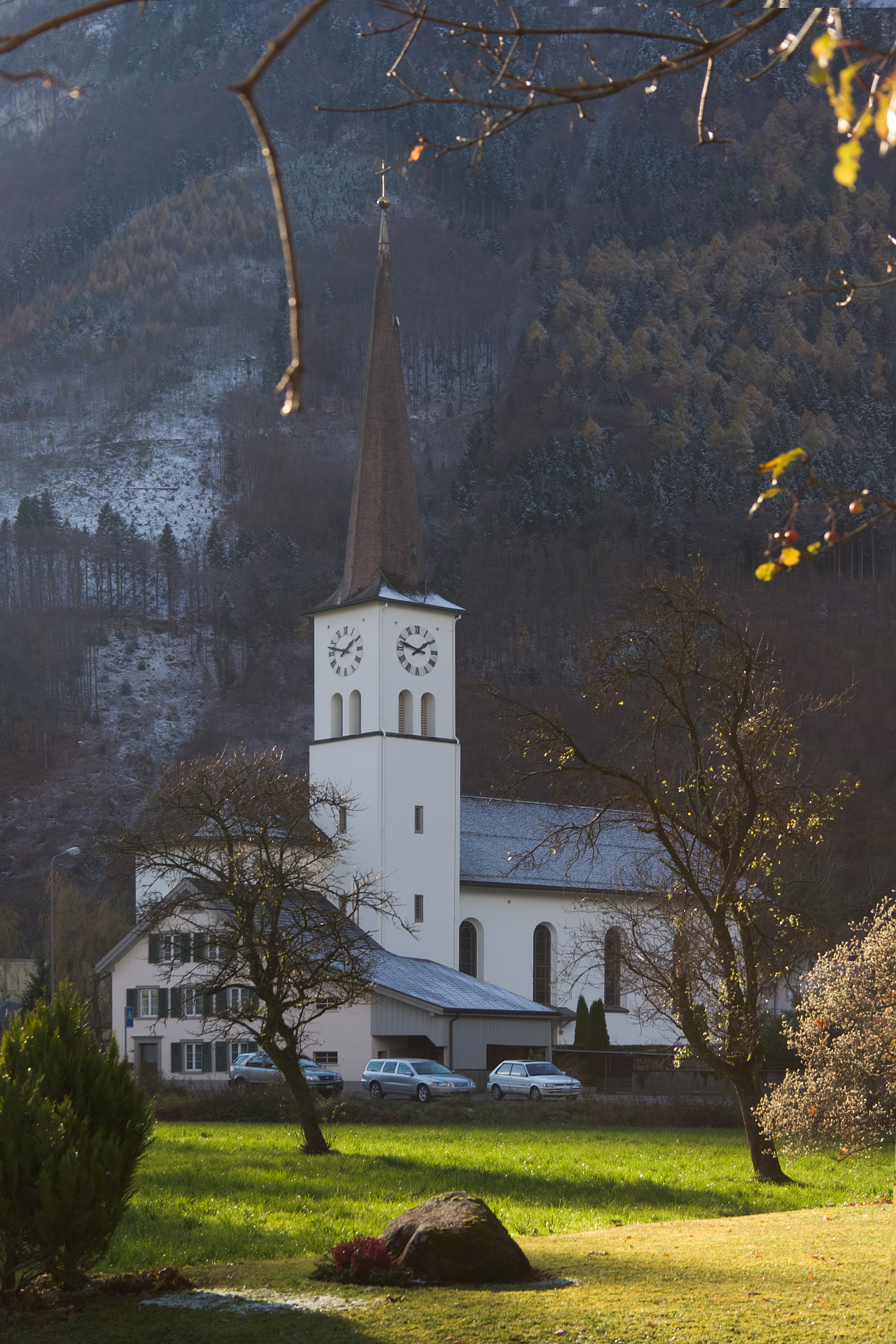
Oberurnen Catholic Church

Aerial view from 800 m by Walter Mittelholzer (1919)

Oberurnen has a population (as of 2010) of 1,963. As of 2007, 24.2% of the population was made up of foreign nationals. Over the last 10 years the population has grown at a rate of 0.5%. Most of the population (as of 2000) speaks German (79.8%), with Italian being second most common ( 8.2%) and Albanian being third ( 3.6%).

In the 2007 federal election the most popular party was the SPS which received 44.9% of the vote. Most of the rest of the votes went to the SVP with 44.2% of the vote.

In Oberurnen about 56.9% of the population (between age 25-64) have completed either non-mandatory upper secondary education or additional higher education (either University or a Fachhochschule).

Oberurnen has an unemployment rate of 2.5%. As of 2005, there were 53 people employed in the primary economic sector and about 21 businesses involved in this sector. 82 people are employed in the secondary sector and there are 19 businesses in this sector. 129 people are employed in the tertiary sector, with 42 businesses in this sector.

The historical population is given in the following table:

year	population
1850	691
1900	862
1950	1,181
2000	1,811

== Transport ==
Nieder- und Oberurnen railway station is on the Weesen to Linthal railway line. It is served by the Zürich S-Bahn service S25 between Linthal and Zürich, and by the St. Gallen S-Bahn service S6 between Rapperswil and Schwanden. As of the December 2023 timetable change, both services operate once per hour, combining to provide two trains per hour between Ziegelbrücke and Schwanden.
