= Mühlehorn =

- Former municipality
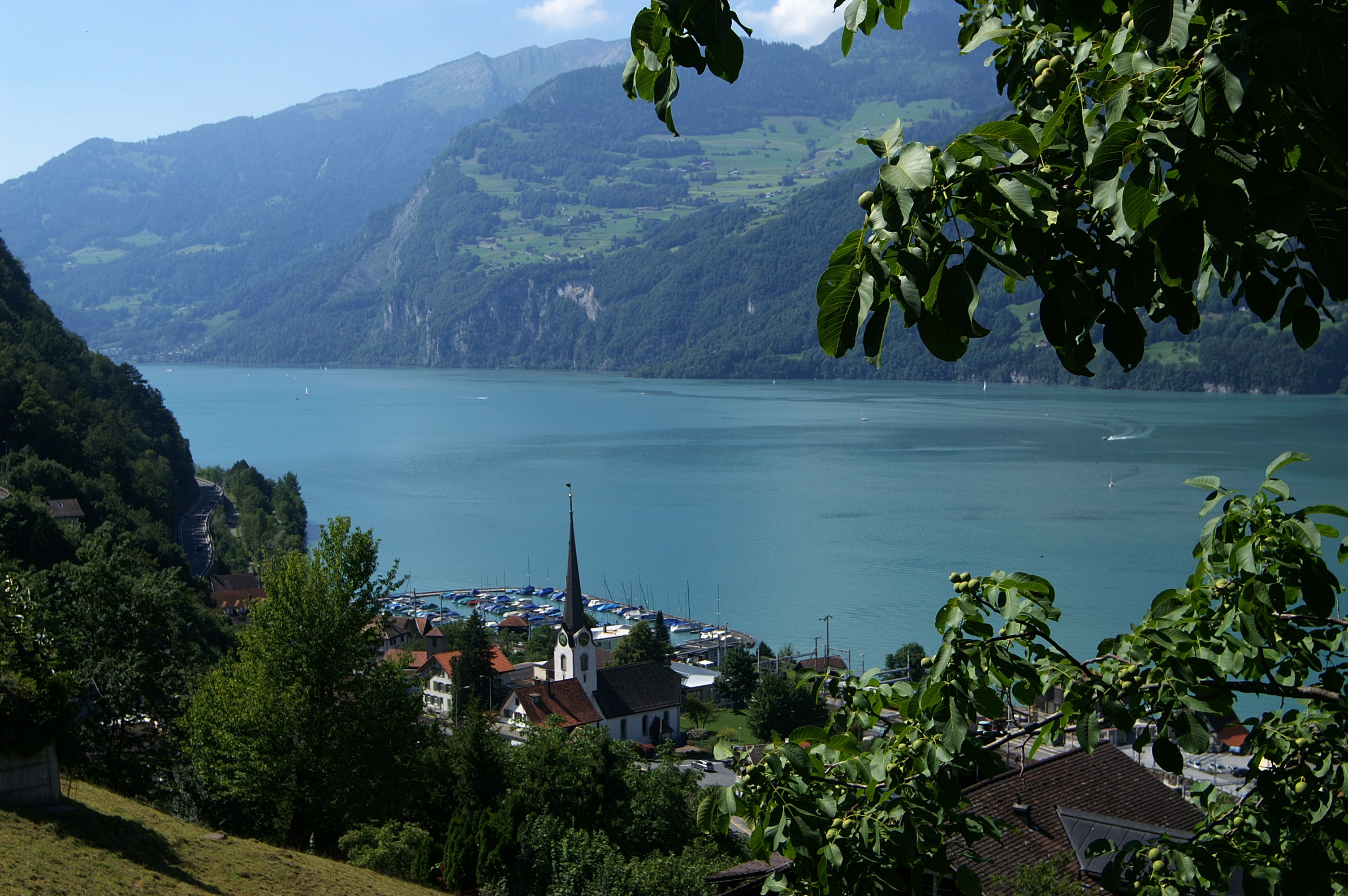

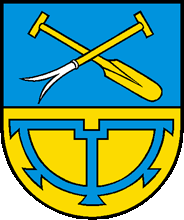
- Coat of arms
- Location of Mühlehorn
- Location within Switzerland Location within Canton of Glarus
- Coordinates: 47°7′N 9°10′E
- Country: Switzerland
- Canton: Glarus

Area
  - Total: 7.75 km^{2} (2.99 sq mi)
- Elevation: 428 m (1,404 ft)

Population (December 2020)
  - Total: 416
  - Density: 53.7/km^{2} (139/sq mi)
- Time zone: UTC+01:00 (CET)
  - Summer (DST): UTC+02:00 (CEST)
- Postal code: 8874
- SFOS number: 1618
- ISO 3166 code: CH-GL
- Surrounded by: Amden (SG), Obstalden, Quarten (SG)
- Website: www.muehlehorn.ch

Mühlehorn is a former municipality in the canton of Glarus, Switzerland, located on Lake Walen (Walensee). Effective from 1 January 2011, Mühlehorn is part of the municipality of Glarus Nord.

== History ==
Mühlehorn is first mentioned in 1551 as Mülihorn.

== Geography ==
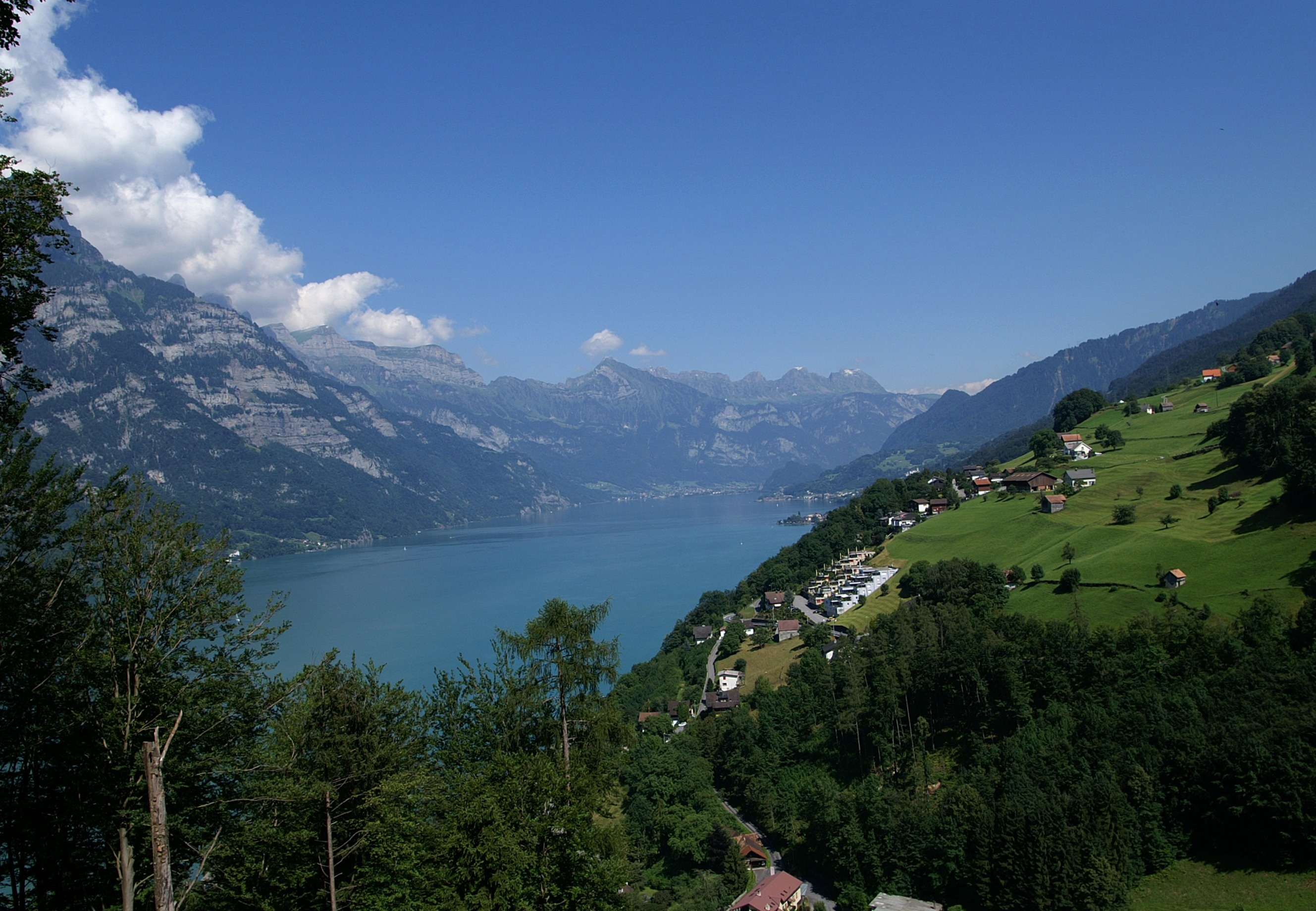
Mühlehorn at Walensee

Aerial view from 300 m (980 ft) by Walter Mittelholzer (1919)

Mühlehorn has an area, as of 2006, of 7.8 km^{2} (3.0 sq mi). Of this area, 33.8% is used for agricultural purposes, while 52.4% is forested. Of the rest of the land, 3.9% is settled (buildings or roads) and the remainder (9.9%) is non-productive (rivers, glaciers or mountains).

Mühlehorn is located on the southern shore of the Walensee. It consists of the village of Mühlehorn and the hamlets of Vortobel, Tiefenwinkel and Mühletal which are on the north-east border of the canton. It lies north of the Mürtschenstock massif.

== Demographics ==
Mühlehorn had a population (as of 2010) of 416. As of 2007, 13.4% of the population was made up of foreign nationals. Over the last 10 years, the population has decreased at a rate of -13.2%. Most of the population (as of 2000) speaks German (88.9%), with Serbo-Croatian being second most common (7.9%) and Italian being third (1.1%).

During the 2007 federal election, the most popular party was the SPS which received 54% of the vote. Most of the rest of the votes went to the SVP with 31% of the vote.

In Mühlehorn about 67.3% of the population (between age 25-64) have completed either non-mandatory upper secondary education or additional higher education (either University or a Fachhochschule).

Mühlehorn has an unemployment rate of 0.71%. As of 2005, there were 17 people employed in the primary economic sector and about 7 businesses involved in this sector. 88 people are employed in the secondary sector and there are 9 businesses in this sector. 38 people are employed in the tertiary sector, with 13 businesses in this sector.

The historical population is given in the following table:

Year	Population	Percent Change
1888	538	
1900	531	-1.30%
1950	631	18.83%
2000	441	-30.11%

== Transport ==
The municipality is located on the A3 motorway (Kerenzerberg Road Tunnel).

Mühlehorn railway station, located on the Ziegelbrücke–Sargans railway line, is served by the S17 regional train of St. Gallen S-Bahn. Mühlehorn lies east of the eastern portal of the Kerenzerberg Rail Tunnel.

There is a landing stage served by the Schiffsbetrieb Walensee, which operates boat cruises on the lake.
