= Obstalden =

- Former municipality
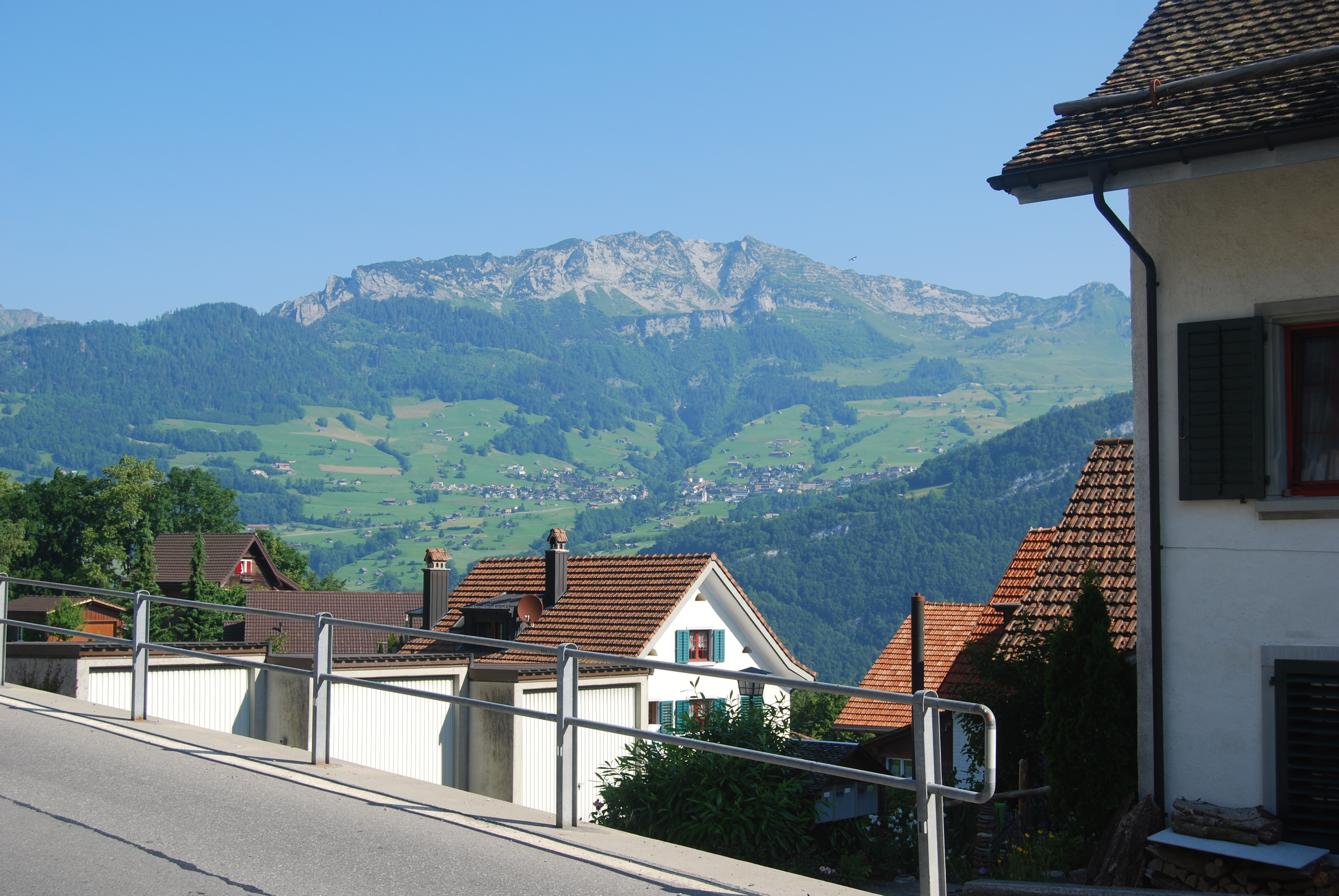

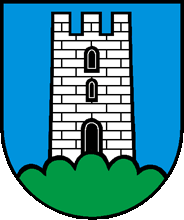
- Coat of arms
- Location of Obstalden
- Location within Switzerland Location within Canton of Glarus
- Coordinates: 47°07′N 9°09′E
- Country: Switzerland
- Canton: Glarus
- District: n.a.

Area
  - Total: 23.76 km^{2} (9.17 sq mi)
- Elevation: 685 m (2,247 ft)

Population (December 2020)
  - Total: 443
  - Density: 18.6/km^{2} (48.3/sq mi)
- Time zone: UTC+01:00 (CET)
  - Summer (DST): UTC+02:00 (CEST)
- Postal code: 8758
- SFOS number: 1624
- ISO 3166 code: CH-GL
- Surrounded by: Amden (SG), Ennenda, Filzbach, Mühlehorn, Quarten (SG), Sool
- Website: www.obstalden.ch

Obstalden is a former municipality in the canton of Glarus in Switzerland. Effective from 1 January 2011, Obstalden is part of the municipality of Glarus Nord.

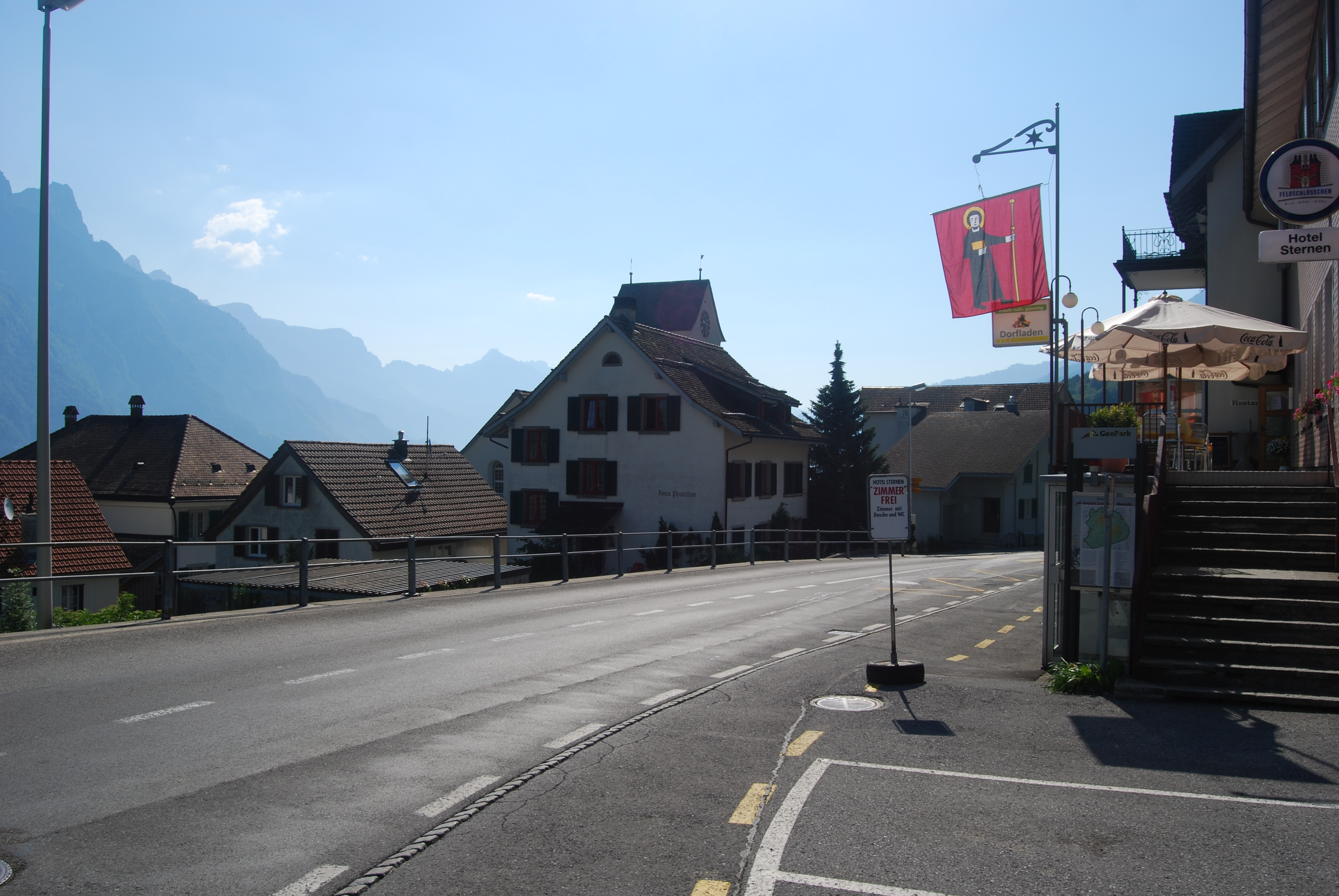
Obstalden

== History ==
Obstalden is first mentioned in 1310.

== Geography ==
Aerial view from 2000 m by Walter Mittelholzer (1922)

Obstalden has an area, as of 2006, of 23.8 km^{2} (9.2 sq mi). Of this area, 37.6% is used for agricultural purposes, while 26% is forested. Of the rest of the land, 1.2% is settled (buildings or roads) and the remainder (35.2%) is non-productive (rivers, glaciers or mountains).

It consists of the village of Obstalden and the hamlets of Mülital, Voglingen, Nidstalden, Stocken and Walenguflen.

== Demographics ==
Obstalden had a population (as of 2010) of 443. As of 2007, 9.0% of the population was made up of foreign nationals. Over the last 10 years the population has grown at a rate of 3.9%. Most of the population (as of 2000) speaks German (97.0%), with French being second most common ( 0.7%) and Italian being third ( 0.2%).

In the 2007 federal election the most popular party was the SPS which received 50.8% of the vote. Most of the rest of the votes went to the SVP with 45.2% of the vote.

The entire Swiss population is generally well educated. In Obstalden about 70.1% of the population (between age 25–64) have completed either non-mandatory upper secondary education or additional higher education (either University or a Fachhochschule).

Obstalden has an unemployment rate of 1.23%. As of 2005, there were 53 people employed in the primary economic sector and about 21 businesses involved in this sector. 10 people are employed in the secondary sector and there are 6 businesses in this sector. 41 people are employed in the tertiary sector, with 12 businesses in this sector.

The historical population is given in the following table:

| year | population |
|---|---|
| 1888 | 489 |
| 1900 | 472 |
| 1950 | 497 |
| 2000 | 434 |

== Weather ==
Obstalden has an average of 148.6 days of rain per year and on average receives 1,699 mm (66.9 in) of precipitation. The wettest month is August during which time Obstalden receives an average of 205 mm (8.1 in) of precipitation. During this month there is precipitation for an average of 14.2 days. The month with the most days of precipitation is June, with an average of 15.2, but with only 203 mm (8.0 in) of precipitation. The driest month of the year is January with an average of 106 mm (4.2 in) of precipitation over 14.2 days.
