= Standard Textile Company =

- Industry: Textile
- Founded: 1940
- Founders: Charles Heiman
- Headquarters: Cincinnati, Ohio, U.S.
- Website: www.standardtextile.com

Standard Textile Company, Inc. is a vertically integrated technology-based textile business. It develops, manufactures, and distributes multiple-use textiles, including high-end luxury terry, sheets, blankets, window treatments, upholstery fabrics, uniforms, workwear, and napery. The company is based in Cincinnati, Ohio, and is privately held. The company employs over 4,000 persons and has estimated sales of $620 million.

Standard Textile was founded in 1940 by Charles Heiman, a German immigrant who began a small linen distribution company in his Cincinnati apartment. His son, Paul Heiman, expanded the company across the United States. Today the company is led by President and CEO Gary Heiman, and has operations in North America, Europe, the Middle East, and the Far East.

Standard Textile has 24 production and distribution facilities around the world and serves more than 55 global markets. It manages its own research and development operations, global manufacturing facilities, and worldwide distribution network. The company has invested heavily in clean energy, water conservation, recycling, and engineering to extend product life. Standard Textile is a Disaster Responder Program member of the American Red Cross.

Announced in November 2018, Standard Textile acquired the global hospitality business of Mascioni SPA of Italy, including the Mascioni Hotel Collection brand.

In December 2018, Standard Textile Home, the company's first retail division launched online.

Standard Textile was named a 2021 honoree in the US Best Managed Companies program, sponsored by Deloitte Private and The Wall Street Journal. In June, 2022, Standard was given the distinction of 2-year honoree for receiving the award again for 2022.
