= Amden =

- Municipality
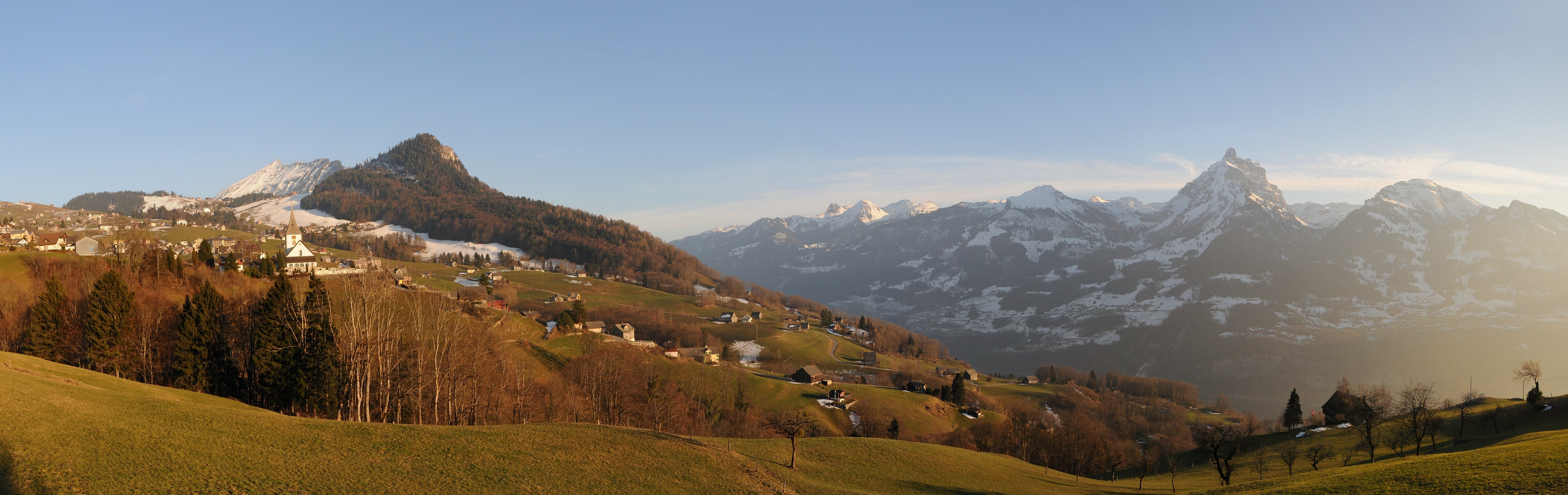

- Coat of arms
- Location of Amden
- Location within Switzerland Location within Canton of St. Gallen
- Coordinates: 47°8′N 9°8′E
- Country: Switzerland
- Canton: St. Gallen
- District: See-Gaster

Area
  - Total: 43.48 km^{2} (16.79 sq mi)
- Elevation: 999 m (3,278 ft)

Population (December 2020)
  - Total: 1,876
  - Density: 43.15/km^{2} (111.7/sq mi)
- Time zone: UTC+01:00 (CET)
  - Summer (DST): UTC+02:00 (CEST)
- Postal code: 8873
- SFOS number: 3311
- ISO 3166 code: CH-SG
- Surrounded by: Alt Sankt Johann, Ebnat-Kappel, Filzbach (GL), Mühlehorn (GL), Nesslau-Krummenau, Obstalden (GL), Quarten, Schänis, Stein, Weesen
- Website: gemeinde-amden.ch

Amden is a municipality in the Wahlkreis (constituency) of See-Gaster, in the canton of St. Gallen in Switzerland.

== History ==
Amden is first mentioned in 1178 as Andimo monte Voraden. In 1230 it was mentioned as Andimin, in 1282 as in montibus Andinen and later as Ammon.

== Geography ==
Aerial view from 500 m by Walter Mittelholzer (1923)

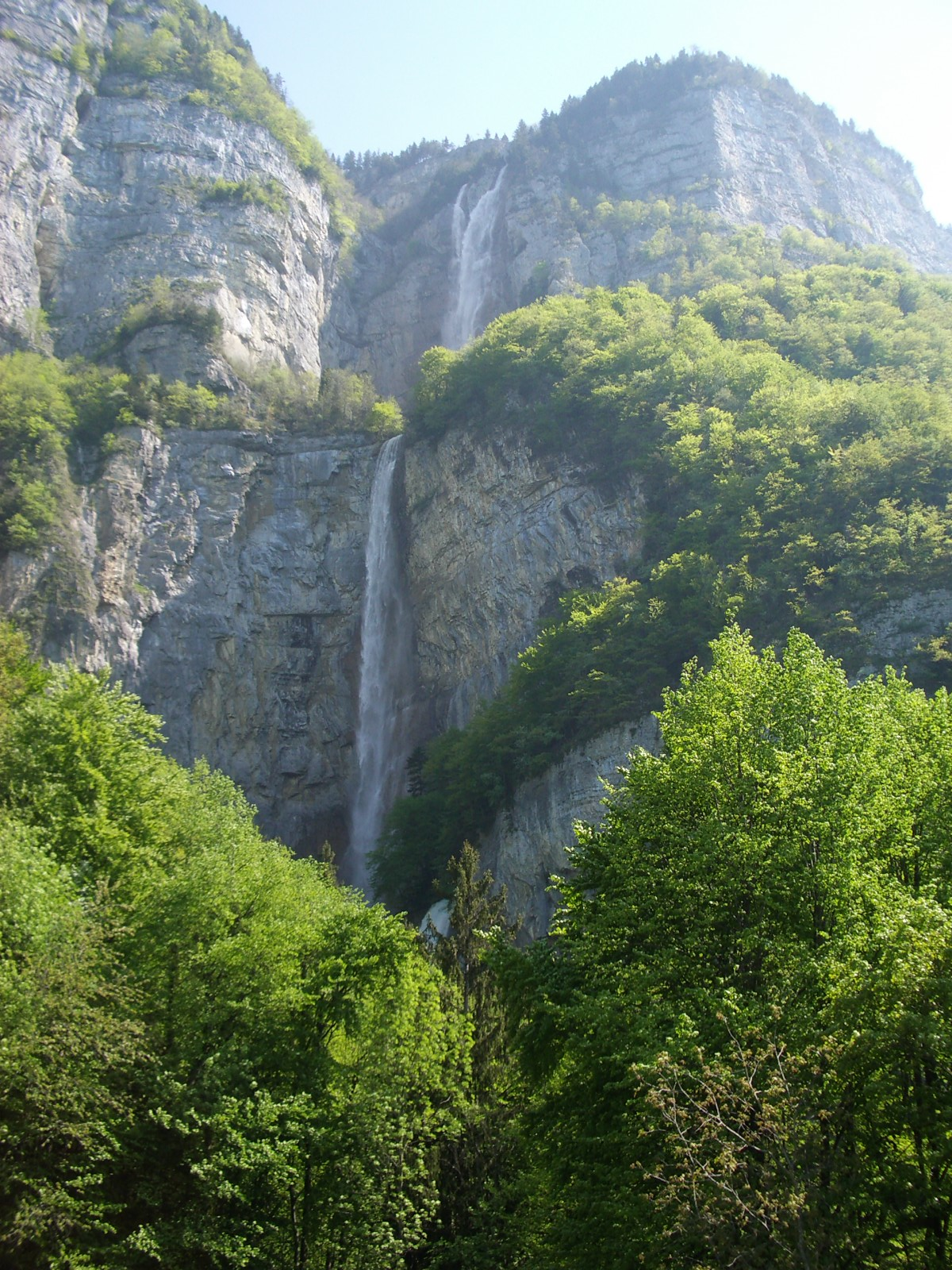
Seerenbach waterfalls

Amden has an area, as of 2006, of 43 km^{2} (17 sq mi). Of this area, 38.9% is used for agricultural purposes, while 48.2% is forested. Of the rest of the land, 2.7% is settled (buildings or roads) and the remainder (10.3%) is non-productive (rivers or lakes).

The municipality is located in the See-Gaster Wahlkreis. It is located on a terrace above the north shore of the Walensee. The municipality is a mixture of tourist and alpine pasture villages. It consists of the village of Amden (908 m (2,979 ft)) and the hamlets of Fli and Betlis (419 m (1,375 ft)) as well as the vacation village and ski resort of Arvenbüel (1,259 m (4,131 ft)).

The middle of the three Seerenbach Falls is the highest waterfall in Switzerland (302 m (991 ft)).

== Coat of arms ==
The blazon of the municipal coat of arms is Per fess Argent a Lion passant Gules and Azure a Crown Or.

== Demographics ==
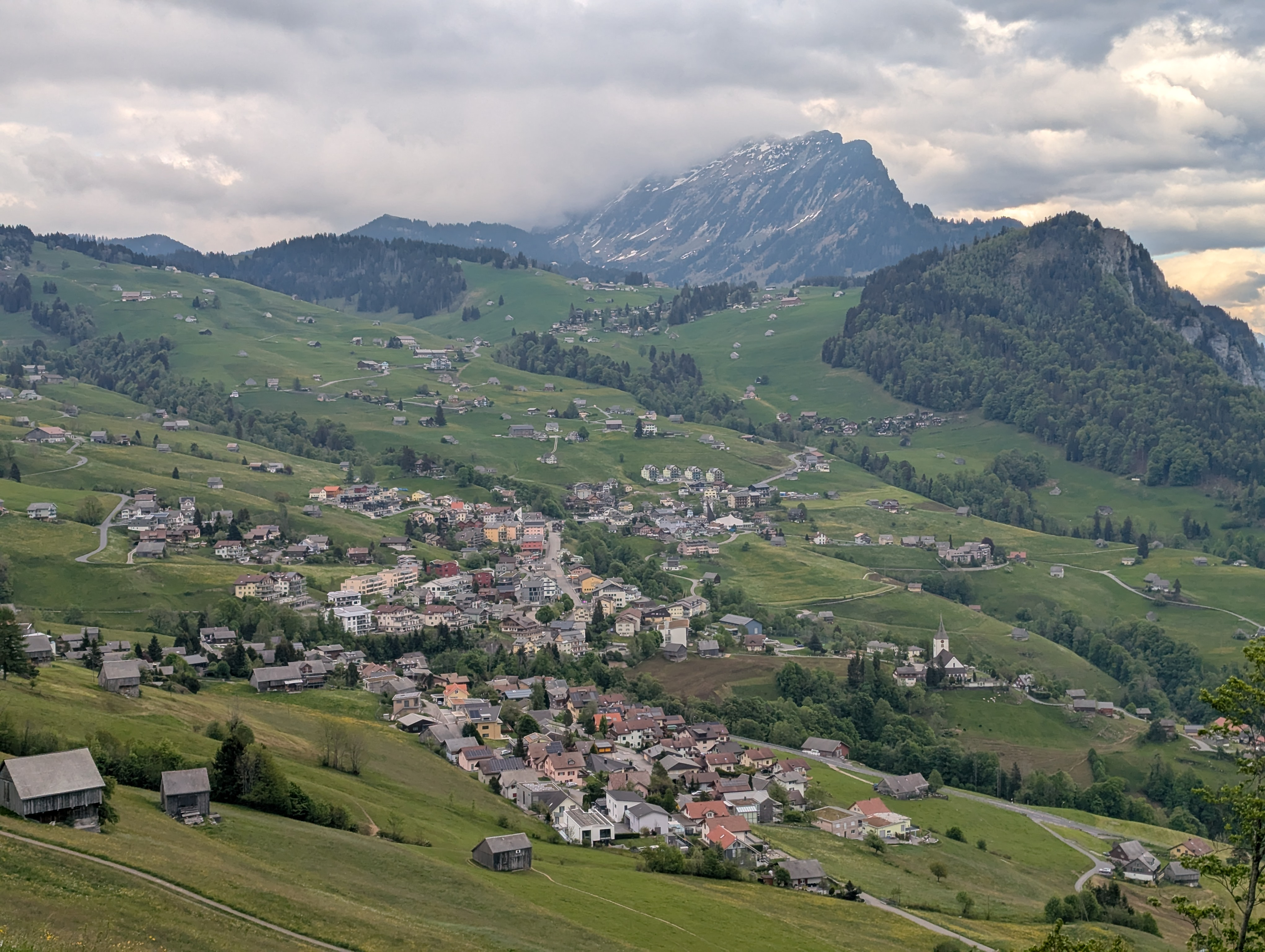
The village from a nearby trail

Amden has a population (as of 31 December 2020) of 1,876. As of 2007, about 8.3% of the population was made up of foreign nationals. Of the foreign population, (as of 2000), 34 are from Germany, 5 are from Italy, 59 are from ex-Yugoslavia, 6 are from Austria, 9 are from Turkey, and 66 are from another country. Over the last 10 years the population has grown at a rate of 5.6%. Most of the population (as of 2000) speaks German (93.0%), with Serbo-Croatian being second most common ( 1.3%) and Albanian being third ( 0.6%). Of the Swiss national languages (as of 2000), 1,482 speak German, 9 people speak French, 8 people speak Italian,

The age distribution, as of 2000, in Amden is; 205 children or 12.9% of the population are between 0 and 9 years old and 199 teenagers or 12.5% are between 10 and 19. Of the adult population, 170 people or 10.7% of the population are between 20 and 29 years old. 263 people or 16.5% are between 30 and 39, 189 people or 11.9% are between 40 and 49, and 187 people or 11.7% are between 50 and 59. The senior population distribution is 177 people or 11.1% of the population are between 60 and 69 years old, 130 people or 8.2% are between 70 and 79, there are 64 people or 4.0% who are between 80 and 89, and there are 9 people or 0.6% who are between 90 and 99.

In 2000 there were 174 persons (or 10.9% of the population) who were living alone in a private dwelling. There were 367 (or 23.0%) persons who were part of a couple (married or otherwise committed) without children, and 793 (or 49.8%) who were part of a couple with children. There were 75 (or 4.7%) people who lived in single parent home, while there are 4 persons who were adult children living with one or both parents, 6 persons who lived in a household made up of relatives, 9 who lived household made up of unrelated persons, and 165 who are either institutionalized or live in another type of collective housing.

In the 2007 federal election the most popular party was the SVP which received 41.8% of the vote. The next three most popular parties were the CVP (31.5%), the SP (7.6%) and the FDP (6.2%).

In Amden about 65.5% of the population (between age 25–64) have completed either non-mandatory upper secondary education or additional higher education (either university or a Fachhochschule). Out of the total population in Amden, as of 2000, the highest education level completed by 334 people (21.0% of the population) was Primary, while 541 (34.0%) have completed Secondary, 164 (10.3%) have attended a Tertiary school, and 56 (3.5%) are not in school. The remainder did not answer this question.

The historical population is given in the following table:

year	population
c. 1800	1,350
1834	1,644
1850	1,524
1900	1,229
1950	1,372
2000	1,593
2010	1,664

== Heritage sites of national significance ==
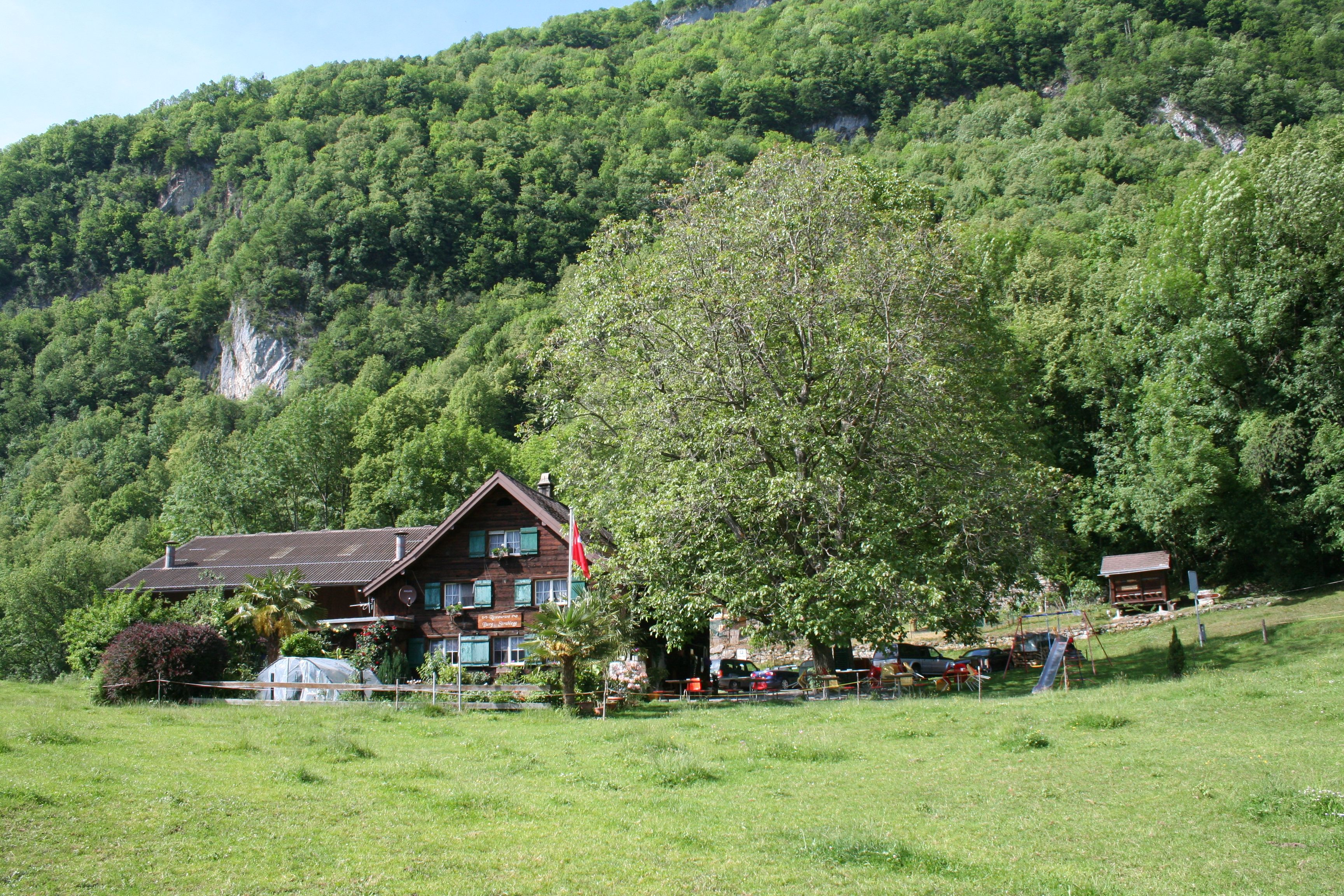
Restaurant Strahlegg in Betlis near the ruins

The ruined Roman watch tower at Betlis-Stralegg is listed as a Swiss heritage site of national significance.

== Economy ==
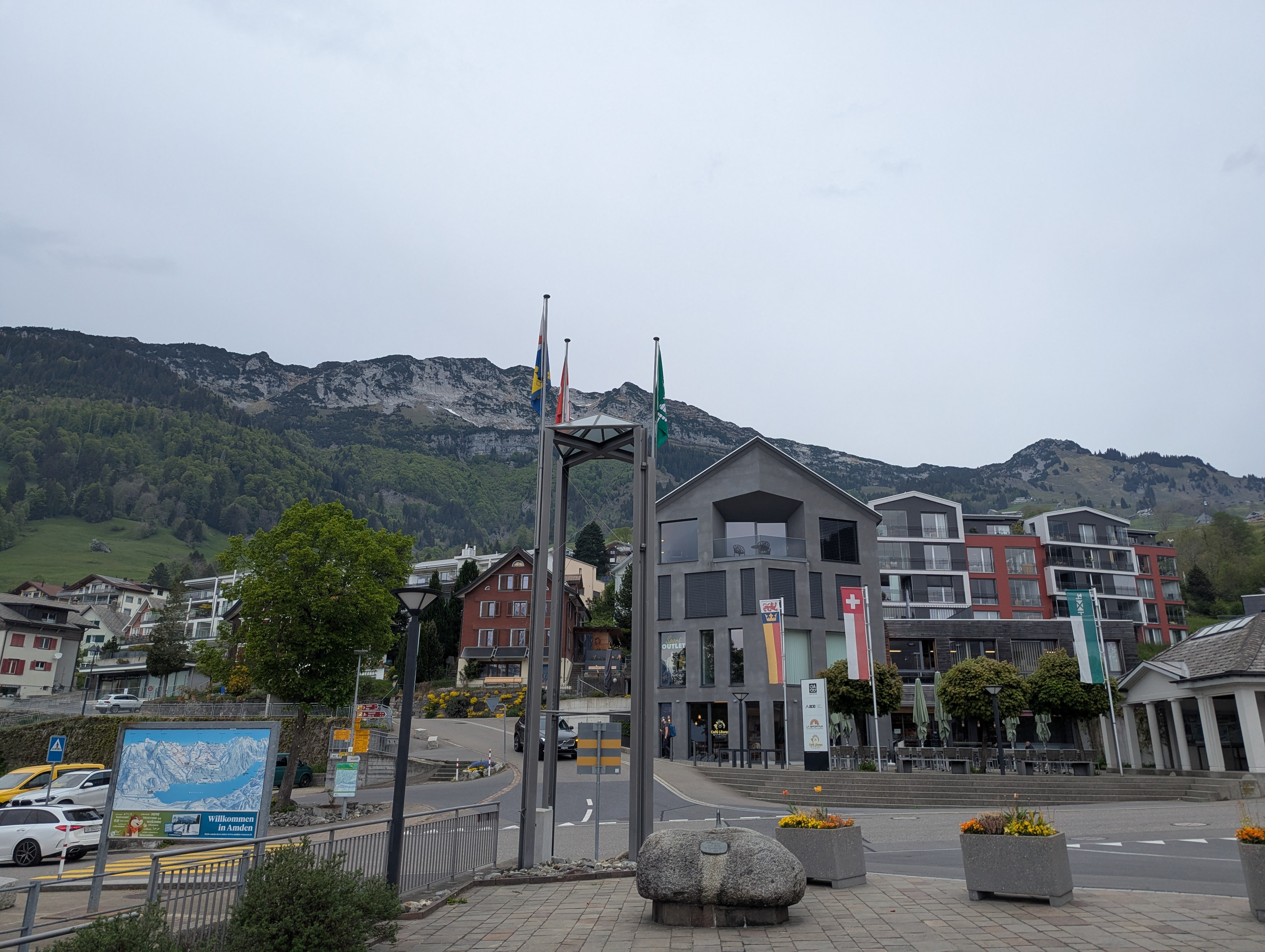
The village center

As of 2007, Amden had an unemployment rate of 0.77%. As of 2005, there were 151 people employed in the primary economic sector and about 61 businesses involved in this sector. 56 people are employed in the secondary sector and there are 17 businesses in this sector. 319 people are employed in the tertiary sector, with 58 businesses in this sector.

As of October 2009 the average unemployment rate was 1.9%. There were 130 businesses in the municipality of which 17 were involved in the secondary sector of the economy while 56 were involved in the third.

As of 2000 there were 377 residents who worked in the municipality, while 406 residents worked outside Amden and 30 people commuted into the municipality for work.

== Transport ==
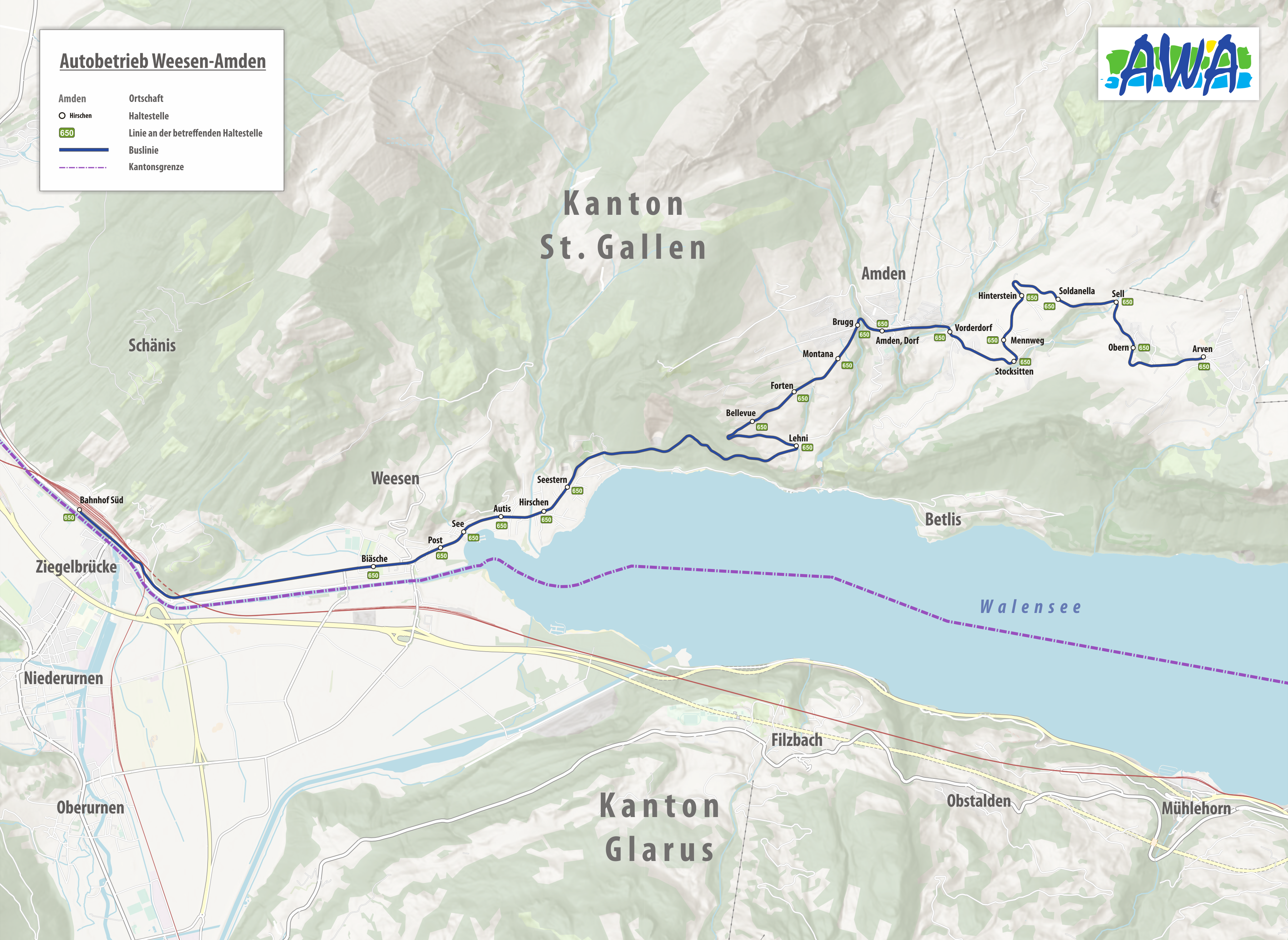
AWA bus route

The Autobetrieb Weesen-Amden (AWA) bus route 650 links Amden-Arvenbüel with Weesen and Ziegelbrücke railway station, which is served by InterRegio long-distance trains to Bern, Chur and Zürich HB, and by regional trains of the St. Gallen S-Bahn and Zurich S-Bahn.

== Religion ==
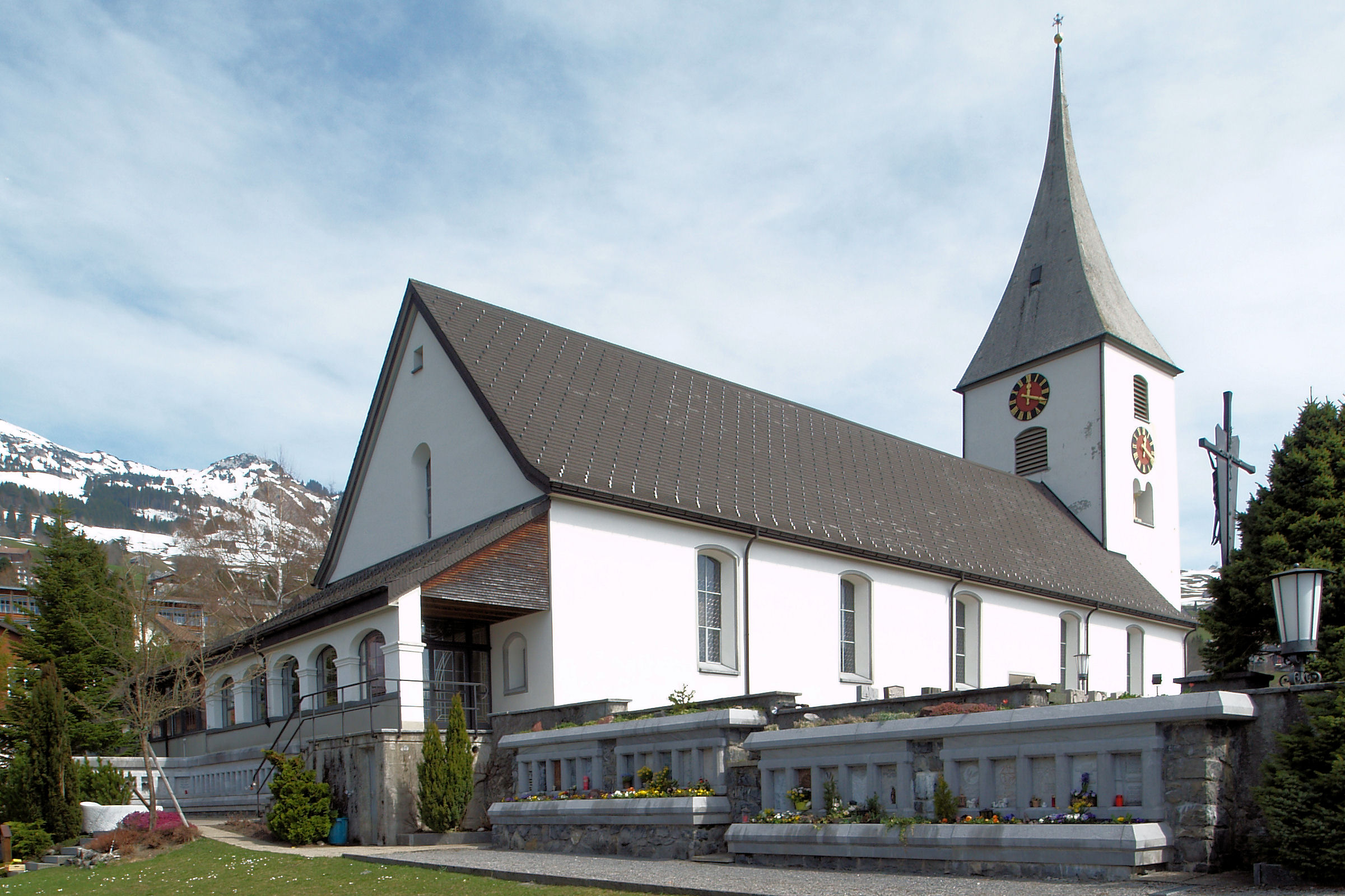
Parish church in Amden

From the 2000 census, 1,007 or 63.2% are Roman Catholic, while 337 or 21.2% belonged to the Swiss Reformed Church. Of the rest of the population, there are 19 individuals (or about 1.19% of the population) who belong to the Orthodox Church, and there are 10 individuals (or about 0.63% of the population) who belong to another Christian church. There are 2 individuals (or about 0.13% of the population) who are Jewish, and 55 (or about 3.45% of the population) who are Islamic. There are 12 individuals (or about 0.75% of the population) who belong to another church (not listed on the census), 70 (or about 4.39% of the population) belong to no church, are agnostic or atheist, and 81 individuals (or about 5.08% of the population) did not answer the question.

== See also ==
- Betlis Chapel
