= Schindler =

Schindler is a German surname that is derived from the German word "schindel", which means "shingle". This suggests that the original bearers of the name were in the roofing business. Variations and alternate spellings of the name include: Shindler, Schindel, and Schindelle.

- Abraham Schindler (1739–1806), Swiss merchant and banker
- Adam Schindler (born 1983), American mixed martial artist
- Alexander M. Schindler (1925–2000), American rabbi
- Allen R. Schindler, Jr. (1969–1992), American navy petty officer, victim of a hate crime
- Alma Schindler (1879–1964), later known as Alma Mahler-Werfel, Austrian composer
- Ambrose Schindler (1917–2018), American football player
- Anton Felix Schindler (1795–1864), secretary and biographer of Beethoven
- Anton Karl Schindler (1879–1964), German botanist
- Bill Schindler (1909–1952), American race car driver
- Christopher Schindler (born 1990), German footballer
- David Schindler (1940–2021), American-Canadian ecologist
- Denise Schindler (born 1985), German Paralympic cyclist
- Dietrich Schindler (politician) (1795–1882), Swiss politician
- Dietrich Schindler (jurist, born 1890) (1890–1948), Swiss jurist
- Dietrich Schindler (jurist, born 1924) (1924–2018), Swiss jurist
- Emil Jakob Schindler (1842–1892), Austrian landscape painter
- Emilie Schindler (1907–2001), German humanitarian, wife of Oskar
- Frederic Schindler (born 1980), French-Argentinean music supervisor and entrepreneur
- Friedrich Martin Schindler (1858–1927), Swiss industrialist
- George Schindler (born 1929), American stage magician, magic consultant, comedian, actor, ventriloquist and writer
- Hans Schindler Bellamy (1901–1982), Austrian researcher and author
- Harold Schindler (1929–1998), American journalist and historian
- Kaspar Schindler (died 1791) (1717–1791), Swiss politician
- Kaspar Schindler (died 1836) (1761–1836), Swiss politician
- Kaspar Schindler (philanthropist) (1828–1902), Swiss silk manufacturer and philanthropist
- Kaspar Schindler (veterinarian) (1832–1898), Swiss veterinarian and politician
- Kevin Schindler (born 1988), German footballer
- Kingsley Schindler (born 1993), German footballer
- Konrad Schindler (died 1809) (1734–1809), Swiss physician
- Konrad Schindler (died 1841) (1757–1841), Swiss politician
- Kurt Schindler (1882–1935), German composer and conductor
- Jan Schindler (born 1978), Czech rower
- Jochem Schindler (1944–1994), Austrian Indo-Europeanist
- Johann Heinrich Schindler (1753–1818), Swiss merchant and banker
- Lisa Schindler (born 1929), Austrian sprint canoer
- Lynn Schindler (1944–2018), American politician and businesswoman
- Martin Schindler (born 1996), German darts player
- Marvin Schindler (1932–2003), American professor of German and Slavic studies
- Matthias Schindler (born 1982), German para-cyclist
- Norbert Schindler (born 1949), German politician
- Oskar Schindler (1908–1974), German businessman who saved his Jewish workers from the Holocaust, subject of the film Schindler's List
- Osmar Schindler (1869–1927), German painter
- Otto Schindler (canoeist) (1925–2009), Austrian sprint canoer
- Otto Schindler (zoologist) (1906–1956), German zoologist
- Paul Schindler (born 1952), American computer journalist
- Peter Schindler (born 1960), German composer, musician and author
- Poul Christian Schindler (1648–1740), Danish composer
- Rudolf Schindler (doctor) (1888–1968), German physician and gastroenterologist
- Rudolph Schindler (architect) (1887–1953), Austrian-born American architect
- Samuel Schindler (manufacturer) (1762–1830), Swiss textile manufacturer
- Samuel Dietrich Schindler (1856–1936), Swiss industrialist
- Solomon Schindler (1842–1915), American rabbi
- Steve Schindler (born 1954), American football player
- Szabolcs Schindler (born 1974), Hungarian football player
- Valentin Schindler (died 1604), German Lutheran Hebraist and professor
- Walter Schindler (1897–1991), American navy officer

== See also ==
- Schindler family (Glarus), a family of Mollis in the canton of Glarus
