= Schindler family (Glarus) =

Family of Mollis, canton of Glarus

The Schindler family is an upper-class family of Mollis, now part of the municipality of Glarus Nord, in the canton of Glarus, which also acquired citizenship in other Glarus municipalities. The name Schindler is first recorded in 1395. In the 18th century the Schindlers were among the largest and wealthiest families of the old Land of Glarus, and in the first half of the 19th century they provided a Landammann, Dietrich Schindler. From the second half of the 18th century members of the family went into the textile business.

== History ==
Coat of arms of the Schindler family of Glarus

The family is said to descend from the Wighus, later Wiggisser, who are recorded in the 13th and 14th centuries. The name Schindler is first recorded in 1395. Peter, a member of the council, was an envoy to the Federal Diet (Tagsatzung) from 1416 to 1419. Rudolf Wiggisser called Schindler (died 5 August 1526) was the first Glarus bailiff (Landvogt) in the Rheintal, from 1502 to 1505. Konrad Schindler called Wiggisser was bailiff in the Gaster four times between 1538 and 1552 and was involved several times in disputes between the Confederates. The shipping master (Schiffmeister), councillor (Ratsherr) and head of the Tagwen (Tagwenvogt) Balthasar (died 1636) can be identified as one of the progenitors of the Schindlers of Mollis.

In the 18th century the Schindlers were among the largest and wealthiest families of the old Land of Glarus. In the first half of the 19th century they provided the Landammann in the person of Dietrich, son of Samuel. Many Schindlers of Mollis entered foreign military service in the 17th and 18th centuries, and some became officers. Georg (1744–1823) founded the Dutch branch of the family.

As early as the second half of the 18th century, and above all in the 19th century, members of the family went into the textile business, among them the brothers Abraham and Johann Heinrich. Two of Johann Heinrich's sons developed the agency in Lisbon into an independent business and settled in Portugal with their descendants. Some of Samuel's descendants moved their businesses to Vorarlberg, among them Friedrich Wilhelm. Samuel's grandson Kaspar was a silk manufacturer in Zurich. Kaspar's sons Friedrich Martin and Samuel Dietrich left the textile industry. In the 19th and 20th centuries many Schindlers worked as physicians, lawyers or in other academic professions. In the early 21st century the family was still flourishing in Mollis.

== Bibliography ==
- Schweizerisches Geschlechterbuch, 1, 507–510; 2, 687–689; 7, 490–513
- J. Winteler, Aus der Geschichte der Familie Schindler von Mollis, 1936
- H. R. Stauffacher, Herrschaft und Landsgemeinde, 1989
- F. Stucki, 50 alte Glarner Familien, 1989
