= Dietrich Schindler =

Dietrich Schindler may refer to:

- Dietrich Schindler (politician) (1795–1882), Swiss politician, Landammann of Glarus
- Samuel Dietrich Schindler (1856–1936), Swiss industrialist, general director of Maschinenfabrik Oerlikon
- Dietrich Schindler (jurist, born 1890) (1890–1948), Swiss jurist, son of Samuel Dietrich Schindler
- Dietrich Schindler (jurist, born 1924) (1924–2018), Swiss jurist and member of the International Committee of the Red Cross, son of the above
