= Kaspar Schindler =

Kaspar Schindler or Caspar Schindler may refer to:

- Kaspar Schindler (died 1791) (1717–1791), Swiss politician and officer, Landammann of Glarus
- Kaspar Schindler (died 1836) (1761–1836), Swiss politician from Mollis, Glarus
- Kaspar Schindler (philanthropist) (1828–1902), Swiss silk manufacturer and philanthropist
- Kaspar Schindler (veterinarian) (1832–1898), Swiss veterinarian and member of the National Council
