= Schindler (disambiguation) =

Schindler is a German surname.

Schindler may also refer to:

- Schindler Group, Swiss manufacturer of elevators, escalators, and moving walkways
  - Schindler Elevator Corporation, an American offshoot
- Schindlerjuden (Schindler Jews), Jews saved by Oskar Schindler
- 11572 Schindler, a minor planet

== See also ==
- China's Schindler (disambiguation)
- Schindler's list
- Schindleria
- Shidler
- Shindler (disambiguation)
