= Daniel Thürer =

Swiss jurist and professor emeritus

- Born: 6 June 1945 (age 81); St. Gallen, Switzerland
- Occupations: Jurist and professor

Daniel Thürer (born 6 June 1945 in St. Gallen) is a Swiss jurist and professor emeritus of international, comparative constitutional, and European law at the University of Zurich. He is a member of the International Committee of the Red Cross, and of the Institut de Droit International, and presides the German International Law Association. Currently, he is a Fernand Braudel Senior Fellow at the European University Institute in Florence.

== Career ==
Thürer graduated from the Law Faculty of the University of Zurich in 1970. Subsequently, he obtained an LL.M. at the University of Cambridge, and completed his PhD thesis on self-determination in 1974. After conducting post-doctoral research at the University of Zurich (with Prof. Dietrich Schindler jun.), as a fellow at the Max Planck Institute for Comparative Public Law and International Law, and the Harvard Law School, he was the Legal Adviser to the Government of the Canton of Aargau. In 1985, he was appointed to the Chair of International, European and Constitutional Law at the University of Zurich, which he held until 2010, and whose previous occupants include Max Huber and Dietrich Schindler sen. and jun. He was also director of the university's Institute of Public International Law.

Professor Thürer has been teaching regularly at other universities as well. He was a Visiting Research Professor at the Stanford Law School, a Distinguished Visiting Professor at the University of Hong Kong, a member of the Advisory Board of the Concord Center, School of Law in Jerusalem, a Visiting Research Professor at the Harvard Law School, a Consultant and Honorary Professor at the Gujarat National Law University, a visiting professor at the University of Cambridge (Herbert Smith Visiting Programme), a visiting professor at the Institute of Higher International Studies, Panthéon-Assas University and at the Institut des droits de l'homme in Strasbourg.

In addition to his teaching activities, Professor Thürer has been an expert for and member of numerous international institutions. In 1991, he was elected to the Assembly, the supreme governing body of the International Committee of the Red Cross. In this capacity, he participated in missions to Zimbabwe, Zambia, Russia, Belarus, Poland, East Timor, India, Thailand, Myanmar, the Philippines and New Zealand. As CSCE/Organization for Security and Co-operation in Europe expert (human rights dimension), he visited the Baltic States, Czechia and Slovakia, Moldavia and Ukraine. Since 2004, he has been a Member of the Council of the European Commission against Racism and Intolerance (ECRI)). He was a member of the Constitutional Court of Liechtenstein from 1989 to 2000. From 1993 to 1998, Professor Thürer was a member of the expert commission on the revision of the Swiss Federal Constitution. From 2000 to 2001, he was also a member of the so-called Bergier Commission, which re-considered Swiss policies during the Second World War.

In 2007 Daniel Thürer was an initiator and Vice-President of the Convivenza Foundation - International Center for Minorities. In 2020 he was appointed as Honorary President of the Foundation.

== Scholarship ==
Daniel Thürer is noted for an original humanist approach to international law that eschews simplistic realism as well as the positivism still prevalent in international legal scholarship. His multi-layered approach is best illustrated by the 2008 lecture on International Humanitarian Law at the Hague Academy, where this highly technical body of law is, through an inter-disciplinary methodology incorporating religion, history and moral philosophy, re-interpreted to honour its original purpose of reducing human suffering and protecting civilians.

While he maintains a strong idealist belief in the transformative power of international law, his scholarship also advocates a bottom-up approach relying on successful local or regional institutions and traditions. More recently, he has focussed on applying the traditional concept of the res publica to modern constitutional law.

== Works (selection) ==
- Das Selbstbestimmungsrecht der Völker – Mit einem Exkurs zur Jurafrage (PhD Thesis, 1974)
- Perspektive Schweiz. Schulthess, Zürich 1998
- Bund und Gemeinden – Eine rechtsvergleichende Untersuchung (Beiträge des Max-Planck-Instituts zum ausländischen öffentlichen Recht und Völkerrecht, Band 90), Berlin 1986
- Verfassungsrecht der Schweiz – Droit constitutionnel suisse. Schulthess, Zürich 2001 (herausgegeben mit Jean-François Aubert und Jörg Paul Müller)
- Kosmopolitisches Staatsrecht. Schulthess, Zürich 2005 (Grundidee Gerechtigkeit, Band 1)
- Völkerrecht als Fortschritt und Chance. Dike/Nomos, Zürich/Baden-Baden 2009 (Grundidee Gerechtigkeit, Band 2)
- Thomas Buergenthal and Daniel Thürer: Menschenrechte. Ideale, Instrumente, Institutionen. Dike, Zürich / St. Gallen, und Nomos, Baden-Baden 2010. 453 p.
- International Humanitarian Law: Theory and Practice (The Pocket Books of the Hague Academy of International Law), Martinus Nijhoff, Leiden, forthcoming 2010, ISBN 978-90-04-17910-3.
- Thürer, D. and Blindenbacher, R.: Embracing Differences - A Commitment for Minorities and Managing Diversity. Jubilee Edition of the Convivenza Book Series Volume 5. Schulthess Verlag, Zürich 2018.
