= Konrad Schindler =

Konrad Schindler may refer to:

- Konrad Schindler (died 1809) (1734–1809), Swiss physician and councillor from Mollis, Glarus
- Konrad Schindler (died 1841) (1757–1841), Swiss politician from Mollis, Glarus, director of the Linth project
