= Shindler =

Shindler is a German surname that is derived from the German word "schindel" which means "shingle". This suggests that the original bearers of the name were related to the trades of making and installing them. Given the demographics of the name's appearance, it is also possible that Shindler is an anglicization of the German surname "Schindler". Variations and alternate spellings include Schindel and Schindelle.

== People with the surname Shindler ==
- Alma Shindler (1879–1964), Austrian-born American socialite and composer
- Antonio Zeno Shindler (c. 1823–1899), Bulgarian-born American photographer and painter
- Colin Shindler (born 1949), English historian and writer
- Conrad Shindler, Revolutionary War veteran; original owner of the Conrad Shindler House
- Conrad Shindler (born 1988), an American professional golfer.
- Geoffrey Shindler (born 1942), British solicitor
- Mary S. B. Shindler (1810–1883), American poet
- Nicola Shindler (born 1968), British television producer and executive
- Amy Shindler, British actress and television writer

== See also ==
- Schindel
- The Conrad Shindler House, historic building, now part of The Historic Shepherdstown Museum, in Shepherdstown, West Virginia
- Shindler, South Dakota, unincorporated community in the northeastern corner of Lincoln County, South Dakota, United States
