= Warren W. Cabral =

Bermudian lawyer and author of children's books

- Born: Warren W. Cabral; December 1, 1960 (age 65); Bermuda
- Education: Saltus Grammar School; Upper Canada College; McGill University; Edmund Hall, Oxford; University of Zurich
- Occupations: Lawyer, children's author
- Years active: 1985–present
- Awards: Rhodes Scholarship (1982); Royal Gazette Prize (1990)

Warren W. Cabral (born 1960) is a Bermudian lawyer and writer of children's books, including The Lakeland Mysteries.

== Early life and education ==
Cabral was born in Bermuda on 1 December 1960. He attended Saltus Grammar School in Bermuda and Upper Canada College in Toronto, Canada. He studied modern languages at McGill University in Montreal, graduating with a B.A. in 1982. That same year, Cabral was selected as Bermuda's Rhodes Scholar and matriculated at St Edmund Hall, Oxford, where he studied law and earned an honours degree in 1985. He was called to the Bar of England and Wales at the Middle Temple in 1985.

== Career ==
Cabral began his legal career as a pupil with the Bermuda-based law firm Appleby. He briefly worked in London with the firm Wilde Sapte before returning to Appleby in 1989. Cabral became a partner at Appleby in 1994, specializing in corporate and commercial law. He was Head of Insurance from 1997 till his move to London in 2002.

In 2002, Cabral was appointed managing partner of Appleby's new London office, a role he held for ten years. During this period, he also served as the Secretary of the Association for Due Process and the Constitution. In 2005, Cabral accepted the Chambers Global “Offshore Law Firm of the Year” award on the firm's behalf in London.

In 2013, Cabral retired from Appleby where he undertook research in law, particularly in relation to the financial crisis of 2008. He graduated with a master's degree in law at the University of Zurich. From then until 2019, he served as chairman of the Barristers and Accountants Anti-Money Laundering/Anti-Terrorist Financing Board in Bermuda.

Cabral is also the founder of Wilton Books.

== Writing ==
In the early 1990s, Cabral wrote several one-act plays that were produced by The Bermuda Musical & Dramatic Society, a local theatre group in Bermuda. In 1994, he co-wrote and directed a musical, Joan of Arc, with composer James Burn. Cabral had previously written the island's 1992 annual Christmas pantomime, Sinbad the Sailor. In 1996, he wrote and produced The Three Musketeers. For his 1990 Christmas Short Story, he received The Royal Gazette Prize.

After retiring from law, Cabral began writing children's fiction. He authored The Lakeland Mysteries, a five-novel series for middle-grade readers set in England's Lake District. The five novels, The Fire on Slate Fell, The Wolf of Ennerdale, The Lad in the Lane, The Mystery of the Chemic Tavern, and The Vanishing Young of Rydal Cave, were illustrated by Corryn Webb.

== Personal life ==
Cabral is married and resides in London, England, while maintaining ties to Bermuda. He holds a private pilot's license and is a former member of the Society of Trust and Estate Practitioners (STEP).
