= Schindel =

Schindel is a German surname that is derived from the German word "schindel" which means "shingle". This suggests that the original bearers of the name were in the roofing business. Variations and alternate spellings of the name include: Shindler, Schindelholz Schindler, and Schindelle. Bearers of the surname are mostly concentrated in Germany and Northern Europe, but a significant population are also present in the United States.

- Carol-Ann Schindel, former Republican member of the Ohio House of Representatives from 2007 to 2008
- Charlotte Helene von Schindel (1690–1752), Danish noble, lady in waiting and mistress of King Frederick IV of Denmark
- Cy Schindel (1907–1948), American actor who appeared in 37 Three Stooges short subjects
- Loreni Schindel, Brazilian painter, sculptor and contemporary artist
- Morton Schindel (1918–2016), American educator and producer, the founder of Weston Woods Studios
- Ulrich Schindel (1935–2025), German classical philologist

== See also ==
- Schijndel
- Shindler
- Schindler
