= Schweizerische Metallurgische Gesellschaft =

Swiss aluminum company (1887–1894)

- Industry: Aluminum smelting
- Founded: 1887
- Founders: Peter Emil Huber; Gustave Naville; Georg Neher; Paul-Louis-Toussaint Héroult
- Defunct: 1894
- Fate: Dissolved
- Headquarters: Neuhausen am Rheinfall, Switzerland

The Schweizerische Metallurgische Gesellschaft (Swiss Metallurgical Company) was a Swiss company in Neuhausen am Rheinfall, founded in 1887, which began producing aluminum by electrolysis in 1888. In the same year it founded the Aluminium Industrie Aktien Gesellschaft (AIAG), later Alusuisse, together with the Allgemeine Elektrizitäts-Gesellschaft. The AIAG continued production, and the Schweizerische Metallurgische Gesellschaft was dissolved in 1894.

== History ==
The Schweizerische Metallurgische Gesellschaft was founded in 1887 in Neuhausen am Rheinfall by Peter Emil Huber, Gustave Naville, Georg Neher, the owner of the local ironworks, and Paul-Louis-Toussaint Héroult, the holder of the patent for the electrolysis process. It leased the premises of the Neher ironworks at the Rhine Falls, together with the water power, and in 1888 began producing aluminum by electrolysis.

In the same year the company and the Allgemeine Elektrizitäts-Gesellschaft founded the Aluminium Industrie Aktien Gesellschaft (AIAG, from 1963 Alusuisse), in which German banks held substantial stakes. The AIAG continued production, and the Schweizerische Metallurgische Gesellschaft was dissolved in 1894. At the same time, in the United States, the Pittsburgh Reduction Company (from 1907 the Aluminum Company of America) began producing aluminum by the very similar process of Charles Martin Hall.

== Bibliography ==
- W. Meier, Geschichte der Aluminium-Industrie-Aktien-Gesellschaft Neuhausen, 1888–1938, vol. 1, 1942
- P.D. Stobart, Centenary of the Hall & Héroult Processes, 1886–1986, 1986
- H. Joliet (ed.), Aluminium, 1989
