= Geoffrey Shindler =

British solicitor (born 1942)

- Born: Geoffrey Arnold Shindler; 21 October 1942 (age 83); Manchester, England
- Other names: Geoffrey A. Shindler; G.A. Shindler
- Education: Cambridge University
- Alma mater: Bury Grammar School
- Occupation: Solicitor
- Years active: 1969–present
- Spouse: Gaye Shindler
- Children: 3

Geoffrey Arnold Shindler OBE (born 21 October 1942) is an English solicitor specialising in the field of wills, trusts and estates law. He is a founding member and president of Society of Trust and Estate Practitioners (STEP).

== Early life ==
Shindler was born in Manchester, England, to Israel Shindler and Florence Shindler (née Weidberg).

Shindler attended and graduated from Bury Grammar School. He graduated with first class honours from Gonville and Caius College, Cambridge as a W. M. Tapp scholar with Master of Arts and Master of Laws degrees. Shindler qualified as a solicitor in 1969.

== Career ==
Shindler began his career as a clerk from 1966 to 1968 at the law firm, March Pearson & Skelton, working his way up from assistant solicitor from 1968 to 1971, to partner from 1971 to 1986.

From 1986 to 2005, Shindler was a partner at the Manchester-based law firm, Halliwell Landau Manchester, where he was Head of Trusts and Estates. From 2005 to 2006, he was a senior member at Halliwells.

In April 2006, Shindler left Halliwells after 20 years with the firm to establish a new firm in partnership with Roger Lane-Smith, former Senior Partner of DLA Piper. The new firm, Lane-Smith & Shindler LLP, opened on 2 May 2006. Shindler was at Lane-Smith & Shindler LLP until 2011 when the firm became a part of DWF LLP. From 2011 to 2014, Shindler was a consultant at DWF. Since 2014, he currently works as a partner at Nova Private Client LLP.

Shindler is a member of the editorial board of the Wills & Trusts Law Reports and Tottel's Trust Law International and Consulting Editor of the Trusts and Estates Law & Tax Journal. He also edited Trust Drafting and Precedents.

Shindler contributed to the restructuring and updating of Ray & McLaughlin's Practical Inheritance Tax Planning.

One of the founding members of the Society of Trust and Estate Practitioners (STEP), Shindler was appointed president of STEP worldwide in November 2006. He was instrumental in developing their education program. He is a former chairman of the organisation.

== Personal life ==
In 1966, Shindler married Gay Shindler (née Kenton). The couple had three children: British television producer Nicola Shindler, Freya Boroda, and Caroline Conway.

His brother is Colin Shindler, who wrote Manchester United Ruined My Life.

== Selected leadership and honors ==
- 1995-1997: Opera North, Director
- 2003–present: Royal Exchange Theatre, Manchester, Director; Chairman, Development Committee (2000-2012)
- 2005–present: Manchester Camerata, Board Member; Chairman (2007–2012)
- 2006–present: Society of Trust and Estate Practitioners (STEP), STEP Worldwide, President; Chairman (1994-1998); Vice President (1998–2006); STEP Education Committee, Chairman (1999-2006)
- 2006–present: Lancashire County Cricket Club, Board Member (2012–present); Vice Chairman (2009-2012); Chairman Business Committee (2008-2012)
- 2007: Officer of the Order of the British Empire for services to the administration of justice
- 2012–present: Manchester Camerata Charity, Chairman
- 2017: STEP Private Client Award for Lifetime Achievement
- International Academy of Estate & Trust Law, Member
- International Compliance Association, Advisory Committee
- Manchester Portico Library Charitable Trust, Trustee
- Tottel's Trust Law International, Editorial Board
- Trust Law Committee, Member
- Trusts and Estates Law & Tax Journal, Editor
- Wills & Trusts Law Reports, Editorial Board

== Selected works and publications ==
Books

- Shindler, Geoffrey A.; Hodkinson, Keith (1984). Law of Trusts. Bicester, Oxfordshire: CCH Editions. ISBN 978-0-863-25019-4. OCLC 715957845.
- Shindler, Geoffrey; Bell, Julie, eds. (2008). Trust Drafting and Precedents. Tolley, Haywards Heath, London: Tottel, Bloomsbury Professional. ISBN 978-1-845-92832-2. OCLC 649652368.
- Aldridge, Trevor M.; Shindler, Geoffrey A.; Sherry, Susan E. (2016). Powers of Attorney (11th ed.). London: Sweet & Maxwell. ISBN 978-0-414-05089-1. OCLC 957614445.
- McLaughlin, Mark; Shindler, Geoffrey A.; Davies, P. L.; Ray, Ralph P. (2016). Ray & McLaughlin's Practical Inheritance Tax Planning (13th ed.). Haywards Heath: Bloomsbury Professional. ISBN 978-1-780-43775-0. OCLC 962403742.

Journals

- Shindler, Geoffrey (1997). "Estate Planning – Geoffrey Shindler Sees Estate Planning As a Continuing Process, in Which an Up-to-Date Will Plays a Necessary Part". Solicitors Journal. 141 (40): 996. ISSN 0038-1047. OCLC 88303974.
- Shindler, Geoffrey (May 2017). "Musings From Manchester: Who's judging?". Trusts & Estates Law and Tax Journal. 186.
