= Pony Club Secrets =

Series of children's books by Stacy Gregg

- Mystic and the Midnight Ride (2007); Blaze and the Dark Rider (2007); Destiny and the Wild Horses (2008); Stardust and the Daredevil Ponies (2008); Comet and the Champion's Cup (2008); Issie and the Christmas Pony (2008); Storm and the Silver Bridle (2009); Fortune and the Golden Trophy (2009); Victory and the All-Stars Academy (2009); Flame and the Rebel Riders (2010); Angel and the Flying Stallions (2010); Liberty and the Dream Ride (2011); Nightstorm and the Grand Slam (2011)
- Author: Stacy Gregg
- Country: New Zealand
- Language: English
- Genre: Pony book
- Publisher: HarperCollins (UK)

Pony Club Secrets is a series of junior and intermediate reader children's books published by HarperCollins in the United Kingdom. The series was created by author and journalist Stacy Gregg, and is loosely based on her experiences as a young rider growing up in New Zealand. It blends authentic horse and pony detail with a mixture of fantasy and adventure. The series is set in a fictionalised version of New Zealand, in an area called Chevalier Point.

The first two books in the series, Mystic and the Midnight Ride and Blaze and the Dark Rider, were first published simultaneously in the UK in August 2007, and have since been published together as a double edition called Mystic and Blaze.

Originally there were four titles scheduled in the series, but due to its popularity it was extended to eight and then 13 titles in all, including a special Christmas book entitled Issie and the Christmas Pony.

A spin-off series was announced by the author and her publishers in 2009, called Pony Club Rivals. This series features a new main character, Georgie Parker, and is set in the UK and the USA. The first book in the series, Pony Club Rivals: The Auditions, was published in the UK in April 2010. It is based in Kentucky USA at the school Blainford "All Stars" Academy mentioned in "Victory and the All Stars Academy." It follows Georgina Parker as she attempts to become a top eventing rider. It features many characters and the series features four books in total.

The books have been adapted into a television series, which premiered on CBBC in the UK on 14 July 2020.

== Titles ==
- Mystic and the Midnight Ride (2007)
- Blaze and the Dark Rider (2007)
- Destiny and the Wild Horses (2008)
- Stardust and the Daredevil Ponies (2008)
- Comet and the Champion's Cup (2008)
- Issie and the Christmas Pony (2008)
- Storm and the Silver Bridle (2009)
- Fortune and the Golden Trophy (2009)
- Victory and the All-Stars Academy (2009)
- Flame and the Rebel Riders (2010)
- Angel and the Flying Stallions (2010)
- Liberty and the Dream Ride (2011)
- Nightstorm and the Grand Slam (2011)

== Special editions ==
- Mystic and Blaze (2009)
- Destiny and Stardust (2010)
- Comet and Storm (2011)

== Pony Club Rivals ==
- 1. The Auditions (2010)
- 2. Showjumpers (2010)
- 3. Riding Star (2011)
- 4. The Prize (2011)

== Main characters ==
Isadora "Issie" Brown is the main character throughout the series. Horse-mad Issie is described as having long brown hair and an olive complexion. She owns Blaze, Comet, and Storm. She used to own Mystic before he was killed in a freak car accident saving the other horses, including Stella's pony Coco, Kate's horse Toby, and Natasha's pony Goldrush, as well as Issie herself, during a gymkhana. Her best friends are Stella Tarrant and Kate Knight, and her enemy is Natasha Tucker (owner of Goldrush). Issie is an extremely talented rider, who has the ability to take it to the top and win multiple awards as well as inspiring many young riders.

Stella Tarrant is Issie's best friend. Stella is bubbly, mischievous and described by Issie as 'boy-mad'. She has short red curly hair and a freckly complexion. Stella loves playing pranks and winding people up. She used to own Coco until she outgrew her, and currently owns Marmite, a Blackthorn Pony caught and tamed after the events of the third book.

Kate Knight is Issie's other best friend, completely the opposite to Stella, Kate is sensible and mature. She has blonde hair and blue eyes and is extremely tall. Kate has a way with children, which comes in handy in'Comet and the Champion's Cup', when she is tasked with helping run a children's riding camp. She owns an ex-racehorse called Toby.

Tom Avery is Issie, Stella, Kate, and Natasha's riding instructor. Tom used to be a famous eventer in his youth, but after seriously injuring himself whilst competing at Badminton horse trials, he had to retire from the sport. He is now head instructor at Chevalier Point Pony Club. He lives at Winterflood Farm where he keeps his horses. And in Flame and the Rebel Riders he takes over Dulmoth Park too. He is frequently seen wearing his trademark cheese-cutter cap and has a habit of always whacking his riding crop against his riding boot. However he is particularly close to Issie and is the one who brought her Anglo-Arab mare Blaze to her after rescuing her with the help of ILPH (International League for the Protection of Horses) which he works for. In Angel and the Flying Stallions, he marries the head trainer of El Caballo Magnifico, Francoise D'arth, who returns to Chevalier Point to train the dressage there.

Natasha Tucker is the antagonist of the series; snobby Natasha frequently makes fun of Issie's 'circus pony' Blaze. She is nicknamed 'Stuck Up Tucker' by Stella, Kate, and Issie. The bratty blonde is always making nasty remarks about Issie, and by the end of Fortune and the Golden Trophy they are full-fledged enemies. After the book Flame and The Rebel Riders, they become mildly friendly. In the fourth book, she reveals that her parents are going through a bitter divorce. She owns multiple beautiful and expensive horses over the course of the series, including Goldrush and Romeo, but is constantly having her parents buy her new ones.

Aidan is Hester's farm manager and later Issie's boyfriend, though they split up by the end of the series. He is good-natured and was willing to continue to work on Hester's Farm despite her being unable to pay him.

Hester Brown is Amanda's sister and Issie's aunt who lives at Blackthorn Farm, near Gisborne. Hester trains animals for movies with the help of her farm manager Aiden. Hester owns, Diablo, Paris, Nicole, Dolomite, Titan, Scott, Tornado, Stardust, Destiny who are the 'Daredevil Ponies' and she also owns Glennie, Molly, Timmy and Julian who are all Blackthorn ponies. Hester also owns other farm animals. She has been married three times but is now divorced and remains single throughout the series. As a joke, she calls Issie 'her favourite niece', because Issie is her only niece. She is a notoriously bad cook.

Amanda Brown is Hester's sister and Issie's mother who works for a law firm. She is petrified of horses and is divorced just like Hester. Her husband left when Issie was nine. In Angel and the Flying Stallions, Amanda rides a stallion Ferdinand with the help of Roberto. At the start of the series Amanda repeatedly refuses to buy her daughter Issie a pony, despite Issie having the right amount of money. Eventually though, Amanda gives in and lets Issie buy a pony, Mystic.

(Issie did also look after Victory for a while until Natasha bought him from the horse's Tulia, but then things suddenly turn around when she is given the ride on him for Badminton.

Tara Kelly is a former four-star eventer mentioned in "Victory and The All Stars Academy" and "Liberty and The Dream Ride", and a major character in the Pony Club Rivals books. She is portrayed as extremely hard to impress. In "Victory and The All Stars Academy", Tara comes to Melbourne to coach Issie and the Team through Cross Country. Tara is a teacher at Blainford Academy and is the head of eventing. She offers Issie a place at Blainford which Issie declines. In the books Tara is described as thin and slender with fine bones and glossy walnut brown hair, and she has a smattering of delicate freckles across her cheekbones. Her fashion sense is described as tasteful but slightly horsey. Even though Tara is portrayed as cold and strict, sometimes her facade melts; she cradles Issie in her lap after rescuing her from a wild dog in "Victory and The All Stars Academy", and has several maternal moments throughout the series "Pony Club Rivals". In "Pony Club Rivals", Georgie's rival Kennedy Kirkwood calls Tara "a sad old spinster", and another character refers to her as "Miss Kelly", suggesting she is unmarried. Tara is shown to get on well with people, in particular Blainfords Head Mrs Dickins Thomson. In "The Prize" she is depicted as having been friends with polo player "Sebastian "Seb" Upton-Baker" since school. In "The Prize", she loses her temper at dressage rider Allegra Hickman for using rollkur.
