= Emil Huber-Stockar =

Swiss entrepreneur and railway pioneer

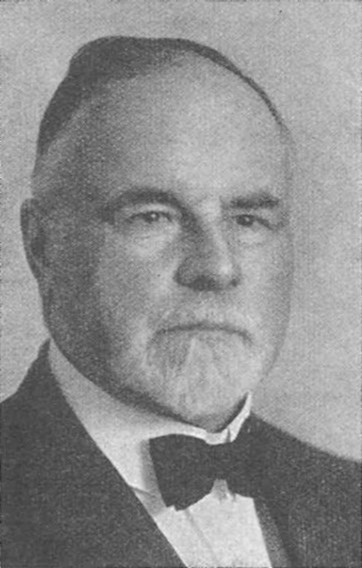
Emil Huber-Stockar

Emil Huber-Stockar (July 15, 1865 – May 9, 1939) was a Swiss entrepreneur and railway pioneer. He was an instrumental figure in the electrification of the Swiss railway network and worked as lead engineer and consultant for the Swiss Federal Railways.

== Life ==
Huber was born on July 15, 1865, in Zürich-Riesbach, Switzerland the son of Peter Emil and Anna Marie (née Werdmüller). His father hailed from a wealthy textile manufacturer family. His father was a former chairman of Oerlikon Buehrle and a pioneer of the machinery and electric industry. He had a prosper upbringing in Zürich District 7.

After training as a mechanical engineer at the ETH Zurich (Swiss Federal Institute of Technology at Zürich) and spending some years in America, Huber took over the management of the Maschinenfabrik Oerlikon, founded by his father Peter Emil Huber-Werdmüller, near Zürich, Switzerland. He focussed on solving the difficulties of high power, electrically powered mainline railway systems. In 1904, he electrified the Seebach-Wettingen line with high-voltage alternating current (15,000 volts) at low frequency (15 Hertz). This experimental operation was successful. The first railway to use this system (standard in several European countries today, but with a frequency of 16.7 Hertz) was the Bern–Lötschberg–Simplon railway. In 1925, Emil Huber-Stockar received an honorary doctorate from the ETH Zurich for his achievements.

== Family ==
Emil Huber-Stockar was the son of Peter Emil Huber-Werdmüller and brother of lawyer and diplomat Max Huber. In 1895, Emil married Marie Helena Stockar, daughter of Hans Julius, a lawyer.
