= Mystic (TV series) =

2020 television series

- Genre: Thriller; Drama; Ecofiction; Fantasy; Teen drama
- Created by: Amy Shindler and Beth Chalmers
- Based on: Pony Club Secrets by Stacy Gregg
- Directed by: Peter Salmon; Aidee Walker; Michael Hurst
- Starring: Macey Chipping; Laura Patch; Cathy Downes; Phil Brown; Kirk Torrance; Jonny Brugh; Antonia Robinson; Max Crean; Joshua Tan; Harriet Walton
- Composers: David Long; Stephen Gallagher
- Country of origin: New Zealand
- Original language: English
- No. of series: 3
- No. of episodes: 29

Production
- Executive producers: Amy Buscombe; Richard Fletcher; Simon Crawford-Collins; Amy Shindler; Beth Chalmers; Brian Bird
- Producers: Trevor Haysom; Emily Anderton; Hannah Prior
- Cinematography: Dave Cameron; Drew Sturge
- Editors: Jochen Fitzherbert; Gary Hunt; Margot Francis
- Running time: 30 minutes
- Production companies: Libertine Pictures; Slim film+television

Original release
- Network: CBBC (UK); TVNZ (New Zealand); Seven Network (Australia)
- Release: 14 July 2020 – 4 July 2022

Mystic is a New Zealand environmental teen drama television series produced by Libertine Pictures and Slim film+television for CBBC, TVNZ and the Seven Network.

Created by Amy Shindler and Beth Chalmers, it is based on Pony Club Secrets, Stacy Gregg's series of pony novels, the first of which is Mystic and the Midnight Ride (2007). Set on the fictional peninsula of Kauri Point, New Zealand, Mystic tells the story of Issie Brown and her new-found friendships with the town's teen horse riders, and their efforts to save Kauri Point from an industrial development that threatens it. It stars Macey Chipping. The series premiered on CBBC and BBC iPlayer in the UK on 14 July 2020. Mystic season two launched in November 2021 and season three in July 2022.

Season two won Best Children's Programme at the Asian Academy Creative Awards in 2022 and in 2023, Season three picked up the award for Best Children's Programme at the NZTV awards.

== Cast and characters ==
- Macey Chipping as Issie Brown. Having just moved from London to Kauri Point, she struggles to make friends and misses her old home. However, a chance encounter with wild ponies Blaze and Mystic convinces her to stay.
- Laura Patch as Amanda Brown, Issie's mother.
- Cathy Downes as Mitch, Amanda's mother and Issie's grandmother.
- Phil Brown as Sam Tucker, father of Natasha Tucker.
- Kirk Torrance as Tom Avery
- Jonny Brugh as Kenny Burford, mayor of Kauri Point.
- Antonia Robinson as Natasha Tucker, one of Kauri Point's teen riders.
- Max Crean as Dan Townley, one of Kauri Point's teen riders.
- Jacqueline Joe as Caroline Burford, one of Kauri Point's teen riders.
- Joshua Tan as Caleb Burford, one of Kauri Point's teen riders.
- Harriet Walton as Stella Tarrant, one of Kauri Point's teen riders.
- Romy Mukerjee as Anisha
- Milo Cawthorne as Adam
- Katlyn Wong as Corinne
- Anais Shand as Dora
- Kelson Henderson as Jake
- Carrie Green as Miriama
- Alison Bruce as Julia
- Xander Manktelow as Hamish Tarrant
- Madeleine Adams as Bianca, Dulmoth Park Rider
- Annise Boothroyd as Nicole, Dulmoth Park Rider
- Ari Boyland as Alex Zarkoff
- Joseph Nathan as Gabe Zarkoff
- Bruce Phillips as Gordon

== Production ==
On 2 October 2018, NZ on Air announced their decision to fund 13 28-minute episodes of Mystic for up to $1,000,000.

Gilly Poole, Suzanne Crowley and Tina Cleary were the series' casting directors. On 10 March 2020, it was announced that Macey Chipping and Laura Patch would play Issie Brown and her mother respectively, alongside a New Zealand cast of Phil Brown, Jacqueline Joe, Kirk Torrance, Cathy Downes, Jonny Brugh, Antonia Robinson, Max Crean, Josh Tan and Harriet Walton.

The series was scheduled to start filming in New Zealand in January 2020, and on 10 March 2020, it was revealed that filming had begun in Auckland, New Zealand. Filming halted when New Zealand went into lockdown in response to the COVID-19 pandemic, and on 5 April 2020, the BBC reported that Chipping had temporarily returned to the UK. Eight episodes from the first season were completed pre-COVID, with the other five completed during the pandemic. After the first series had completed airing, Mystic was renewed for second and third seasons. In February 2022, it was announced by Up TV that the show would premiere as part of the original programming catalog of its streaming service platform Up Faith & Family in April, followed by its linear debut 2 months later on June 2, 2022, airing after Heartland.

== Episodes ==
=== Series 1 (2020–2021) ===
No. overall	No. in series	Title	Directed by	Written by	Original release date
1	1	"The Outsider"	Peter Salmon	Amy Shindler & Beth Chalmers	14 July 2020
Issie, having recently moved from London to Kauri Point due to the death of her father, begins to see a horse in various places. She struggles to make sense of it when she realises that nobody else can see the horses but her. She meets Natasha, who takes her to the stables. When Issie asks the people at the stables to help her to look for the horse, Natasha accuses her of taking over, and leaves her. Issie then finds an unknown man trying to take a horse from the stables, and stops him.
2	2	"The Bond"	Peter Salmon	Scott Payne	21 July 2020
Issie's grandmother Mitch complains to mayor Kenny about a building project that will destroy the habitat of the bees that she keeps in her garden. Wanting to celebrate her dead father's birthday, Issie books tickets to visit London with mother Amanda, who is reluctant to go when she learns of them, but eventually agrees. Sam and Amanda go on a date, but Amanda leaves due to feeling like she is betraying her husband. Issie names the horse Blaze, and manages to bond with the horse. She learns that if she goes to London, Blaze will be euthanised, so she makes the decision to stay in Kauri Point.
3	3	"The Sacrifice"	Peter Salmon	Amy Shindler & Beth Chalmers	28 July 2020
With the stables preparing for a competition, they are let down by a rider so Issie fills in for them on the new riders category. Issie attempts to ride Blaze while nobody is around, which she reacts badly to. When Blaze is enclosed, Natasha accidentally lets her go, and she runs away. Issie sees visions of where she is, and takes Dan to find her. When Dan questions how she knew where to go, Issie explains that she sees mystic-like visions related to horses.
4	4	"The Tides"	Peter Salmon	Samuel E. Shore	4 August 2020
Issie goes to the beach to find proof that she is having visions of a horse, and Caleb follows her due to the high tides and lack of phone signal. She expresses her sadness to Caleb about being an outsider from the rest of the stables, to which he responds that he feels similarly. He then comes out as gay, and asks her to tell nobody, as he is not out to anybody else. When they return home, Caleb suggests that she finds CCTV footage of the horse. Issie searches through the camera files, and finds footage of Natasha letting Blaze go.
5	5	"The Revenge"	Peter Salmon	Steph Matuku	11 August 2020
Determined to expose Natasha for letting Blaze go from her pen, Issie records Natasha confessing to her actions. She sends it to Dan, to be played in front of the residents of Kauri Point. When Natasha apologises, Issie attempts to stop the recording from playing, but accidentally makes a fool of Dan. While playing with the riders, Natasha tackles Issie to the ground and the pair have a fight.
6	6	"The Lost Herd"	Aidee Walker	Amy Shindler & Beth Chalmers	18 August 2020
Issie has a vision of Mystic running through the forest along an old railway track and wonders if it will lead her to Blaze's herd. Issie decides to ride out on Blaze to find the tracks, and Caroline, Caleb, Dan and Natasha join her. As they pass their favourite swimming hole, they notice that it is severely polluted, and filled with dead bees. Dan misses a test due to being out with the others, and it is rearranged for a later date, which intercepts with the Cross-Country Trials.
7	7	"The Switch"	Aidee Walker	Stacey Gregg & Kate McDermott	25 August 2020
At the Cross-Country Trials, the riders discover that a rival team have purposely dropped down a grade in order to win. When Caroline sprains her shoulder, Natasha pretends to be her, riding in her place. Tom learns of their plan, and tells the officials, disqualifying her score, leaving it down to Issie to score well. While riding, she falls from Blaze into the water, and sees a vision of a girl lying on a beach.
8	8	"The Storm"	Aidee Walker	Amy Shindler & Beth Chalmers	1 September 2020
When the riders get stuck in the stables during a storm, Natasha suggests playing truth or dare, but Caleb suggests another game. They play sardines, and while searching for people, Issie asks Caleb when he will be ready to announce that he is gay. Caroline overhears the conversation, and although she accepts him, she is hurt that he did not tell her first. Natasha confides in Dan about how she feels lonely, and goes in to kiss him, but he rejects her advances.
9	9	"The Secret"	Michael Hurst	Amy Shindler & Beth Chalmers	23 March 2021
When Issie and the gang ramp up their anti-Hexronn campaign, the company fight back, revealing details of Issie's troubled past.
10	10	"The Discovery"	Michael Hurst	Amy Shindler & Beth Chalmers	23 March 2021
The kids travel to a remote farm after intercepting a mysterious message. They come face to face with the horse rustler and discover the whereabouts of the Kauri Point Herd.
11	11	"The Claim"	Michael Hurst	Amy Shindler & Beth Chalmers	23 March 2021
Dan is forced to step up when there is an emergency at the stables, Natasha joins the Dulmoth Park team, and Issie is distraught when Blaze's legal owner comes to claim her.
12	12	"The Truth"	Michael Hurst	Amy Shindler & Beth Chalmers	23 March 2021
Issie and the gang target Frankie in an attempt to find out where Blaze is.
13	13	"The Return"	Michael Hurst	Amy Shindler & Beth Chalmers	23 March 2021
Issie tries to find the wild herd, while the rest of the gang attempt to stop Hexronn.

=== Series 2 (2021) ===
No. overall	No. in series	Title	Directed by	Written by	Original release date
14	1	"The Tourist"	Aidee Walker	Amy Shindler & Beth Chalmers	19 November 2021
The gang uncovers a new threat to the forest and wild herd. Issie's visions from Mystic become more mysterious than ever and a new arrival in town causes trouble for Issie and Dan.
15	2	"The Deception"	Aidee Walker	Amy Shindler & Beth Chalmers & Martha Hardy-Ward	19 November 2021
The gang's attempt to stop Tom selling the stables backfires. Issie realises that she's seeing visions of the future. Misunderstandings cause problems between Issie and Dan.
16	3	"The Wager"	Aidee Walker	Amy Shindler & Beth Chalmers	19 November 2021
Dulmoth Park have moved in and the escalating rivalry with the KP team ends in a secret race on the dunes. Meanwhile, Tom's in trouble when the racehorse goes missing.
17	4	"The Doubt"	Aidee Walker	Amy Shindler & Beth Chalmers & Samuel E. Shore	19 November 2021
It looks like Caroline's hopes of becoming an Olympic rider are over after her loss to Nicole in the sand dunes race. Can the KP gang persuade her not to give up on her dream?
18	5	"The Betrayal"	Caroline Bell Booth	Amy Shindler & Beth Chalmers	19 November 2021
Family secrets are revealed. Feeling betrayed by her friends, Issie is quick to retaliate when Bianca takes Blaze. Distracted by Gabe, Issie breaks a promise to Natasha.
19	6	"The Reckoning"	Caroline Bell Booth	Amy Shindler & Beth Chalmers & Hamish Bennett	19 November 2021
It's crunch time for Dan when his leadership skills are tested. Angry with Issie, Gabe and Natasha act recklessly whilst Caleb learns some uncomfortable truths about his idol.
20	7	"The Prophecy"	Caroline Bell Booth	Amy Shindler & Beth Chalmers	19 November 2021
When things from Issie's visions start happening in real life, the gang find themselves in a race against time to change the course of the future before tragedy strikes.
21	8	"The New Future"	Caroline Bell Booth	Amy Shindler & Beth Chalmers	19 November 2021
In the aftermath of the earthquake, Issie puts her own life in danger to try and rescue Natasha whilst Tom finally accepts he has to sign the KP stables over to Ginty.

=== Series 3 (2022) ===
No. overall	No. in series	Title	Directed by	Written by	Original release date
22	1	"The Intruder"	Laurence Wilson	Amy Shindler & Beth Chalmers	4 July 2022
Emotions run high after Issie invites an unwelcome guest to Amanda's birthday party. The KP team have something to celebrate and Issie's confused by her latest visions from Mystic.
23	2	"The Set-Up"	Laurence Wilson	Amy Shindler & Beth Chalmers	4 July 2022
When tension between Dan and Issie starts affecting Champs training, the KP gang decide to take action. Meanwhile, Mystic seems to be warning Issie about the illegal trawler.
24	3	"The Challenger"	Laurence Wilson	Amy Shindler & Beth Chalmers	4 July 2022
Issie's reckless behaviour has disastrous consequences for one of the KP team. Gordon's intrigued when Issie draws a sea serpent statue that she's seen in her visions.
25	4	"The Double-Cross"	Laurence Wilson	Amy Shindler & Beth Chalmers	4 July 2022
As the gang plot to unmask the trawler operation, they find evidence suggesting someone local is in league with the crew. Meanwhile, Issie confides in Gordon about her visions.
26	5	"The Downfall"	Laurence Wilson	Amy Shindler & Beth Chalmers	4 July 2022
A betrayal by Tom shatters the KP team, jeopardising their chance of competing at The Champs. Caleb and Mitch investigate Gordon and Issie finally speaks her mind to Dan.
27	6	"The Conspiracy"	Laurence Wilson	Amy Shindler & Beth Chalmers	4 July 2022
Amanda decides to give Gordon a chance just as Issie starts doubting him. Natasha's the bearer of bad news for Caroline and the true cause of Dora's shipwreck is revealed.
28	7	"The Serpent"	Laurence Wilson	Amy Shindler & Beth Chalmers	4 July 2022
As Kauri Point celebrates ‘The Night of the Big Fish', it's not just dolphins who are drawn to the bay. Has Gordon really abandoned his quest to find the sea serpent statue?
29	8	"The Spoils"	Laurence Wilson	Amy Shindler & Beth Chalmers	4 July 2022
Gordon's missing but it's Champs Day and the future of the rescue centre is on the line. Will the KP team give up their chance of glory to help Issie find her grandfather?
