= Macey Chipping =

British actress

- Born: Macey Rose Chipping; 15 June 2003 (age 23)
- Occupation: Actress
- Years active: 2013–present

Macey Rose Chipping (born 15 June 2003) is an English actress. On television, she is known for her roles in the BBC medical soap opera Holby City (2015–2018) and the CBBC/TVNZ teen drama Mystic (2020–2022).

== Early life ==
Chipping was born on 15 June 2003. Her first experience of acting was when her mother put her in a dance/theatre club when she was 2. When she was 6 her agent visited one of her shows and asked if she wanted to be part of her agency.

== Career ==
Chipping began her career as a child actress and made her feature film debut as Ruby in the 2013 film Hummingbird with Jason Statham. She then portrayed version of Zoey Deutch's character Rosemary in the 2014 film Vampire Academy. Chipping's first recurring role came in the BBC One medical soap opera Holby City playing Evie.

Chipping was cast in the lead role of Issie in the 2020 environmental drama series Mystic. Her favourite thing about the show is the locations where it was shot, and walking on the beach with Mystic the horse.

== Filmography ==
=== Film ===
Year	Title	Role	Notes
2013	Hummingbird	Ruby	
2014	Vampire Academy	Young Rose	
2015	1001 Inventions and the World of Ibn Al-Haytham	Layla	Short

=== Television ===
Year	Title	Role	Notes
2015-2018	Holby City	Evie Fletcher	18 episodes
2020–2022	Mystic	Issie	29 episodes
