= Abraham Schindler =

Swiss merchant and banker (1739–1806)

- Born: 18 January 1739; Wartau, Old Swiss Confederacy
- Died: 28 March 1806 (aged 67); Mollis, Glarus, Switzerland
- Occupations: Merchant; banker; politician
- Spouse: Elisabeth Strickler (m. 1768)
- Parents: Kaspar Schindler (father); Barbara Tschudi (mother)
- Relatives: Johann Heinrich Schindler (brother)

Abraham Schindler (18 January 1739 – 28 March 1806) was a Swiss merchant, banker and politician from Mollis in the canton of Glarus, a member of the Schindler family. He was Landammann in the Thurgau from 1764 to 1768 and a member of the council from 1769. Around 1782 he and his brother Johann Heinrich founded a manufacturing and banking business in Glarus, whose branch in Lisbon developed into an independent trading house.

== Biography ==
Abraham Schindler was born on 18 January 1739 in Wartau, the son of Kaspar Schindler and Barbara Tschudi. In 1768 he married Elisabeth Strickler, daughter of Heinrich Strickler, a judge (Landrichter).

From 1764 to 1768 Schindler was Landammann in the Thurgau, and from 1769 he was a member of the council (Ratsherr).

Around 1782 Schindler and his brother Johann Heinrich founded a manufacturing and banking business (Manufaktur- und Bankgeschäft) in Glarus, which imported raw cotton and exported printed fabrics. Before 1800 they set up a branch in Lisbon, which developed into an independent trading house. Schindler died on 28 March 1806 in Mollis, now part of the municipality of Glarus Nord.

== Bibliography ==
- J. Winteler, Aus der Geschichte der Familie Schindler von Mollis, 1936, 39, 119
- R. von Arx, Glarner Handelshäuser im 18. Jahrhundert, manuscript, [2002], 21 (Landesarchiv des Kantons Glarus)
