= Nicky Pellegrino =

UK-born New Zealand novelist

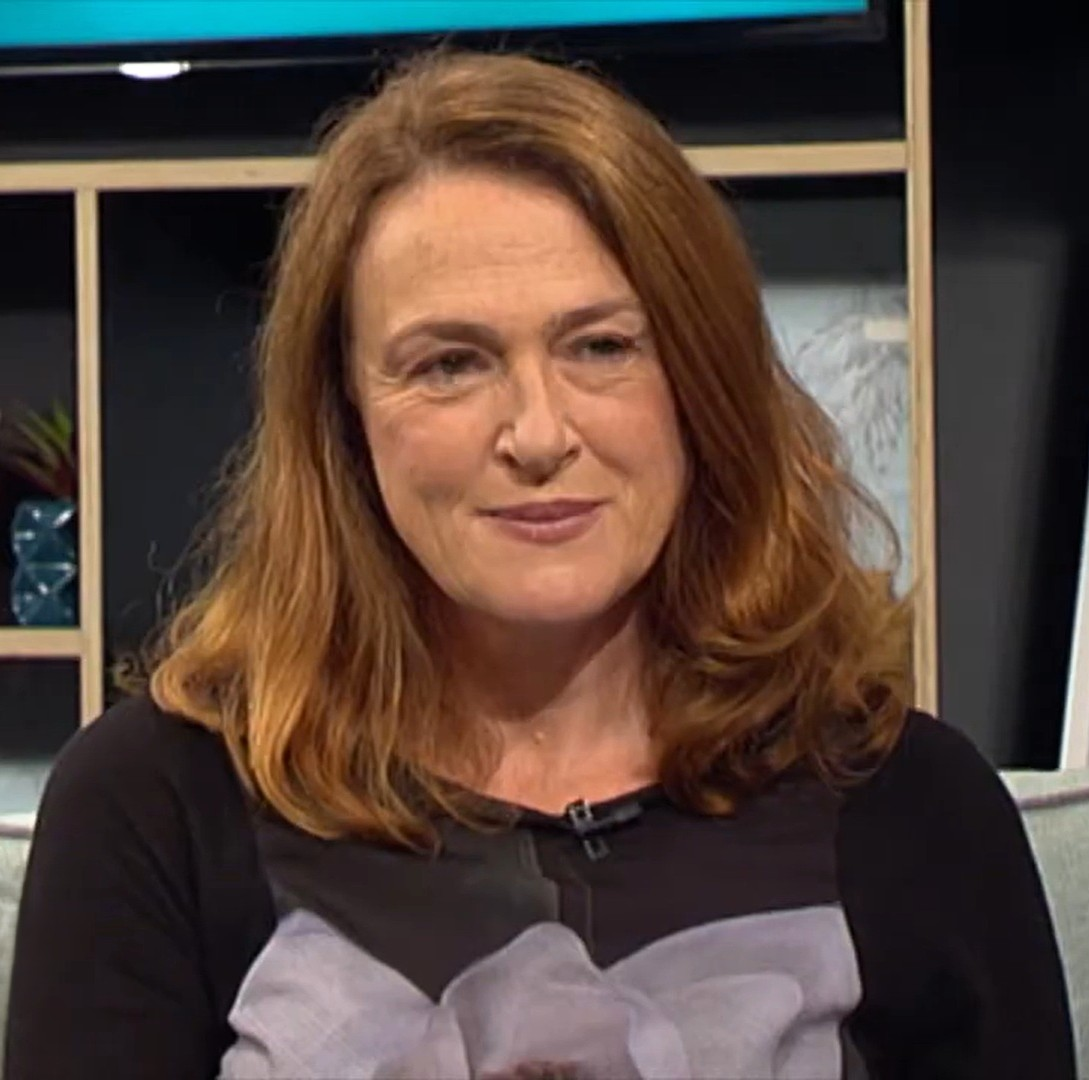
- Pellegrino in 2018
- Born: 1964 (age 61–62); Liverpool, England
- Education: University of Lancaster
- Occupations: Editor, writer, novelist
- Writing career
- Genres: Romance, food

Nicky Pellegrino (born 1964) is a novelist. She is an English-born New Zealander of Italian descent and lives and writes in Auckland, New Zealand. Her novels have been translated into 12 languages.

== Early life ==
Pellegrino was born in Liverpool in the north-west of England to an Italian father and English mother. The family spent summer holidays with her father's siblings in southern Italy, experiences which later became the inspiration for some of her books. She studied English at the University of Lancaster, completing a BA (Honours) degree

== Career ==
After graduating, Pellegrino moved to London and worked on women’s and entertainment magazines. In 1994 she moved to Auckland and became deputy editor, and then editor of New Zealand Woman’s Weekly. She has also worked as the editor of a bridal magazine, and was the books editor for the Herald on Sunday newspaper for seven years. Pellegrino writes articles for the New Zealand Listener, Next Magazine, NZ Gardener and Food Magazine, and has a regular book column in the New Zealand Woman’s Weekly.

She began writing her first novel in 2001, when her friend Angela D'Audney was diagnosed with a brain tumour at the age of 56. Pellegrino was moved to begin on a long-held dream of writing a novel, and wrote Delicious while co-writing D'Audney's autobiography.

In 2020 Pellegrino and fellow author Stacy Gregg co-hosted the podcast BookBubble, interviewing New Zealand writers including Elizabeth Knox, Damien Wilkins, Nalini Singh, Victor Rodger and Tayi Tibble about their lives and work, with a final episode on their own experiences of publishing.

== Publications ==
- Angela: A Wonderful Life! (2001), co-author with Angela D'Audney, Penguin
- Delicious (2005), Orion Books
- Summer at the Villa Rosa (2007), Orion Books
- The Italian Wedding (2009), Orion Books
- Recipe for Life (2010), Orion Books
- The Food of Love Cookery School (2013), Orion Books
- One Summer in Venice (2015), Orion Books
- The Villa Girls (2011), Orion Books
- When in Rome (2012), Orion Books
- Under Italian Skies (2016), Orion Books
- A Dream Of Italy (2019), Orion Books
- Tiny Pieces of Us (2020), Hachette New Zealand
- To Italy, with Love (2021), Orion Books
- P.S. Come to Italy (2023), Orion Books
- Marry Me in Italy (2024), Orion Books
