= Johann Heinrich Schindler =

Swiss merchant and banker (1753–1818)

- Born: 30 December 1753; Mollis, Glarus, Old Swiss Confederacy
- Died: 25 November 1818 (aged 64); Glarus, Switzerland
- Occupations: Merchant, banker
- Spouse: Anna Margaretha Zwicky (m. 1775)
- Parents: Kaspar Schindler (father); Barbara Tschudi (mother)
- Relatives: Abraham Schindler (brother)

Johann Heinrich Schindler (30 December 1753 – 25 November 1818) was a Swiss merchant and banker from Mollis in the canton of Glarus, a member of the Schindler family. Around 1782 he and his brother Abraham founded a manufacturing and banking business in Glarus, which later had a branch in Lisbon.

== Biography ==
Johann Heinrich Schindler was born on 30 December 1753 in Mollis, now part of the municipality of Glarus Nord, the son of Kaspar Schindler and Barbara Tschudi. In 1775 he married Anna Margaretha Zwicky, daughter of the councillor (Ratsherr) Melchior Zwicky.

Schindler was a merchant and banker. Around 1782 he and his brother Abraham founded a manufacturing and banking business (Manufaktur- und Bankgeschäft) in Glarus, which later had a branch in Lisbon. The business imported raw cotton and exported printed cotton goods. Schindler was a member of the council (Ratsherr). He died in Glarus on 25 November 1818.

Two of his sons developed the agency in Lisbon into an independent business and settled in Portugal with their descendants.

== Bibliography ==
- J. Winteler, Aus der Geschichte der Familie Schindler von Mollis, 1936, 39–41, 119 f.
- C. H. Brunner, "'1799 in Glarus': Johann Heinrich Schindlers Auslagen-Rodel", in Jahrbuch des Historischen Vereins des Kantons Glarus, 78, 1998, 108–130
- R. von Arx, Glarner Handelshäuser im 18. Jahrhundert, manuscript, [2002], 21 (Landesarchiv des Kantons Glarus)
