= China's Schindler =

China's Schindler may refer to:

- John Rabe, German businessman who provided refuge for Chinese civilians during the Nanjing Massacre
- Ho Feng-Shan, Chinese diplomat who issued visas to Jews in Nazi controlled Austria allowing them to leave the country

== See also ==
- Schindler (disambiguation)
