= Currie-Foot mission =

1945 Allied negotiations with Switzerland on economic warfare

The Currie–Foot mission (German and French: mission Currie-Foot) was a set of negotiations held in Bern from 12 February to 8 March 1945 between Switzerland and the Western Allies of the Second World War (the United States, United Kingdom, and France). It aimed to halt Swiss economic dealings with Nazi Germany and to neutralize German financial resources in Switzerland. The continued Allied pressure that followed led to the Washington Agreement of 1946.

== Delegations and aims ==
The Swiss delegation was led by William Rappard, with Walter Stucki as its dominant figure. The three Allied delegations were headed by Lauchlin Currie (United States), Dingle Foot (United Kingdom), and Paul Charguéraud (France). The Allies' objective was to cause Swiss deliveries to the Reich to cease, so as to hasten its collapse, and to destroy its financial resources in Switzerland so as to prevent it from rebuilding its strength after the war.

== Outcome ==
Bern agreed to freeze German assets and funds in Switzerland (decision of 16 February), to restrict the transit of goods between Germany and northern Italy, to reduce trade with the Reich to a minimum, and to limit gold purchases to the needs of the German diplomatic services in Switzerland. Switzerland was thus drawn into Allied economic policy. Its neutrality was affected, though Bern was able to avoid declaring war on the Reich. Allied pressure continued and led to the Washington Agreement in 1946.

== Bibliography ==
=== Sources ===
- Foreign Relations of the United States, 1944, vol. V.
- Documents diplomatiques suisses, vols. 15 and 16.

=== Works ===
- M. Durrer, "Les négociations économiques entre Alliés et Suisses à la veille de la défaite du Troisième Reich", in Relations internationales, 30, 1982, pp. 193–207.
- Eizenstat Report, 1997.
- Publications of the Bergier Commission (CIE/UEK), vol. 16.
