= Peter Emil Huber-Werdmüller =

Swiss industrialist

Peter Emil Huber-Werdmüller (24 December 1836 – 4 October 1915) was a Swiss industrialist who founded the engineering company Maschinenfabrik Oerlikon. He was the son of Johann Rudolf Huber, a Zürich silk manufacturer and studied mechanical engineering from 1855 at the Swiss Federal Polytechnic Institute in Zürich. In 1858 he received his diploma as an engineer and then supplemented his knowledge at the Conservatoire National des Arts et Métiers in Paris. He was also in England for a long time, where he was able to acquire more knowledge.

== Career ==
Peter Emil Huber-Werdmüller was born on 24 December 1836 in Zürich. His first employment was with Sulzer Brothers in Winterthur, which was then owned by Charles Brown senior (father of Charles Eugene Lancelot Brown). Afterwards he was able to learn new skills at Escher, Wyss & Cie. in Zürich. In 1863 he established the foundry P. E. Huber & Co. in Oerlikon with the English engineer M. M. Jackson. This business was sold for economic reasons in 1867 to the company Daverio, Siewerdt & Giesker in Rorschach and liquidated in 1872.

In 1876, the Oerlikon tool and machine factory was established and Huber-Werdmüller was appointed president of the board of directors. He drove forward the development of the operation purposefully, incorporated an electrical department in 1884, and appointed Charles Brown senior as its head. Brown brought his two sons, Charles and Sidney, two outstanding engineers, into the factory.

The development of Oerlikon's electrical department had a great impact on technical progress in Switzerland and Europe. In 1886, the discoverer of aluminium fused-salt electrolysis, Paul Louis Toussaint Héroult, ordered a dynamo machine from Oerlikon and, in 1887, he came to Zürich to make electrolytic tests. Huber-Werdmüller, who at an early age recognized the importance of aluminium as a material, saw the immense advantages of Héroult's method. Together with the entrepreneurial personalities Georg Robert Neher and Gustave Naville, President of Escher, Wyss & Cie. in Zürich, he pushed ahead with his idea of an aluminium factory in Neuhausen am Rheinfall.

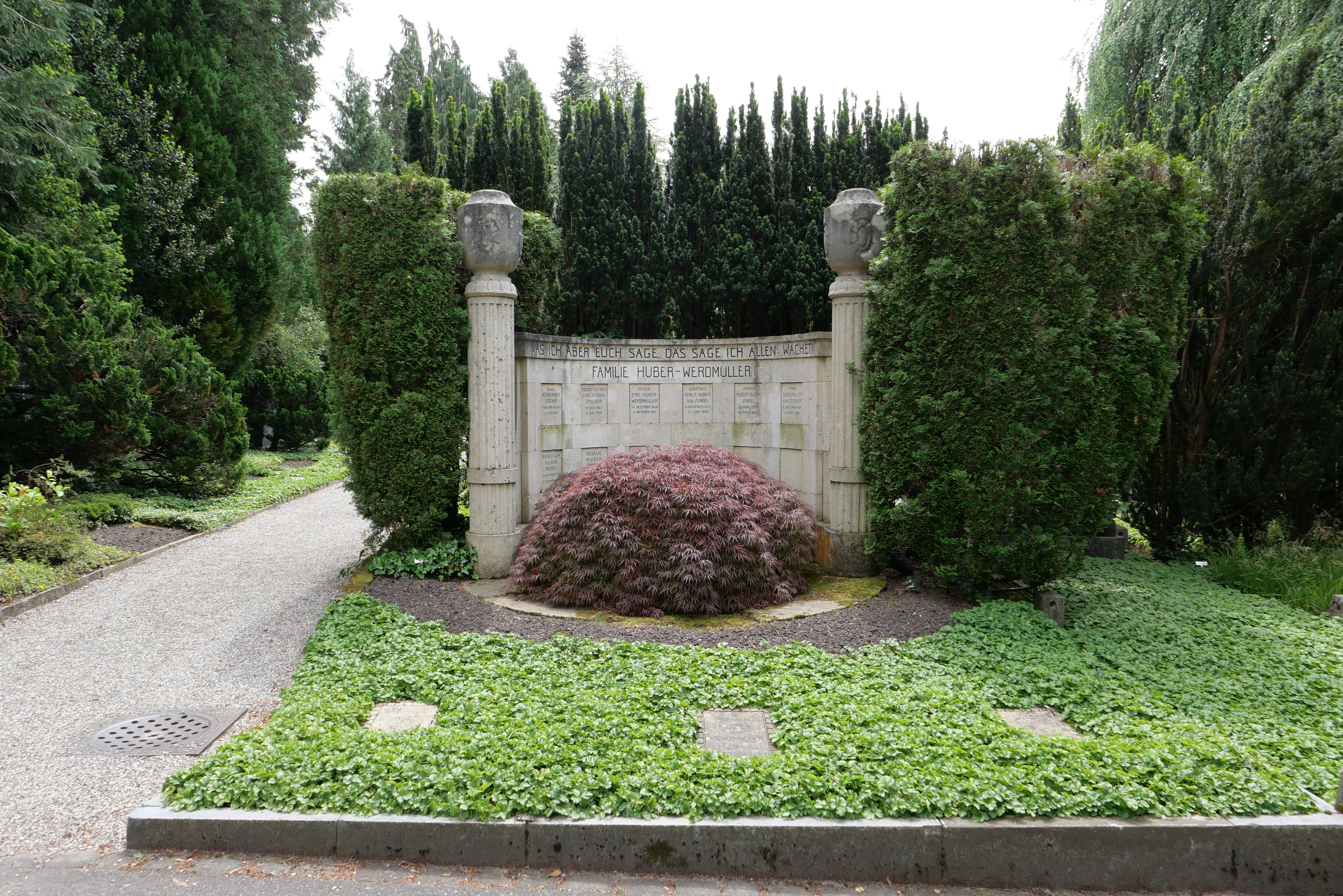
The grave of the Huber-Werdmüller family at the Enzenbühl cemetery in Zürich

The Neher family owned the water rights to the Rhine Falls, which were to be used for power generation, and their former ironworks was used for the infrastructure at this location. Oerlikon, which at that time produced the largest direct current generators in the world, installed them for the large-scale production of electricity necessary for the enormous power requirements of the Héroult process. Escher Wyss & Cie. delivered the water turbines. With other shareholders, the Swiss Metallurgical Society was founded in October 1887, from which the company Aluminium Industrie AG emerged.

Oerlikon had exhibits at the International Electrotechnical Exhibition of 1891 in Frankfurt am Main and supplied generators for the three-phase transmission line from Lauffen to Frankfurt. Later, Huber's son-in-law Dietrich Schindler-Huber took over the management of the company.

== Work in public office ==
As of 1867, Huber's public functions focussed on the development of transport infrastructure in and around Zürich. Starting from the office of the municipal council in the Zürich suburb Riesbach, his birthplace, he sat as a board member of the municipal council and promoted a generous road expansion. He also promoted the construction of a functional quayside on Lake Zurich. As a result of the development of the Seefeld he had to deal with the problems of railway construction and became a member of the Board of Directors of the Swiss Northeast Railway. Huber was significantly involved in the founding of the Uetlibergbahn, where he campaigned, against great resistance, that this route be built as an adhesion railway. Huber was also instrumental in introducing trams to Zürich.

Huber was one of the co-founders of the Swiss Electrotechnical Association (SEV) in 1889 and was appointed an honorary member in 1909.

== Family ==
Huber married Anna Marie Werdmüller in 1864. They had two sons, Emil Huber-Stockar and Max Huber, and a daughter, Anna Barbara Huber, who married Dietrich Schindler.
