= Stacy Gregg =

New Zealand author

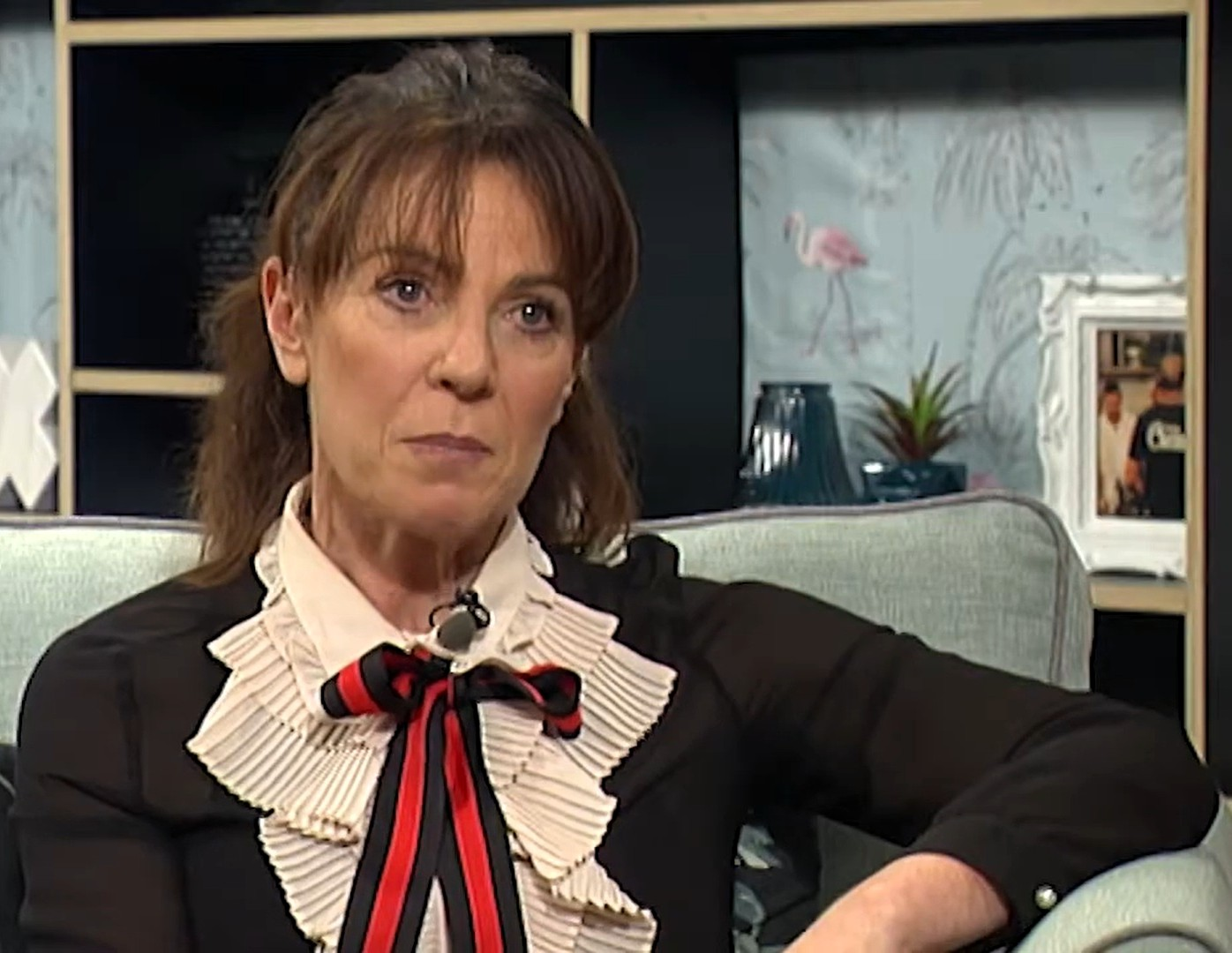
- Gregg in 2018
- Born: 23 July 1968 (age 58); Melbourne, Victoria, Australia
- Occupations: Author, journalist, screenwriter
- Writing career
- Language: English
- Genres: Children's fiction, middle-grade fiction, pony books
- Notable works: Pony Club Secrets; The Princess and the Foal; Nine Girls
- Notable awards: Margaret Mahy Book of the Year (2024); Esther Glen Award (2024)
- Website: www.stacygregg.com

Stacy Gregg (born 23 July 1968) is a New Zealand children's author, screenwriter and former fashion journalist. She is best known for the Pony Club Secrets series of pony novels and her stand-alone novels have won the Children's Choice award at the New Zealand Book Awards for Children and Young Adults three times. Her novel Nine Girls won the 2024 Margaret Mahy Book of the Year and the Esther Glen Award for Junior Fiction.

== Background ==
Gregg was born in Melbourne to New Zealand parents and grew up in Ngāruawāhia. She is of Ngāti Mahuta, Ngāti Pūkeko and Ngāti Maru descent. She attended Woodlands Park Primary and then Ngāruawāhia Primary.

As a child Gregg loved Ruby Ferguson's Jill pony books, Walter Farley's The Black Stallion series and Watership Down. She was also inspired by the New Zealand eventing riders Mark Todd and Blyth Tait.

Gregg has studied te reo Māori at Te Wānanga o Aotearoa, completing the Level 6 immersion diploma Te Aupikitanga ki te Reo Kairangi.

== Career ==
=== Fashion journalist ===
Before and alongside her fiction writing, Gregg worked as a fashion journalist, including for Fashion Quarterly. She reported on New Zealand Fashion Week, as well as London and Sydney fashion weeks and the Paris prêt-à-porter shows. In March 2006 she and advertising creative Michael Lamb launched the fashion website Runway Reporter, which ACP Media acquired that September, with Gregg remaining as editor. In 2009 she appeared as a special guest on the second episode of New Zealand's Next Top Model, credited as editor-at-large of Fashion Quarterly.

=== Children's books ===
Gregg's debut novel, Mystic and the Midnight Ride (2007), was the first in her Pony Club Secrets series. The series ran to 13 books, was followed by the four-book Pony Club Rivals series, and was adapted as the CBBC television series Mystic.

In 2018 Gregg began writing picture books with the Mini Whinny series, illustrated by Ruth Paul and published by Scholastic New Zealand. She has described the series as a close collaboration with Paul. Both Mini Whinny: Happy Birthday to Me! (2018) and Mini Whinny: Goody Four-Shoes (2019) were finalists for the Picture Book Award at the New Zealand Book Awards for Children and Young Adults.

Her middle-grade/junior fiction novel Nine Girls (2024) is set in Ngāruawāhia in the late 1970s and early 1980s and draws on her own upbringing and family history. It won both the Margaret Mahy Book of the Year and the Esther Glen Award for Junior Fiction at the 2024 New Zealand Book Awards for Children and Young Adults.

Gregg has sold more than 1.5 million books and is HarperCollins New Zealand's third best-selling children's author, after David Walliams and Dr. Seuss.

=== Additional work ===
Gregg's screenwriting credits include Mystic and the Acorn TV series My Life Is Murder, starring Lucy Lawless.

In 2020 Gregg and fellow author Nicky Pellegrino co-hosted the podcast BookBubble, interviewing New Zealand writers including Elizabeth Knox, Damien Wilkins, Nalini Singh, Victor Rodger and Tayi Tibble about their lives and work, with a final episode on their own experiences of publishing.

== Personal life ==
Gregg lives in Herne Bay, Auckland, with her daughter and is an avid equestrian.

== Awards and nominations ==
Year	Award	Category	Work	Result
2014	New Zealand Post Book Awards for Children and Young Adults	Children's Choice, Junior Fiction	The Princess and the Foal	Won
2015	New Zealand Post Book Awards for Children and Young Adults	Children's Choice, Junior Fiction	The Island of Lost Horses	Won
2016	New Zealand Book Awards for Children and Young Adults	Children's Choice, Junior Fiction	The Girl Who Rode the Wind	Won
2016	Nene Award	–	The Princess and the Foal	Nominated
2016–17	William Allen White Children's Book Award	–	The Princess and the Foal	Nominated
2018	New Zealand Book Awards for Children and Young Adults	Esther Glen Award for Junior Fiction	The Thunderbolt Pony	Finalist
2019	Storylines Notable Book Awards	Notable Junior Fiction	The Fire Stallion	Won
2019	Storylines Notable Book Awards	Notable Picture Book	Mini Whinny: Happy Birthday to Me!	Won
2019	New Zealand Book Awards for Children and Young Adults	Picture Book	Mini Whinny: Happy Birthday to Me!	Finalist
2020	New Zealand Book Awards for Children and Young Adults	Esther Glen Award for Junior Fiction	Prince of Ponies	Finalist
2020	New Zealand Book Awards for Children and Young Adults	Picture Book	Mini Whinny: Goody Four-Shoes	Finalist
2023	Voyager Media Awards	–	"The Māoris From the Town Side of the River" (The Spinoff)	Won
2024	New Zealand Book Awards for Children and Young Adults	Margaret Mahy Book of the Year	Nine Girls	Won
2024	New Zealand Book Awards for Children and Young Adults	Esther Glen Award for Junior Fiction	Nine Girls	Won
2024	Storylines Notable Book Awards	Notable Junior Fiction	Nine Girls	Won
2025	NZ Booklovers Awards	Best Junior Fiction Book	Nine Girls	Shortlisted
2025	Historical Association Young Quills Award	Readers aged 11–13	Nine Girls	Shortlisted

== Bibliography ==
Pony Club Secrets (HarperCollins)
Year	No.	Title	Notes
2007	1	Mystic and the Midnight Ride	Debut novel
2007	2	Blaze and the Dark Rider	
2008	3	Destiny and the Wild Horses	
2008	4	Stardust and the Daredevil Ponies	
2008	5	Comet and the Champion's Cup	
2008	–	Issie and the Christmas Pony	Special edition
2009	6	Storm and the Silver Bridle	
2009	7	Fortune and the Golden Trophy	
2009	8	Victory and the All-Stars Academy	
2010	9	Flame and the Rebel Riders	
2010	10	Angel and the Flying Stallions	
2011	11	Liberty and the Dream Ride	
2011	12	Nightstorm and the Grand Slam	

Pony Club Rivals (HarperCollins)
Year	No.	Title	Notes
2010	1	The Auditions	
2010	2	Showjumpers	
2011	3	Riding Star	
2011	4	The Prize	

Stand-alone novels
Year	Title	Publisher	Notes
2013	The Princess and the Foal	HarperCollins	Children's Choice Junior Fiction, NZ Post Book Awards 2014
2014	The Island of Lost Horses	HarperCollins	Children's Choice Junior Fiction, NZ Post Book Awards 2015
2015	The Girl Who Rode the Wind	HarperCollins	Children's Choice Junior Fiction, NZ Book Awards 2016
2016	The Diamond Horse	HarperCollins	
2017	The Thunderbolt Pony	HarperCollins	Finalist, Esther Glen Award for Junior Fiction 2018
2018	The Fire Stallion	HarperCollins	Storylines Notable Book 2019
2019	Prince of Ponies	HarperCollins	Finalist, Junior Fiction, NZ Book Awards 2020
2020	The Forever Horse	HarperCollins	
2024	Nine Girls	Penguin Random House	Margaret Mahy Book of the Year and Esther Glen Award for Junior Fiction 2024
2025	The Last Journey	Simon & Schuster	

Spellbound Ponies (HarperCollins)
Year	No.	Title	Notes
2021	1	Magic and Mischief	
2021	2	Sugar and Spice	
2021	3	Wishes and Weddings	
2021	4	Fortune and Cookies	
2021	5	Rainbows and Ribbons	
2021	6	Dancing and Dreams	

Picture books
Year	Title	Publisher	Notes
2018	Mini Whinny: Happy Birthday to Me!	Scholastic	Illustrated by Ruth Paul; Storylines Notable Book
2019	Mini Whinny: Goody Four-Shoes	Scholastic	Illustrated by Ruth Paul
2023	In or Out: A Tale of Cat versus Dog	HarperCollins	Illustrated by Sarah Jennings
2024	The Easter Bunny Hunt	HarperCollins	Illustrated by Sarah Jennings
