= Kaspar Schindler (died 1836) =

Swiss politician (1761–1836)

- Born: 3 August 1761; Mollis, Glarus, Old Swiss Confederacy
- Died: 5 February 1836 (aged 74); Mollis, Glarus, Switzerland
- Occupation: Politician
- Spouses: Susanna Barbara Stäger (m. 1781) Susanna Margaretha Lindheimer (m. 1801)
- Parents: Fridolin Schindler (father); Anna Zwicky (mother)
- Relatives: Konrad Schindler (brother); Dietrich Schindler (son-in-law)

Kaspar Schindler (3 August 1761 – 5 February 1836) was a Swiss politician from Mollis in the canton of Glarus. A supporter of the Ancien Régime, he organized the resistance against the French in 1798 and opposed the unitary state of the Helvetic Republic. He was master of the arsenal, a member of the council and head of the commune of Mollis, and in 1816 he co-founded the Protestant Aid Society.

== Biography ==
Kaspar Schindler was born on 3 August 1761 in Mollis, now part of the municipality of Glarus Nord, the son of Fridolin Schindler, master of the arsenal (Zeugherr), and Anna Zwicky. His brother was Konrad Schindler. In 1781 he married Susanna Barbara Stäger, daughter of Andreas Stäger, Schultheiss of Lichtensteig. In 1801 he married Susanna Margaretha Lindheimer of Frankfurt am Main, daughter of the merchant Georg Lindheimer. His daughter Maria Georgia married Dietrich Schindler in 1826.

Schindler was educated at the Philanthropinum in Marschlins and at Pfeffel's military school (Pfeffel'sche Kriegsschule) in Colmar. From 1784 to 1798 and from 1803 to 1821 he was master of the arsenal and worked on the reorganization of the military system (Wehrwesen).

As a supporter of the Ancien Régime, Schindler organized the resistance against the French in 1798, and he was an opponent of the Helvetic unitary state. During the Helvetic period he was president of the municipality (Munizipalpräsident) of Mollis, and in 1799 he became banneret (Pannerherr). From 1803 to 1821 he was a member of the council (Ratsherr), and he was head of the commune (Gemeindevorsteher) of Mollis.

In 1816 Schindler co-founded the Protestant Aid Society (Evangelische Hilfsgesellschaft). He supported the settlement of the Linth plain and the school for the poor of the Linth colony (Armenschule Linthkolonie). He owned Grünenstein Castle near Balgach. He died in Mollis on 5 February 1836.

== Bibliography ==
- J. Winteler, Aus der Geschichte der Familie Schindler von Mollis, 1936, 89–95, 183
- H. Thürer, Geschichte der Gemeinde Mollis, 1954, 107, 147
