= Kaspar Schindler (philanthropist) =

Swiss philanthropist (1828–1902)

- Born: 2 August 1828; Mollis, Glarus, Switzerland
- Died: 15 May 1902 (aged 73); Zurich, Switzerland
- Occupations: Silk manufacturer; philanthropist
- Spouse: Elise Escher (m. 1853)
- Children: Friedrich Martin Schindler; Samuel Dietrich Schindler
- Father: Dietrich Schindler
- Relatives: Samuel Schindler (grandfather)

Kaspar Schindler (2 August 1828 – 15 May 1902) was a Swiss silk manufacturer and philanthropist in Zurich. He trained as an agronomist and was Austro-Hungarian consul from 1872 to 1885. He supported charitable institutions and disaster relief, and he saw the welfare of broad sections of the population as the solution to the social question.

== Biography ==
Kaspar Schindler was born on 2 August 1828 in Mollis, now part of the municipality of Glarus Nord, the son of Dietrich Schindler. In 1853 he married Elise Escher, daughter of Martin Escher. He was a grandson of Samuel Schindler.

Schindler studied on a country estate near Augsburg and at the agricultural academy in Hohenheim near Stuttgart, and in 1849 he qualified as an agronomist. He traveled to Scotland and spent time at the agricultural school in Altenburg, Hungary.

Schindler was a silk manufacturer in Zurich. From 1872 to 1885 he was Austro-Hungarian consul. As a philanthropist he supported charitable institutions and relief efforts after disasters. He saw the welfare of broad sections of the population as the solution to the social question and as one of the main tasks of the entrepreneur, and so he encouraged the building of owner-occupied homes for workers as the basis of a healthy family life. He wrote several works, including texts on drainage, on the use of bone meal and on American vines. He held the rank of major.

His sons Friedrich Martin Schindler and Samuel Dietrich Schindler left the textile industry. Schindler died in Zurich on 15 May 1902.

== Bibliography ==
- J. Winteler, Landammann Dietrich Schindler, seine Vorfahren und Nachkommen, 1932, 191–205
