= Amy Shindler =

British actress and television writer

Amy Shindler is a British actress and television writer best known for her portrayal of Brenda Tucker in the UK's long running soap opera, The Archers.

== Early life ==
Shindler grew up in North London and then studied history at the University of Cambridge. She is the daughter of the author and historian, Colin Shindler and cousin of the television producer, Nicola Shindler.

== Career ==
=== Acting ===
She joined The Archers shortly after leaving drama school and played Brenda Tucker until her departure from Ambridge in 2014, returning for a short stint in 2024 to help sell the house that her brother, Roy, owned. Brenda was notable in the show for her struggles with her boss, Matt Crawford, her long engagement to Tom Archer and her decision not to have children in order to devote herself to her career. Shindler also appeared in the feature film A Mighty Heart playing Michelle Pearl, and played Charlotte Fox in the feature film Everest.

=== Writing ===
Shindler's television writing career began on the hit BBC1 comedy, My Family. Since then she has had her own sitcom series Pat and Cabbage on ITV1 with sometime writing partner, Beth Chalmers, and has written on comedies such as Threesome, Trollied and Horrible Histories. She and Chalmers are the creators, writers and executive producers of three series of the New Zealand based drama, Mystic, broadcast on CBBC in 2021 and 2022. The series has sold in over 40 countries worldwide and won awards for Best Children's Programme at the Asian Academy Creative Awards in 2022; and Best Children's Programme at the NZTV awards in 2023 . Shindler and Chalmers then became regular writers on the crime drama Patience, an English-language adaptation of the French series Astrid and Raphaelle.

Shindler is also an author and playwright. In 2012 she was invited on BBC Radio 4’s Loose Ends to discuss an erotic spoof book, Fifty Shelves of Grey, which she co-authored with three other writers under the pseudonym, ‘Vanessa Parody’.

In September 2016 her first play, Burning Bridges, was premiered at Theatre 503. The play drew the attention of the press for its timely exploration of a young woman with Asperger syndrome and was nominated for three 2017 Offies including Best Play.
