= Konrad Schindler (died 1809) =

Swiss physician (1734–1809)

- Born: 19 July 1734; Mollis, Glarus, Old Swiss Confederacy
- Died: 1 November 1809 (aged 75); Mollis, Glarus, Switzerland
- Occupations: Physician, politician
- Spouses: Elsbeth Elmer (m. 1760) Anna Margaretha Zwicky (m. 1767)
- Parents: Jakob Schindler (father); Anna Katharina Zwicky (mother)
- Relatives: Kaspar Schindler (brother)

Konrad Schindler (19 July 1734 – 1 November 1809) was a Swiss physician and politician from Mollis in the canton of Glarus. A member of the council from 1767 to 1798, he advocated reforms in agriculture and promoted the potato, and in 1798 he fought against the introduction of the unitary constitution of the Helvetic Republic.

== Biography ==
Konrad Schindler was born on 19 July 1734 in Mollis, now part of the municipality of Glarus Nord, the son of Jakob Schindler, a pastor, and Anna Katharina Zwicky. His brother was Kaspar Schindler. In 1760 he married Elsbeth Elmer, daughter of the judge Jakob Elmer, and in 1767 he married Anna Margaretha Zwicky, daughter of the pastor Johann Heinrich Zwicky.

From 1750 Schindler studied medicine in Basel, and he received his doctorate in 1755. He worked as a physician and was a substitute councillor (Ratssubstitut). In 1766 he became a judge of the consistory (Chorrichter), and from 1767 to 1798 he was a member of the council (Ratsherr).

Schindler deplored the adverse effects of cottage industry (Heimarbeit). He advocated reforms in agriculture, more self-sufficiency, the distribution of common land (Allmend) for planting, the protection of the forests, and the promotion of arable farming, fodder growing and the use of fertilizer, and he promoted the potato. Politically conservative, he fought against the introduction of the unitary constitution in 1798. He died in Mollis on 1 November 1809.

== Bibliography ==
- J. Winteler, Aus der Geschichte der Familie Schindler von Mollis, 1936, 57–66, 175
