= Colin Shindler =

English social historian and author

Colin Shindler (born 1949) is an English author, social historian and affiliated lecturer in history at Cambridge University.

== Life and career ==
Born in Manchester, Colin Shindler grew up in Prestwich. He graduated with a degree in history from Gonville and Caius College, Cambridge, where he later completed his PhD thesis on Hollywood and the Great Depression. Since 1998 he has been lecturing and teaching at Cambridge on films and American history.

Shindler has written numerous books on British and American cultural history, with an emphasis on the impact of sport and film on modern society. Manchester United Ruined My Life (1998) and Manchester City Ruined My Life (2012) are a pair of memoirs about his support for Manchester City. He also wrote the screenplay for the 1988 film Buster and worked as a scriptwriter and television producer in England between 1977 and 1996, for shows including Lovejoy, Juliet Bravo, and Heartbeat.

Shindler is the brother of lawyer Geoffrey Shindler and the uncle of television producer Nicola Shindler. His daughter is the actress Amy Shindler.

Shindler should not be confused with the English academic and historian Colin Shindler, born in 1946, who specialises in the history of modern Israel.

== Books ==
=== Nonfiction ===
- Hollywood Goes to War: Films and American Society, 1939–1952 (1979)
- Hollywood in Crisis: Cinema and American Society, 1929–1939 (1996)
- Fathers, Sons and Football (2001)
- George Best and 21 Others (2004)
- Garbo and Gilbert in Love: Hollywood's First Great Celebrity Couple (2005)
- National Service: From Aldershot to Aden: Tales from the Conscripts, 1946–62 (2012)
- The Professional Amateur: The Cricketing Life of Bob Barber (2015)
- Four Lions: The Lives and Times of Four Captains of England (2016)
- Barbed Wire and Cucumber Sandwiches: The Controversial South African Tour of 1970 (2020)

=== Fiction ===
- Buster: A Novel Based on His Own Original Screenplay (1988)
- High on a Cliff (1999)
- First Love, Second Chance (2002)
- The Worst of Friends: Malcolm Allison, Joe Mercer and Manchester City (2009)
- The Worst of Friends: The Betrayal of Joe Mercer (2011)

=== Memoirs ===
- Manchester United Ruined My Life (1998)
- Manchester City Ruined My Life (2012)

=== Edited ===
- I'm Sure I Speak for Many Others ... : Unpublished Letters to the BBC (2017)
