= Konrad Schindler (died 1841) =

Swiss politician (1757–1841)

- Born: 28 September 1757; Mollis, Glarus, Old Swiss Confederacy
- Died: 3 February 1841 (aged 83); Mollis, Glarus, Switzerland
- Occupation: Politician
- Spouse: Dorothea Zwicky (m. 1776)
- Parents: Fridolin Schindler (father); Anna Zwicky (mother)
- Relatives: Kaspar Schindler (brother)

Konrad Schindler (28 September 1757 – 3 February 1841) was a Swiss politician from Mollis in the canton of Glarus. Besides Hans Conrad Escher, he was the most zealous promoter of the Linth project (Linthwerk), and he took over its overall direction after Escher's death in 1823. He built the manor houses Haltli and Hof in Mollis.

== Biography ==
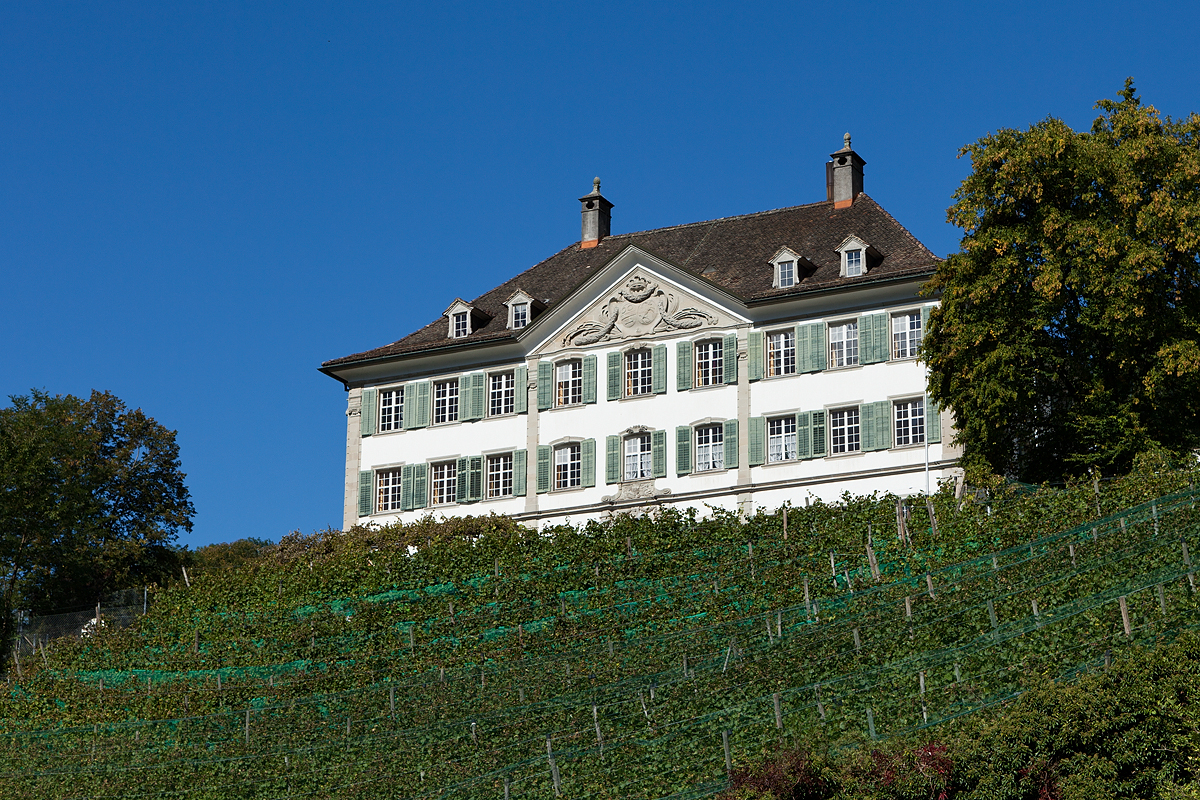
The Haltli manor house in Mollis

Konrad Schindler was born on 28 September 1757 in Mollis, now part of the municipality of Glarus Nord, the son of Fridolin Schindler, master of the arsenal (Zeugherr), and Anna Zwicky. His brother was Kaspar Schindler. In 1776 he married Dorothea Zwicky, daughter of the pastor Johann Heinrich Zwicky.

Schindler attended the Philanthropinum in Haldenstein and Pfeffel's military academy (Pfeffel'sche Kriegsakademie) in Colmar, and he studied architecture in Paris. He built the manor houses (Herrensitze) Haltli and Hof in Mollis.

In 1791 Schindler became a member of the council (Ratsherr), and in 1798–1799 he was president of the administrative chamber (Verwaltungskammer) of the canton of Linth. In 1800 he was elected to the cantonal education council (Erziehungsrat). In 1802 he was a member of the assembly of notables (Notabelnversammlung) and of the constitutional council for the canton of Glarus, and in 1803 he took part in introducing the constitution of the Act of Mediation in Glarus. In 1803–1804 he was a judge of the court of nine (Neunerrichter), and from 1820 to 1830 he was director of roads (Strassendirektor); in that period the canton's first road that was modern by the standards of the time was built, from Näfels to Oberurnen.

Besides Hans Conrad Escher, Schindler was the most zealous promoter of the Linth project, and after Escher's death in 1823 he took over the overall direction of the project. In 1816 he co-founded the Protestant Aid Society (Evangelische Hilfsgesellschaft). Schindler, who was open to the ideas of the French Revolution, did much for the settlement of the Linth plain, for the school for the poor of the Linth colony (Armenschule Linthkolonie) and for the intensification of arable farming. He died in Mollis on 3 February 1841.

== Bibliography ==
- J. Winteler, Aus der Geschichte der Familie Schindler von Mollis, 1936, 67–88, 182
- Schindler, Escher und das "Haltly", 2000
- D. Speich, Helvetische Meliorationen, 2003
