= Kaspar Schindler (died 1791) =

Swiss politician (1717–1791)

- Pencil drawing by Johann Caspar Waser, c. 1784
- Born: 13 September 1717; Mollis, Glarus, Old Swiss Confederacy
- Died: 9 July 1791 (aged 73); Mollis, Glarus, Old Swiss Confederacy
- Occupations: Politician, military officer
- Spouses: Barbara Tschudi (m. 1737) Maria Magdalena Heer (m. 1766)
- Children: Abraham Schindler; Johann Heinrich Schindler
- Parents: Jakob Schindler (father); Anna Katharina Zwicky (mother)
- Relatives: Konrad Schindler (brother)

Kaspar Schindler (13 September 1717 – 9 July 1791) was a Swiss politician and officer from Mollis in the canton of Glarus. A captain in Sardinian service, he was Landammann in the Thurgau from 1757 to 1764 and twice Landammann of Glarus, in 1766–1769 and 1776–1779, and he represented Glarus at the Federal Diet.

== Biography ==
Kaspar Schindler was born on 13 September 1717 in Mollis, now part of the municipality of Glarus Nord, the son of Jakob Schindler, a pastor, and Anna Katharina Zwicky. His brother was Konrad Schindler. In 1737 he married Barbara Tschudi, daughter of the pastor Johann Heinrich Tschudi, and in 1766 he married Maria Magdalena Heer, daughter of Joachim Heer, captain of the Land (Landeshauptmann). His sons with Barbara Tschudi, Abraham and Johann Heinrich, were merchants and bankers.

In 1744 Schindler was a captain in the service of the Kingdom of Sardinia and owned a company. From 1745 to 1747 he took part in the War of the Austrian Succession as commander of the second Protestant company of Glarus (evangelische Standeskompanie).

From 1757 to 1764 Schindler was Landammann in the Thurgau. He was deputy Landammann (Landesstatthalter) of Glarus in 1764 and 1774, and Landammann of Glarus in 1766–1769 and 1776–1779. In 1764–1768 and 1774–1778 he was an envoy to the Federal Diet (Tagsatzung), and in 1777 he was the envoy to Solothurn for the swearing of the alliance with France. From 1782 to 1784 he was bailiff (Landvogt) in the Thurgau.

Schindler's terms of office saw the Landsgemeindes of 1765 and 1766, which were accompanied by tumults over the approval of new companies and over the reorganization of the postal messenger service respectively. He died in Mollis on 9 July 1791.

== Bibliography ==
- J. J. Kubly-Müller, "Die Landammänner von Glarus 1242–1928", in Jahrbuch des Historischen Vereins des Kantons Glarus, 47, 1934, 213–218
- J. Winteler, Aus der Geschichte der Familie Schindler von Mollis, 1936, 34–39, 171
