= Samuel Dietrich Schindler =

Swiss industrialist (1856–1936)

- Born: 22 July 1856; Zurich, Switzerland
- Died: 22 September 1936 (aged 80); Zurich, Switzerland
- Occupations: Industrialist; politician
- Spouse: Anna Barbara Huber (m. 1888)
- Children: Dietrich Schindler
- Father: Kaspar Schindler
- Relatives: Friedrich Martin Schindler (brother); Peter Emil Huber-Werdmüller (father-in-law)

Samuel Dietrich Schindler (22 July 1856 – 22 September 1936) was a Swiss industrialist from Zurich. A silk gauze manufacturer, in 1903 he became commercial director of Maschinenfabrik Oerlikon, the company founded by his father-in-law Peter Emil Huber-Werdmüller, and he was its general director from 1911 to 1935. From 1904 to 1914 he sat in the Cantonal Council of Zurich for the Free Democratic Party.

== Biography ==
Samuel Dietrich Schindler was born in Zurich on 22 July 1856, the son of Kaspar Schindler. His brother was Friedrich Martin Schindler. In 1888 he married Anna Barbara Huber, daughter of Peter Emil Huber-Werdmüller. He was the brother-in-law of Emil Huber-Stockar (1865–1939) and of Max Huber. His son was the jurist Dietrich Schindler.

Schindler was a manufacturer of silk gauze. In 1903 he became commercial director (kaufmännischer Leiter) of Maschinenfabrik Oerlikon, which his father-in-law had founded, and from 1911 to 1935 he was its general director. From 1889 to 1926 he sat on the board of the Zurich Chamber of Commerce (Zürcher Handelskammer). He presided over the Zurich Silk Industry Association (Zürcher Seidenindustriegesellschaft), was vice-president of the Swiss Association of Machinery Manufacturers (Verein Schweizerischer Maschinenindustrieller) from 1915 and, from 1918 to 1926, vice-president of the Swiss Federation of Commerce and Industry.

From 1904 to 1914 Schindler represented the Free Democratic Party in the Cantonal Council of Zurich. In 1919 he was a Swiss delegate to the first International Labour Conference in Washington. In 1931 he received an honorary doctorate from ETH Zurich. He held the rank of colonel. He died in Zurich on 22 September 1936.

== Bibliography ==
- J. Winteler, Landammann Dietrich Schindler, seine Vorfahren und Nachkommen, 1932, 206–217
- Glarner Nachrichten, 23 September 1936
