= Schindelholz =

Schindelholz is a surname. Notable people with the surname include:

- Jean-Claude Schindelholz (born 1940), Swiss football player
- Lorenz Schindelholz (born 1966), Swiss bobsledder
- Nicolas Schindelholz (1988–2022), Swiss football player
