= Samuel Schindler (manufacturer) =

Swiss textile manufacturer (1762–1830)

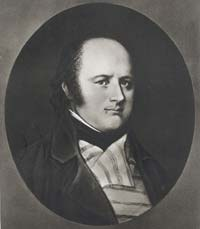
- Born: 17 November 1762; Mollis, Glarus, Old Swiss Confederacy
- Died: 1 November 1830 (aged 67); Hard, Vorarlberg, Austrian Empire
- Occupations: Weaver; manufacturer
- Spouses: Barbara Schmid; Elisabeth Elmer
- Children: Dietrich Schindler
- Parents: Fridolin Schindler (father); Magdalena Zopfi (mother)
- Relatives: Kaspar Schindler (grandson)

Samuel Schindler (17 November 1762 – 1 November 1830) was a Swiss textile manufacturer from Mollis in the canton of Glarus. A weaver who became a manufacturer, he owned an extensive hand-weaving and trading business and in 1825 founded the firm Jenny & Schindler in Hard with his son-in-law Melchior Jenny. In Glarus he was a member of the council and of the criminal court, and he opposed the death penalty.

== Biography ==
Samuel Schindler was born on 17 November 1762 in Mollis, now part of the municipality of Glarus Nord, the son of Fridolin Schindler, a weaver, and Magdalena Zopfi. He married first Barbara Schmid, daughter of the tax collector (Steuervogt) Dietrich Schmid, and then Elisabeth Elmer, daughter of the master tanner Johann Rudolf Elmer.

Schindler was a weaver and then a manufacturer. In Glarus he was a member of the council (Ratsherr), a judge of the consistory (Chorrichter) and a member of the criminal court, and he was an opponent of the death penalty.

At the beginning of the 19th century Schindler rose to become the owner of an extensive hand-weaving and trading business that included a yarn trade. Around 1820 he planned a cotton and silk weaving mill in Mollis, and in 1825, with his son-in-law Melchior Jenny, he founded the cotton and wool printing firm Jenny & Schindler in Hard. He died in Hard on 1 November 1830. In 1833 the firm expanded to Mittelweiherburg in the municipality of Hard, and a spinning mill was built in Kennelbach in 1836 and a mechanical weaving mill in Liebenstein in 1850, both in Vorarlberg.

His son Dietrich Schindler became Landammann of Glarus, and his grandson Kaspar Schindler was a silk manufacturer in Zurich. Some of Samuel Schindler's descendants moved their businesses to Vorarlberg, among them Friedrich Wilhelm Schindler.

== Bibliography ==
- J. Winteler, Landammann Dietrich Schindler, seine Vorfahren und Nachkommen, 1932, 42–51
- F. Mathis, Big Business in Österreich, 1, 1987, 165–167
