= Washington Agreement (1946) =

1946 Swiss–Allied postwar financial settlement

The Washington Agreement (German: Washingtoner Abkommen; French: accord de Washington) was a postwar financial settlement signed on 25 May 1946 between Switzerland and the Western Allies of the Second World War (the United States, United Kingdom, and France), resolving disputes arising from Switzerland's economic and financial dealings with the Axis powers during the war.

== Background and negotiations ==
Toward the end of the Second World War, the Allies voiced increasingly sharp criticism of Switzerland's economic and financial relations with the Axis powers. Some of the disputes were resolved by the Currie-Foot mission to Bern, but Allied pressure continued. Negotiations beginning in March 1946 between the Swiss delegation led by Walter Stucki and American, British, and French representatives culminated in the conclusion of the Washington Agreement on 25 May 1946.

== Terms ==
Under the agreement, Switzerland undertook to pay 250 million francs toward the reconstruction of Europe. In return, the Allies renounced any further claims relating to the wartime activities of the Swiss National Bank, whose dealings—particularly the purchase of gold looted by the Reich—had been contested. Switzerland further agreed to register German assets in Switzerland that had been frozen since 16 February 1945, and to liquidate assets in Switzerland held by Germans resident in Germany. Half of the resulting proceeds was to go to Swiss war victims and half to the reconstruction of Europe. The Allies, for their part, agreed to lift the "blacklists" of natural and legal persons that had engaged in economic relations with the Axis. The United States also agreed to release Swiss assets that had been blocked there since 1941.

== Assessment and aftermath ==
William Emmanuel Rappard, an adviser to the Swiss delegation, called the agreement a "diplomatic miracle," since the Western Allies had given up much of their harsh demands. Switzerland had used its industrial and financial capacity to supply France and the United Kingdom, which moderated their claims. The international context—the beginning of the Cold War—also lessened Western Allied pressure. Thanks to the agreement, Switzerland was able to overcome its international isolation, and was able to preserve banking secrecy.

The implementation of the agreement proved long, complicated, and incomplete. An unpublished letter forming part of the agreement provided that Switzerland would examine "with goodwill" the question of dormant assets in Switzerland belonging to victims of the Nazis. This commitment, however, met with resistance from the banks, which defended banking secrecy. Despite partial measures adopted by the Parliament in 1962, only at the end of the Cold War and in the 1990s were thorough investigations carried out and questions of restitution taken up.

== Bibliography ==
- L. von Castelmur, Schweizerisch-alliierte Finanzbeziehungen im Übergang vom Zweiten Weltkrieg zum kalten Krieg, 2nd ed. 1997.
- Publications of the Bergier Commission (CIE/UEK), vols. 10, 13, 15, 16, 18, and 19.
- M. Perrenoud, Banquiers et diplomates suisses (1938–1946), 2011.
