= Dietrich Schindler (jurist, born 1890) =

Swiss jurist (1890–1948)

- Born: 3 December 1890; Zurich, Switzerland
- Died: 10 January 1948 (aged 57); Zurich, Switzerland
- Occupations: Jurist; professor; politician
- Spouse: Gisela Mina Amsler (m. 1922)
- Children: Dietrich Schindler
- Father: Samuel Dietrich Schindler

Dietrich Schindler (3 December 1890 – 10 January 1948) was a Swiss jurist. He was professor of constitutional and administrative law, later also of international law and legal philosophy, at the University of Zurich. For many years he was legal adviser to the Federal Council, and he wrote important expert opinions on neutrality policy during the Second World War.

== Biography ==
Dietrich Schindler was born in Zurich, the son of Samuel Dietrich Schindler. In 1922 he married Gisela Mina Amsler. He was the father of the jurist Dietrich Schindler.

From 1909 Schindler studied law in Zurich, Leipzig and Berlin. He obtained his doctorate in 1916 and his habilitation in 1921, when he became a Privatdozent. At the University of Zurich he became associate professor (ausserordentlicher Professor) in 1927 and full professor in 1936 of constitutional and administrative law, later also of international law and legal philosophy. For many years he was legal adviser to the Federal Council, and he wrote important expert opinions on neutrality policy during the Second World War.

As a member of the Free Democratic Party, Schindler sat in the Grand City Council (Grosser Stadtrat) of Zurich and in the Cantonal Council of Zurich. From 1940 he chaired the board of directors (Verwaltungskomitee) of the Neue Zürcher Zeitung. In 1946 he was a delegate at the negotiations on the Washington Agreement. He was a member of the International Committee of the Red Cross and held the rank of colonel. He died in Zurich on 10 January 1948.

== Bibliography ==
- D. Schindler, Ein Schweizer Staats- und Völkerrechtler der Krisen- und Kriegszeit, 2005

=== Archives ===
- Archiv für Zeitgeschichte, Zurich (papers)
