= Maschinenfabrik Oerlikon =

Swiss engineering company (1876-1967)

Coordinates: 47.4125°N 8.541°E

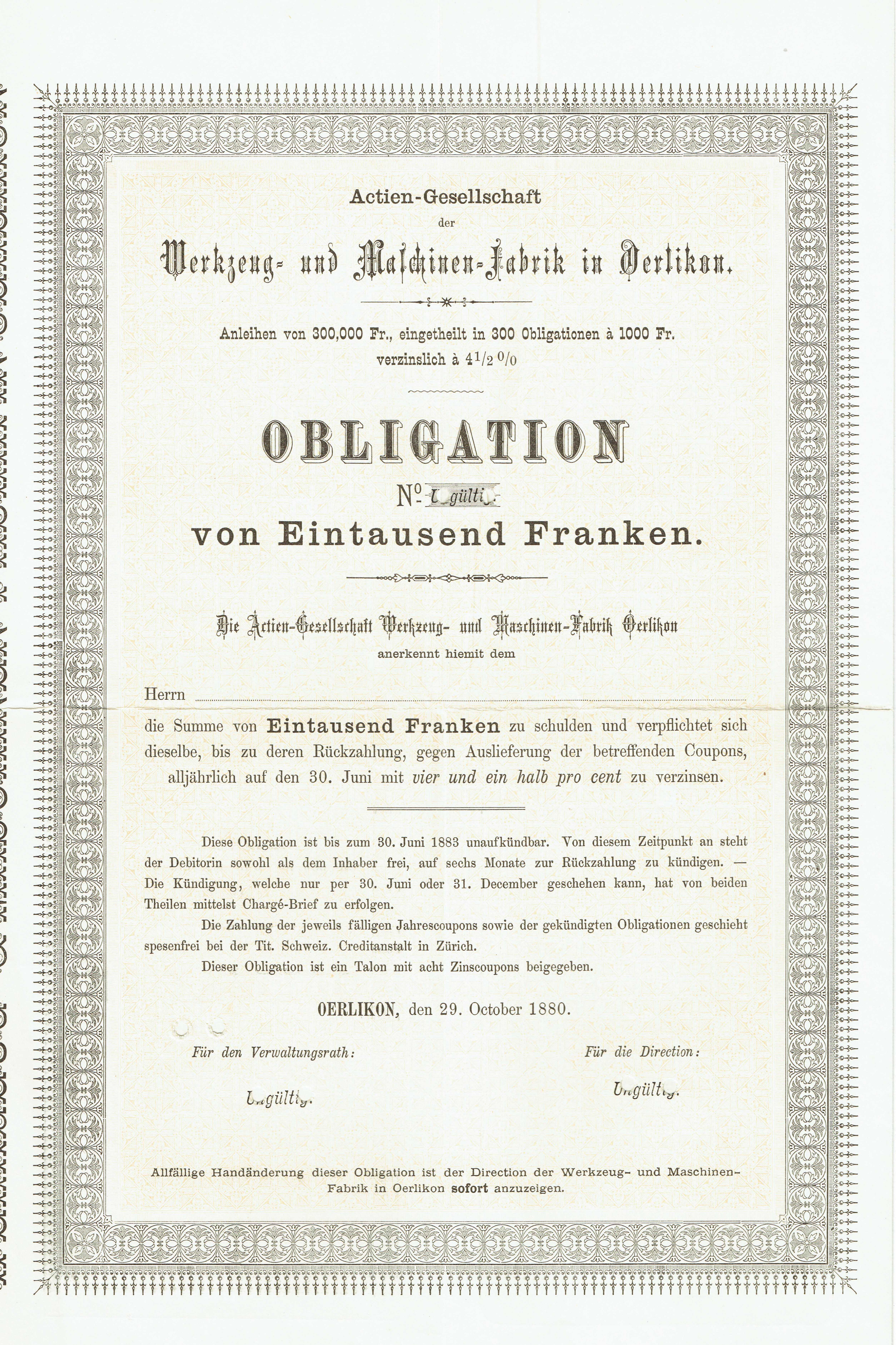
Bond of the Werkzeug- und Maschinen-Fabrik Oerlikon, issued 29. October 1880

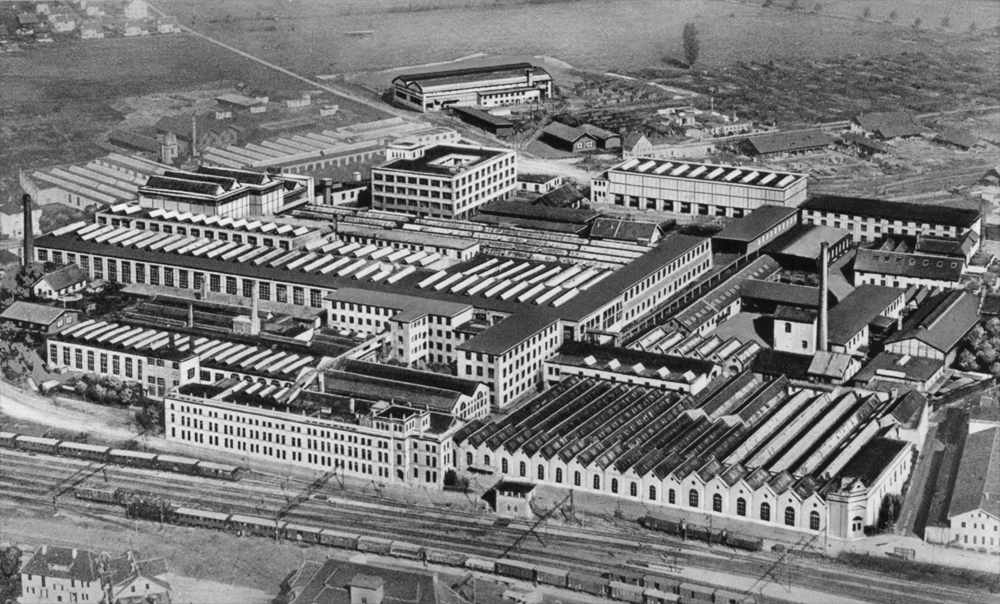
The Maschinenfabrik Oerlikon factory in Zürich (1930)

Maschinenfabrik Oerlikon was a Swiss engineering company based in the Zürich district of Oerlikon known for the early development of electric locomotives. It was founded in 1876 as the Werkzeug- und Maschinen-Fabrik Oerlikon by the industrialist Peter Emil Huber-Werdmüller, and occupied a large site immediately to the west of Oerlikon railway station.

In 1906, the armaments business was demerged to form Schweizerische Werkzeugmaschinenfabrik Oerlikon, which evolved into the technology company OC Oerlikon and the armaments company Rheinmetall Air Defence (formerly Oerlikon Contraves).

In 1967, Maschinenfabrik Oerlikon was taken over by Brown, Boveri & Cie, which merged with ASEA in 1988 to form ABB Group.

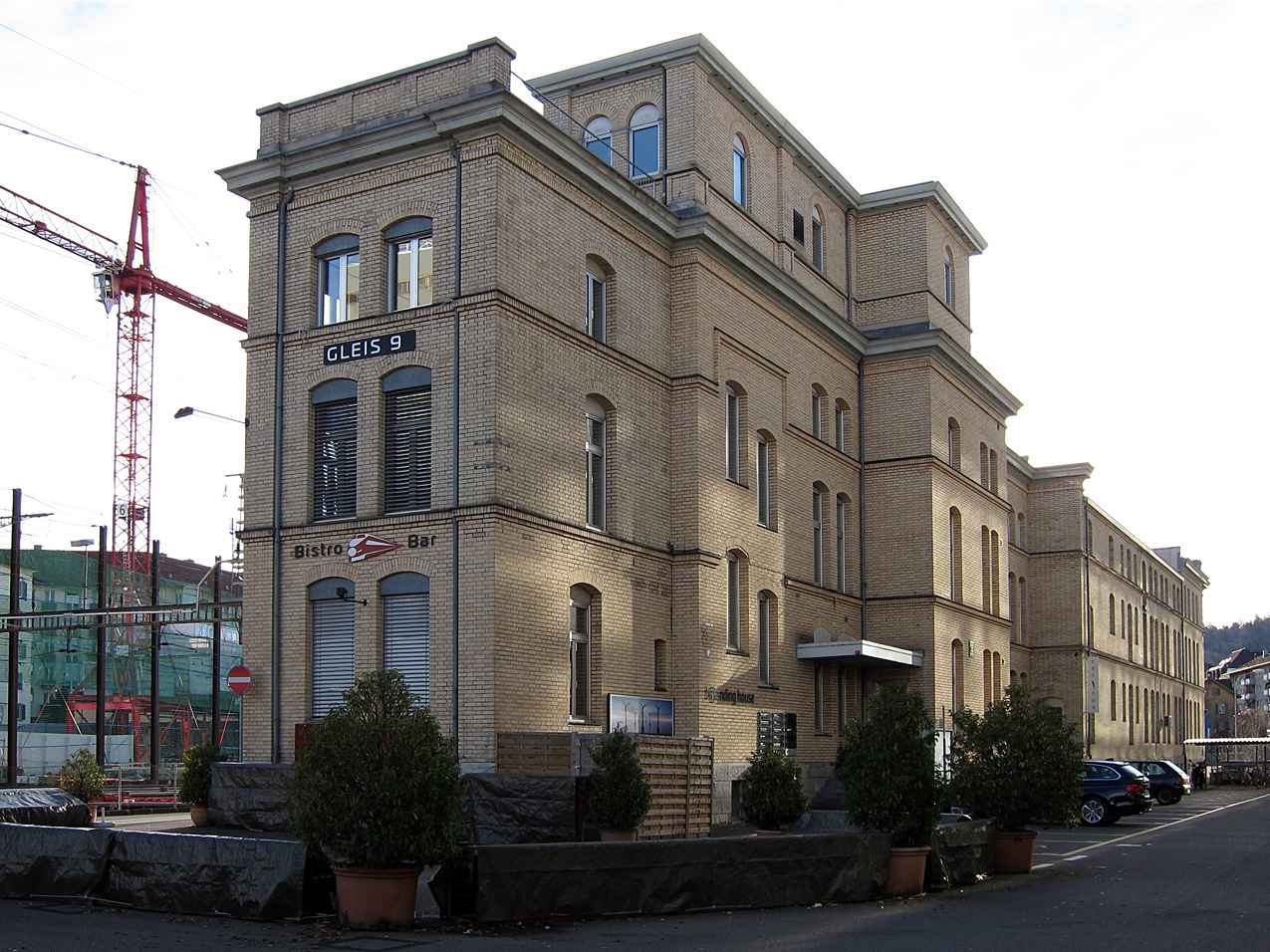
Gleis 9, the former offices of Maschinenfabrik Oerlikon

The site of the company's works has been redeveloped, including the innovative public MFO-Park. In the second decade of the 21st century, a project was initiated to expand Oerlikon railway station, with the provision of two additional platform tracks on north-western side of the station. That affected the site of the former office building of Maschinenfabrik Oerlikon, dating from the late 19th century, and now a restaurant complex known as Gleis 9. Because of its cultural importance to the region, plans to demolish the building were rejected, and instead, the 6,200-metric-ton (6,800-ton) building was moved 60 meters (200 ft) to the west, on specially laid tracks. The move took place in May 2012, and took 19 hours.
