= Friedrich Martin Schindler =

Swiss industrialist (1858–1927)

- Born: 7 February 1858; Zurich, Switzerland
- Died: 14 May 1927 (aged 69); Zurich, Switzerland
- Education: Federal Polytechnic, Zurich
- Occupations: Chemist; industrialist
- Employer: Aluminium Industrie AG Neuhausen
- Spouse: Sophie Escher (m. 1892)
- Father: Kaspar Schindler
- Relatives: Samuel Dietrich Schindler (brother)

Friedrich Martin Schindler (7 February 1858 – 14 May 1927) was a Swiss industrialist from Zurich. A chemist trained at the Federal Polytechnic in Zurich, he became administrative director of the newly founded Aluminium Industrie AG Neuhausen (later Alusuisse) in 1888 and was its general director from 1900 to 1920. Under him the aluminum works in Rheinfelden (Baden), Lend, Rauris and Chippis were built.

== Biography ==
Friedrich Martin Schindler was born in Zurich on 7 February 1858, the son of Kaspar Schindler and the brother of Samuel Dietrich Schindler. In 1892 he married Sophie Escher, daughter of Hans Konrad Escher, a doctor of law and cantonal councillor (Kantonsrat).

In 1878 Schindler graduated as a chemist from the Federal Polytechnic in Zurich (now ETH Zurich). He spent time in France, Italy and the United States and headed the paper and cellulose factory in Scheer in Württemberg.

In 1888 Schindler became administrative director of the newly founded Aluminium Industrie AG Neuhausen, later Alusuisse, and from 1900 to 1920 he was its general director. Under Schindler, aluminum works were built in Rheinfelden (Baden) in 1898, in Lend (Salzburg) in 1899, in Rauris (Salzburg) in 1903 and in Chippis from 1905 to 1910, along with hydroelectric power stations, alumina factories and bauxite mines in France, Germany and Hungary. In 1917 he received an honorary doctorate from ETH Zurich. He died in Zurich on 14 May 1927.

== Bibliography ==
- J. Winteler, Landammann Dietrich Schindler, seine Vorfahren und Nachkommen, 1932, 218–224
- Biographisches Lexikon verstorbener Schweizer, 2, 1948, 258 f.
