= Society of Trust and Estate Practitioners =

International professional body

Society of Trust and Estate Practitioners logo

STEP (the Society of Trust and Estate Practitioners) was founded by George Tasker in 1991 and is the international professional body for advisers who specialise in inheritance and succession planning. Its members are mainly solicitors, barristers, attorneys, accountants, tax advisers, trust officers and trust administrators as well as banking and insurance professionals in the trust field.

== Objectives ==
The main focus of the organisation is to promote high professional standards within the profession, to provide educational and networking opportunities for its members and to contribute to debate and public policy in its specialist field.

== Membership ==
STEP has more than 100 branches and chapters in 56 countries with a current membership in excess of 20,000. It runs a number of educational programmes, from entry-level certificates to a full diploma. Accumulated credits from these qualifications and prior experience determine the level of membership. Only full STEP members can use the letters TEP after their name. The designation TEP after a member's name is the only widely recognised mark for professionals in the trust and estate administration industry.

All STEP members are subject to a Code of Professional Conduct requiring them at all times to act with integrity and in a manner that inspires the confidence, respect and trust of their clients and of the wider community. Members are also required to keep up to date with the latest legal, technical and regulatory developments. STEP members who advise on tax matters are also required to abide by guidance in the Professional Conduct in Relation to Taxation, which includes an obligation on STEP members to not seek results contrary to the clear intention of Parliament.

== STEP Governance ==
STEP's governance as a whole is the responsibility of STEP's board of directors. The Board is supported in their role by STEP's Council, a consultative body who advise the Board on aspects of STEP's strategic journey, as well as on matters of interest to the wider membership. The Board is responsible for the high-level strategic direction of STEP. Board members are the Directors of STEP with the legal authority and responsibility for the organisation. Directors are appointed by Council from among the serving Council members under an election process. One Director serves as Chair of STEP and two serve as Deputy Chairs. There are currently Seven Directors in all, together with the chief executive officer.

The current chair of STEP, as of 1 January 2024, is Kelly Greig TEP, a UK solicitor. STEP Council)
