= Dietrich Schindler (jurist, born 1924) =

Swiss jurist (1924–2018)

- Born: 22 December 1924; Zurich, Switzerland
- Died: 7 February 2018 (aged 93)
- Occupations: Jurist; professor
- Spouse: Elfriede Helene Kuhn
- Father: Dietrich Schindler
- Relatives: Regine Schindler (sister-in-law)

Dietrich Schindler (22 December 1924 – 7 February 2018) was a Swiss jurist. From 1964 he was associate professor and from 1968 to 1989 full professor of international law and constitutional law at the University of Zurich, and he was a member of the International Committee of the Red Cross from 1961 to 1973 and from 1980 to 1994.

== Biography ==
Dietrich Schindler was born in Zurich on 22 December 1924, the son of the jurist Dietrich Schindler. He married Elfriede Helene Kuhn. He was the brother-in-law of Regine Schindler.

Schindler studied law at the University of Zurich, in Geneva and Paris, and at Harvard. He obtained his doctorate in 1950 and his habilitation in 1957. From 1956 to 1964 he was a Privatdozent at the University of Zurich. He was a lecturer (Lehrbeauftragter) at the University of Bonn in 1957–1958, a visiting professor at the University of Michigan in 1961–1962 and, from 1967 to 1979, a lecturer at the Hague Academy of International Law. At the University of Zurich he became associate professor (ausserordentlicher Professor) in 1964 and was full professor of international law and constitutional law from 1968 to 1989. His research covered Swiss federalism, Swiss neutrality and international law.

Schindler was a member of the International Committee of the Red Cross from 1961 to 1973 and from 1980 to 1994. In 1962 he was an adviser on constitutional questions in the Democratic Republic of the Congo. He became a member of the Institut de Droit International in 1967 and of the Permanent Court of Arbitration in The Hague in 1977. In Switzerland he was a member of the expert group reviewing federal subsidies in 1965–1966, president of the Swiss Political Science Association from 1965 to 1969 and a member of the advisory commission on relations between Switzerland and the United Nations from 1973 to 1975. In 1993 he received an honorary doctorate from the University of Basel. He died on 7 February 2018.

== Bibliography ==
- W. Haller et al. (eds.), Im Dienst an der Gemeinschaft, 1989 (with a list of works)
