= Dietrich Schindler (politician) =

Swiss politician (1795–1882)

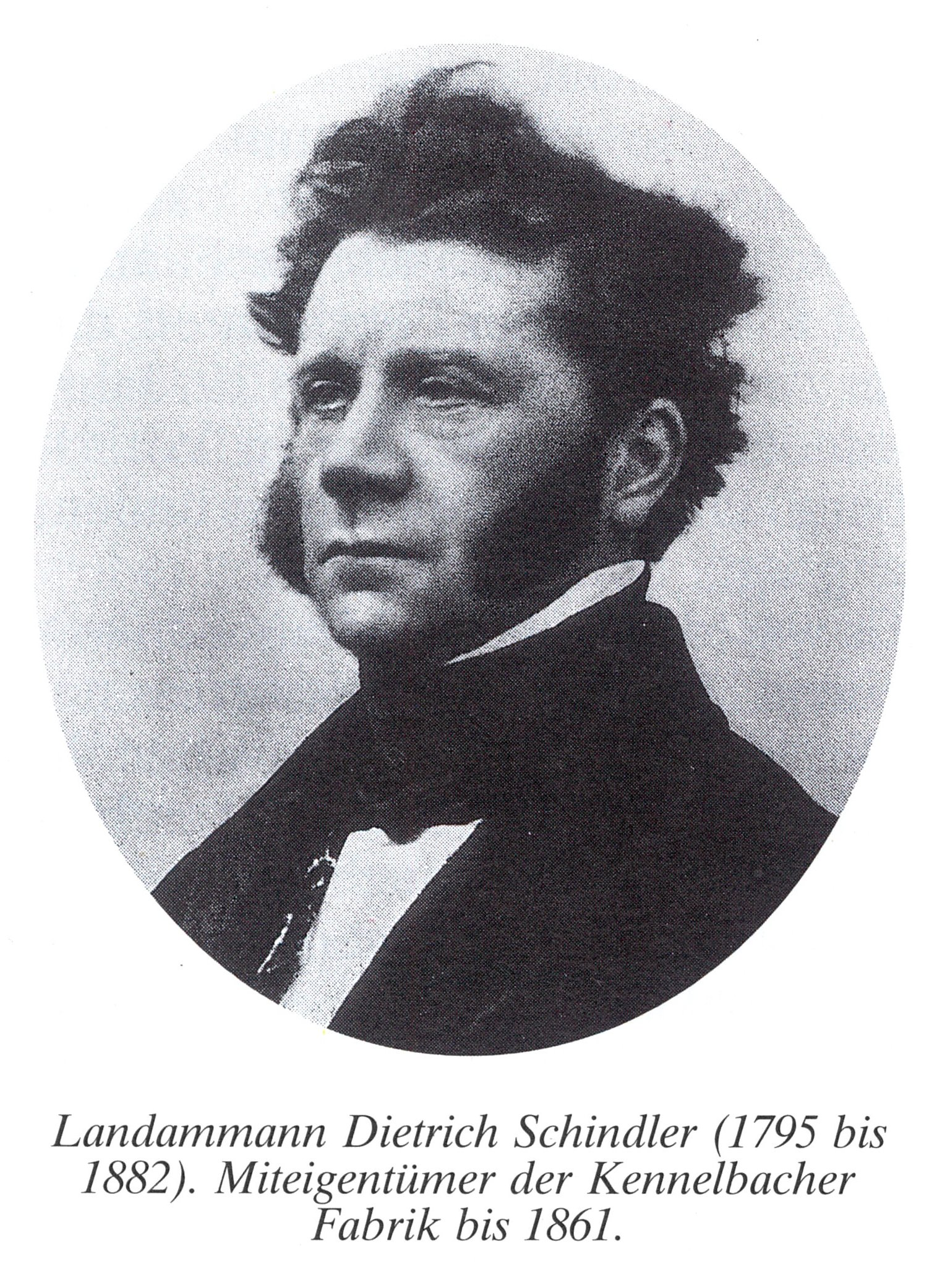
- Born: 28 November 1795; Mollis, Glarus, Old Swiss Confederacy
- Died: 2 April 1882 (aged 86); Wiesbaden, German Empire
- Occupation: Politician
- Spouse: Maria Georgia Schindler (m. 1826)
- Parents: Samuel Schindler (father); Barbara Schmid (mother)

Dietrich Schindler (28 November 1795 – 2 April 1882) was a Swiss politician from the canton of Glarus. As a member of the constitutional council of 1836 he played a major part in drafting the Glarus constitution, which abolished the confessional division of the canton, and in 1837 he was elected Landammann as leader of the Reform party. He helped liberalism achieve its breakthrough in Glarus, representing a moderate line that sought accommodation with the Catholic minority.

== Biography ==
Dietrich Schindler was born on 28 November 1795 in Mollis, now part of the municipality of Glarus Nord, the son of Samuel Schindler and Barbara Schmid. In 1826 he married Maria Georgia Schindler, daughter of Kaspar Schindler.

Schindler was educated at the Fellenberg institute in Hofwil. From 1816 to 1820 he studied law in Heidelberg, Bonn and Berlin, and he served a commercial apprenticeship in Trieste. He was a partner (Associé) in the firm Jenny & Schindler in Hard near Bregenz.

In 1821 Schindler became a member of the council (Ratsherr) of Glarus, in 1824 banner bearer (Pannervortrager), in 1826 master of the arsenal (Zeugherr) and in 1834 cantonal ensign (Landesfähnrich). After 1822 he was a member of the Protestant court of appeal, which he presided over from 1835, and in 1834 and 1838 he was an envoy to the Federal Diet (Tagsatzung). He promoted school reform: in 1827 he presided over the Protestant school council and from 1837 to 1841 over the joint (paritätisch) school council, and he wrote a guide for teachers. He also worked to develop the road network and, among other projects, initiated the Kerenzerberg road.

From 1831 Schindler championed liberal demands, and in 1832 he supported the revision of the Federal Treaty. As a member of the cantonal constitutional council of 1836, he played a major part in drafting the Glarus constitution, which abolished the confessional division of the canton; the implementing laws in particular were his work. Elected Landammann in 1837 as leader of the Reform party (Reformpartei), he was able to break the resistance of the Catholics only through the military occupation of Näfels. He came under increasing attack from the Radicals, who accused him of leniency toward the Catholic clergy. In 1840 he let himself be persuaded to take on the office of deputy Landammann (Statthalter). A year later he resigned from all his offices, and in 1842 he moved to Zurich.

Schindler helped liberalism achieve its breakthrough in the canton of Glarus. He represented a moderate tendency that sought accommodation with the Catholic minority. He died in Wiesbaden on 2 April 1882.

== Bibliography ==
- J. Winteler, Landammann Dietrich Schindler, seine Vorfahren und Nachkommen, 1932
- F. Stucki, "Landammann Dietrich Schindler", in F. Stucki and H. Thürer (eds.), Grosse Glarner, 1986, 129–140
- H. R. Stauffacher, "Umkehrung des 'Züriputsches' im Glarnerland", in Züriputsch, 1989, 143–153
- H. R. Stauffacher, "Der Glarner Landammann Dietrich Schindler 1795–1882", in Jahrbuch des Historischen Vereins des Kantons Glarus, 74, 1993, 11–39
