= Mollis =

- Former municipality
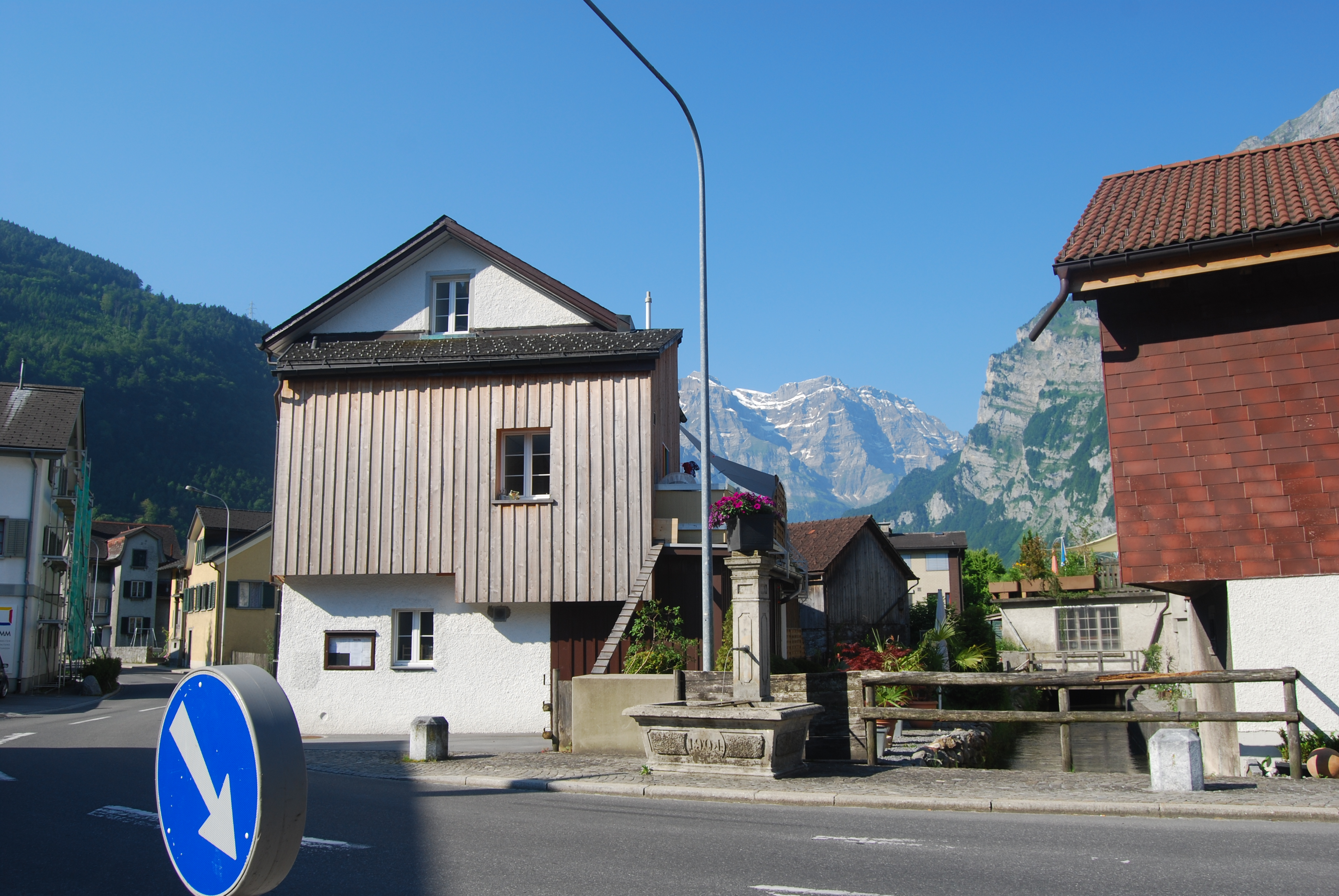

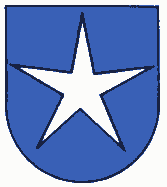
- Coat of arms
- Location of Mollis
- Location within Switzerland Location within Canton of Glarus
- Coordinates: 47°06′N 9°05′E
- Country: Switzerland
- Canton: Glarus
- District: n.a.

Area
  - Total: 21.83 km^{2} (8.43 sq mi)
- Elevation: 433 m (1,421 ft)

Population (December 2020)
  - Total: 3,337
  - Density: 152.9/km^{2} (395.9/sq mi)
- Time zone: UTC+01:00 (CET)
  - Summer (DST): UTC+02:00 (CEST)
- Postal code: 8753
- SFOS number: 1617
- ISO 3166 code: CH-GL
- Surrounded by: Ennenda, Filzbach, Näfels, Netstal, Niederurnen, Oberurnen, Weesen (SG)
- Website: www.mollis.ch

Mollis is a former municipality in the canton of Glarus in Switzerland. Effective from 1 January 2011, Mollis is part of the municipality of Glarus Nord.

== History ==
Mollis is first mentioned in 1288.

== Geography ==
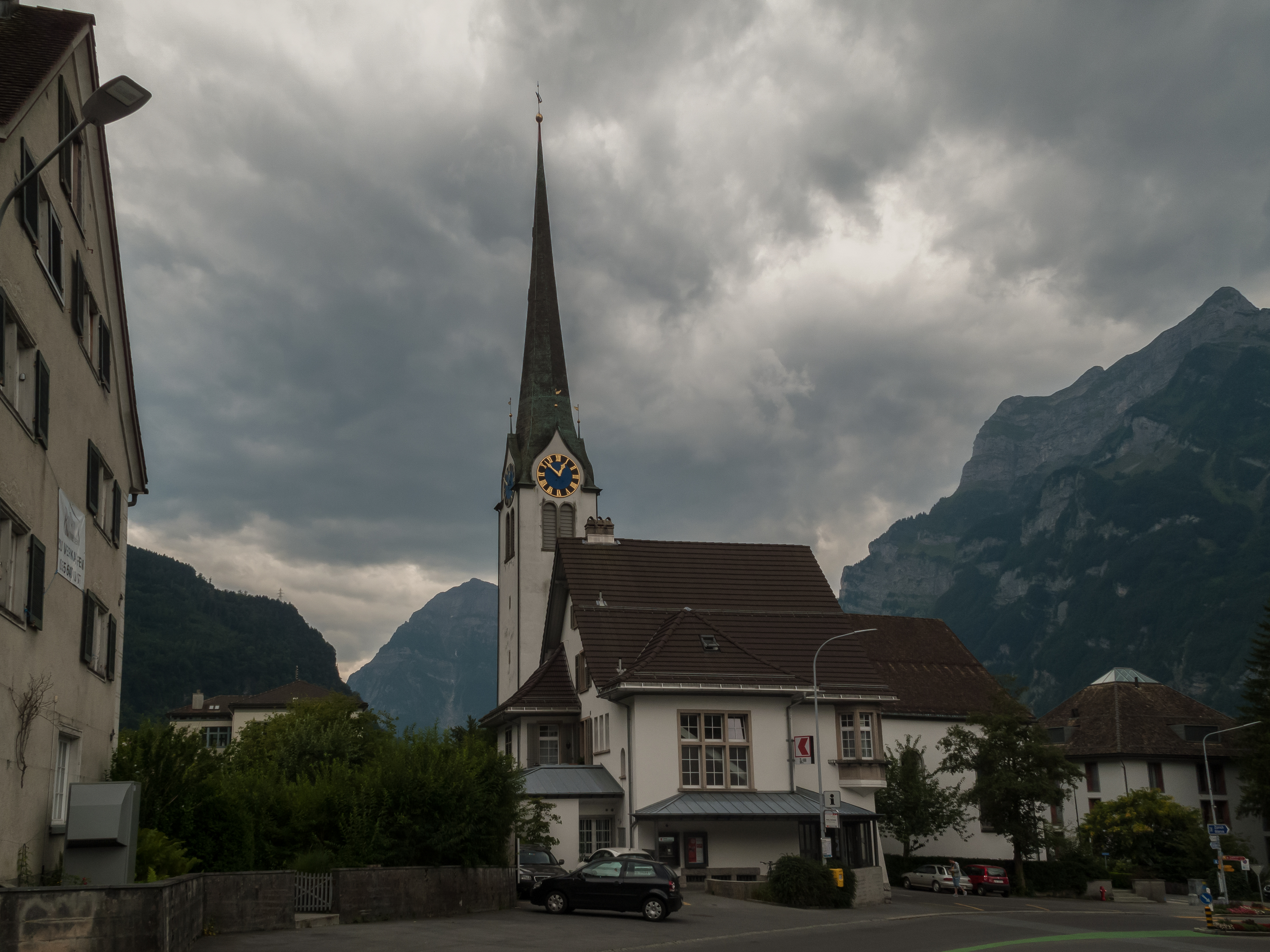
Reformed church

Mollis has an area, as of 2006, of 21.8 km^{2} (8.4 sq mi). Of this area, 41% is used for agricultural purposes, while 44.9% is forested. Of the rest of the land, 8.2% is settled (buildings or roads) and the remainder (5.9%) is non-productive (rivers, glaciers or mountains).

The municipality is located on the right side of the Linth valley. It includes the area from the Linth Canal and Walensee to the Schlattbach in the Netstal. It consists of the village of Mollis and the hamlets of Beglingen on the Kerenzerberg and the alpine settlement of Mullern.

Aerial view from 100 m by Walter Mittelholzer (1919)

== Demographics ==
Mollis had a population (as of 2010) of 3,337. As of 2007, 12.1% of the population was made up of foreign nationals. Over the last 10 years the population has grown at a rate of 4.6%. Most of the population (as of 2000) speaks German (90.8%), with Italian being second most common (2.8%) and Albanian being third (1.9%).

In the 2007 federal election the most popular party was the SPS which received 54.1% of the vote. Most of the rest of the votes went to the SVP with 34.1% of the vote.

In Mollis about 73.4% of the population (between age 25-64) have completed either non-mandatory upper secondary education or additional higher education (either University or a Fachhochschule).

Mollis has an unemployment rate of 1.0%. As of 2005, there were 154 people employed in the primary economic sector and about 43 businesses involved in this sector. 384 people are employed in the secondary sector and there are 47 businesses in this sector. 500 people are employed in the tertiary sector, with 94 businesses in this sector.

The historical population is given in the following table:

year	population
1554	440
1701	1,150
1799	1,654
1850	2,041
1900	1,912
1950	2,191
1970	2,628
2000	2,974

== Transport ==
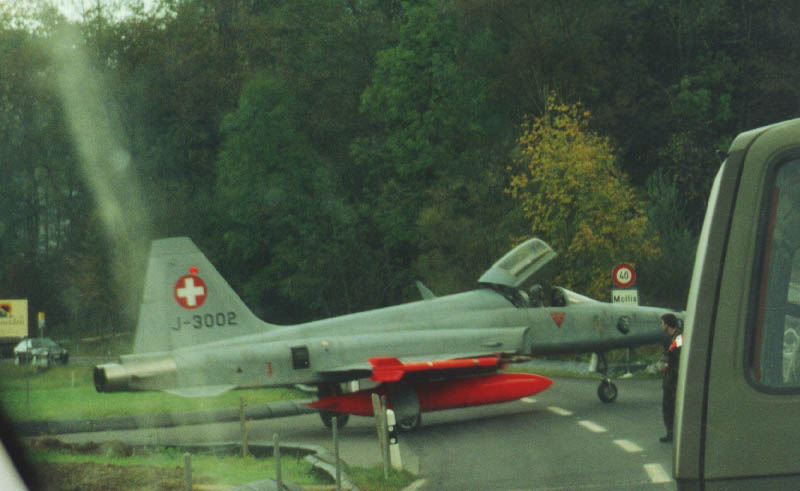
A F-5E X-ing Street at Mollis

Näfels-Mollis railway station is on the Ziegelbrücke-Linthal railway line. It is served by the Zürich S-Bahn service S25 between Linthal and Zürich, and by the St. Gallen S-Bahn service S6 between Rapperswil and Schwanden. As of the December 2023 timetable change, both services operate once per hour, combining to provide two trains per hour between Ziegelbrücke and Schwanden. Weesen railway station on the Ziegelbrücke–Sargans railway line is also located within the former municipality of Mollis, although it served the town of Weesen in the canton of St. Gallen. This station is disused since the 2013 timetable change.

The former military airfield at Mollis was used first by the Swiss Air Force with jetfighters like de Havilland Vampire, Hawker Hunter and F-5E and F-5F until 1999 from Squadron 20. After 1999 it was the home base for a helicopter air transport squadron with Super Puma, but a few years later Mollis was inactive as so called "Sleeping Base" for helicopters for a few more years. The aircraft were stored in a hardened aircraft shelter, the command unit were working in a cavern inside the mountain. However it is today no longer a military facility and will only be used for civilian purposes. Heli Linth and the Rega (air rescue) (REGA base 12) use the airfield daily. In April 1923 was the first "Flugtag") (Air Show) when Walter Mittelholzer made the first landing at Mollis and took passenger flights.

== Notable residents ==
The 16th-century music theorist and humanist Heinrich Glarean was born there, where his father served for forty years on the town council. The Bulgarian-born astronomer Fritz Zwicky is buried there.
