= Niklaus Franz von Bachmann =

Swiss military officer (1740–1831)

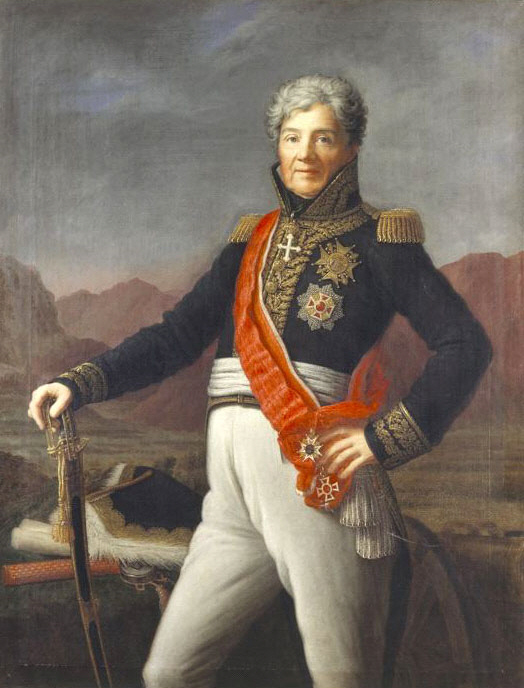
- Portrait by Felix Maria Diogg, 1817
- Born: 27 March 1740; Näfels, Switzerland
- Died: 11 February 1831 (aged 90); Näfels, Switzerland
- Military career
- Allegiance: Kingdom of France; Kingdom of Sardinia; Swiss Confederation
- Branch: Army
- Service years: 1756–1802, 1815
- Rank: (Kingdom of France) Colonel (Kingdom of Sardinia) Lieutenant General (Switzerland) General (Commander-in-Chief)
- Commands: Swiss Army
- Conflicts: French Revolutionary Wars; War of the First Coalition; War of the Second Coalition; Stecklikrieg; Napoleonic Wars; Hundred Days
- Awards: Grand Cross of the Order of Saint Louis; Grand Cross of the Order of Leopold; Grand Cross of the Order of Saints Maurice and Lazarus

Niklaus Leodegar Franz Ignaz von Bachmann (27 March 1740 – 11 February 1831) was a Swiss military officer who served as commander-in-chief (General) of the Swiss Army at the end of the Napoleonic Wars.

== Family and early life ==
Bachmann was born on 27 March 1740 in Näfels, Switzerland, into a family of Swiss mercenaries. He was the son of Karl Leonhard von Bachmann, a maréchal de camp in the French Army, and Elisabeth Keller. Among his ancestors were Kaspar von Gallati (1535–1619) and Kaspar Freuler (1595–1651), first and fourth colonels of the Regiment of Swiss Guards of the King of France. His sister Maria Dorothea married Freiherr Franz Josef Muller von Friedberg, Prime Minister of the Prince-abbot of St. Gall, and was the mother of the politician Karl von Müller-Friedberg, founder and first Landamman of the Canton of St. Gallen.

== Military career ==
=== France ===
After attending the Jesuits' College in Feldkirch and the Collegio Nazareno in Rome, Bachmann entered French service in 1756. He was appointed ensign in a company commanded by his older brother, Karl Josef von Bachmann, in 1758. Bachmann was promoted to captain in the Widmer Regiment in 1759, to major in the Boccard Regiment in 1768, and to lieutenant-colonel in 1773. He was made a Knight of the Order of Saint Louis in 1778. Promoted to colonel in 1779, Bachmann was entrusted with the training of infantry troops from Brittany destined for service in the American War of Independence.

In 1789, Bachmann was appointed to France's Supreme War Council. He was involved in the reorganization of the French Army and played a key role in drafting the War Regulations of 1791, early in the French Revolution. Bachmann's brother, Karl Josef, was sentenced to death for his part in the defense of King Louis XVI in the Insurrection of 10 August 1792, and was guillotined in September of the same year. That same month, the revolutionary government dissolved the Swiss Guards and other Swiss mercenary units, bring an end to the capitulations between the French monarchy and the Swiss Confederation.

=== Sardinia and Austria ===
Bachmann became a sworn enemy of the Revolution upon the fall of the monarchy in August 1792. In 1793, he entered the service of Kingdom of Sardinia, which was at war with France as part of the First Coalition. Initially in command of a regiment, Bachmann was promoted to lieutenant general in 1794. After Sardinia's defeat in the Italian campaign of 1796–1797, Bachmann returned to Switzerland as a prisoner of war and was placed under house arrest by the government of the Helvetic Republic. However, as soon as the Second Coalition arose against revolutionary France, he entered Austro-British service and commanded Swiss émigrés fighting for the Coalition. In early 1800, Bachmann re-introduced to his troops the old Swiss symbol of the white cross on a red field, which had not been used anymore since the Middle Ages.

=== Stecklikrieg ===
In 1802, the Swiss Federal Diet in Schwyz appointed Bachmann commander-in-chief of the federal army, which opposed the army of the Helvetic Republic. In the brief Stecklikrieg he defeated the Helvetic army and was about to overthrow the Helvetic Republic when Napoleon Bonaparte intervened. General Jean Rapp, sent by Napoleon to pacify Switzerland, was angrily told by General Bachmann that had he arrived only 24 hours later he would have found Switzerland fully pacified. Without any sympathy for the new governments of either Switzerland or France, Bachmann went into retirement at the age of 63.

=== War of the Seventh Coalition ===
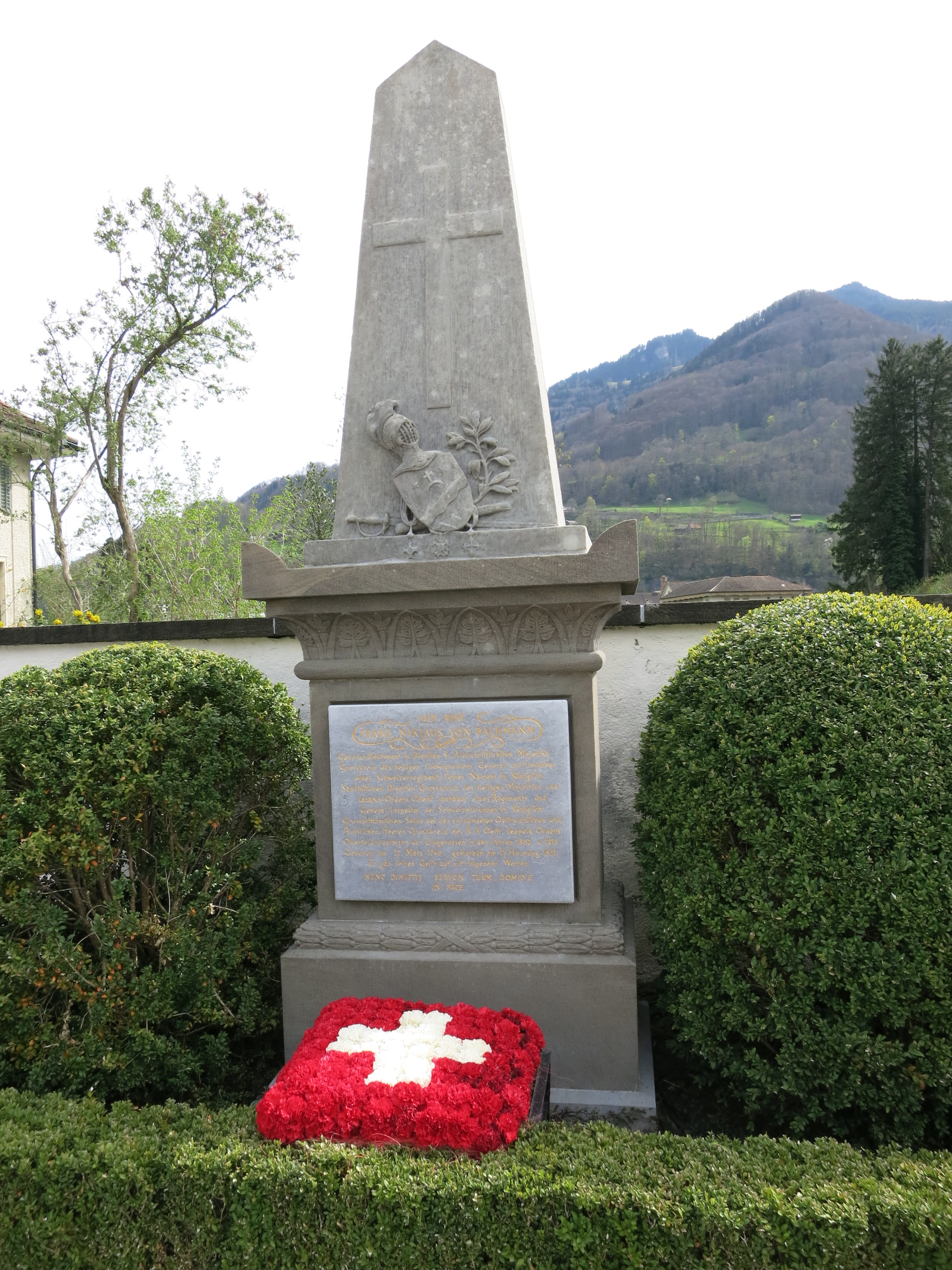
Monument to Bachmann in Näfels, Canton of Glarus, Switzerland

In 1815, after Napoleon's return to power and the outbreak of the War of the Seventh Coalition, Bachmann was called back into service and appointed him commander-in-chief of the Swiss Army by the Federal Diet. His task was to guard the Franco-Swiss border. By placing the army in a central, standby position between Lake Neuchâtel, Solothurn and Aarberg, Bachmann became the first Swiss military commander to deviate from the cordon-like border structure, and was thus a precursor of what would later become the National Redoubt. On 3 July 1815, 20,000 Swiss soldiers under his command invaded Franche-Comté and occupied Jougne, Pontarlier, Joux and Saint-Hippolyte on the French side of the border. Bachmann's campaign in Franche-Comté remains the most recent occasion when the Swiss Army entered foreign territory.

Bachmann was eventually compelled to end his offensive due to mutinies, lack of supplies and disunity within the Federal Diet. Frustrated, he resigned his command on 26 July. In a report justifying his decision presented to the Diet, Bachmann highlighted the political obstacles and serious deficiencies of the Swiss military. His ideas for improving Swiitzerland's military capabilities were implemented in the Federal Treaty of 1815 and the Military Regulations of 1817.

== Later life ==
After the war, Bachmann received the Grand Cross of the Order of Saint Louis (France), of the Order of Leopold (Austria) and of the Order of Saints Maurice and Lazarus (Sardinia). The Federal Diet, which did not have any orders, gave him a ceremonial sabre with a golden hilt. Louis XVIII offered Bachmann the position of inspector general of all the Swiss regiments in France, but he declined the offer due to his age. In 1819 he attended, as a guest of honour, the inauguration in Lucerne of the Lion Monument by Bertel Thorvaldsen, where his brother's name is engraved. Bachmann died in his native Näfels on 11 February 1831, at the age of almost 91 years.
