= Louis-Auguste-Augustin d'Affry =

Swiss military officer and diplomat

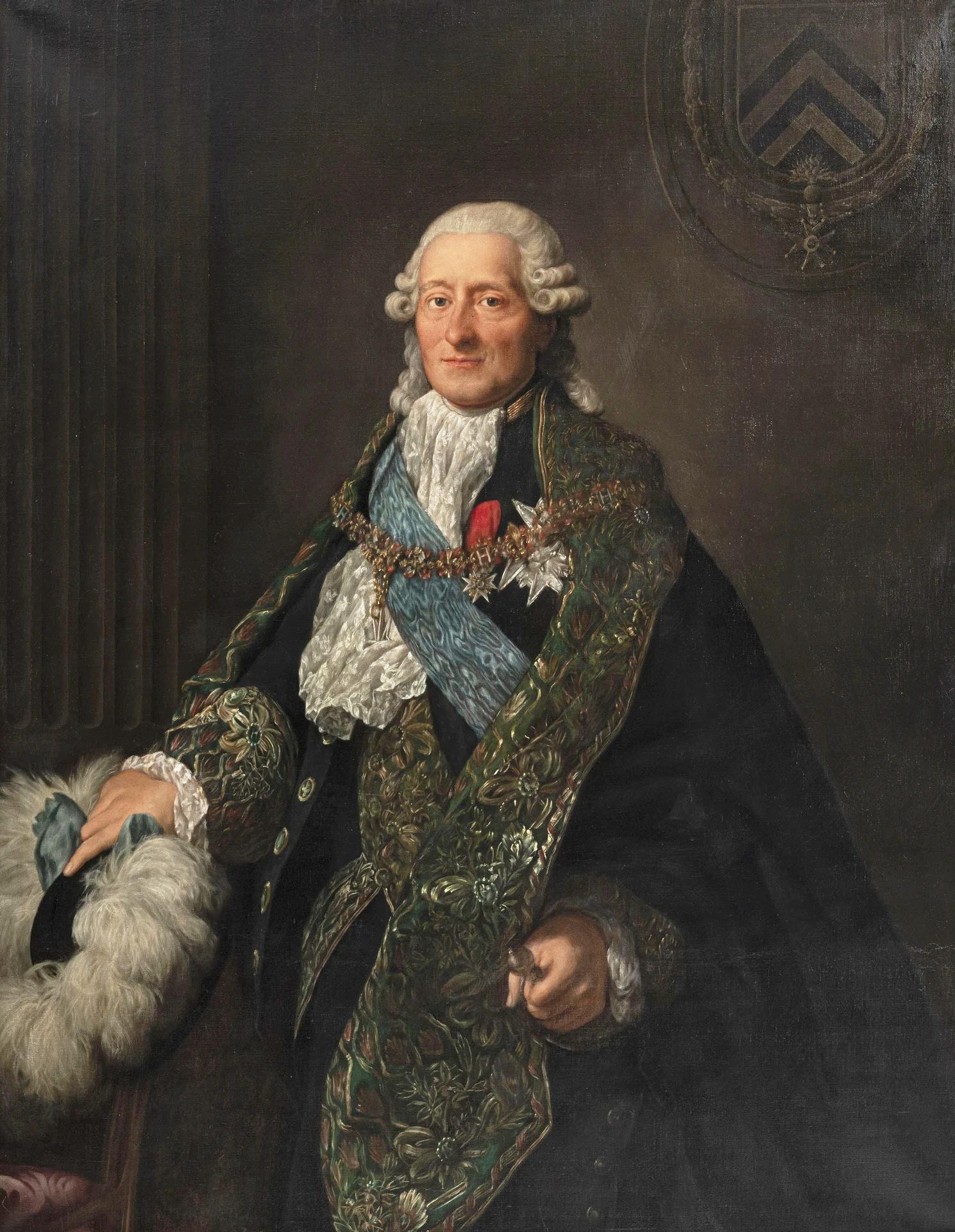
Portrait of d'Affry wearing the ceremonial robes of the Order of the Holy Spirit, after Alexander Roslin. He belonged to the influential circle of Swiss people at the French royal court around Pierre Victor, Baron de Besenval, who met regularly at the baron's residence, the Hôtel de Besenval.

Louis-Auguste-Augustin d'Affry (Versailles, 28 February 1713 – Saint-Barthélemy, 10 June 1793) was a Swiss military officer and diplomat under the French kings Louis XV and Louis XVI.

== Biography ==
Louis-Auguste-Augustin d'Affry was born in Versailles, France to Major François d'Affry (1667-1734) and Marie-Madeleine de Diesbach Steinbrugg, both from Fribourg, Switzerland. His paternal ancestors had served as mercenaries in French service nearly uninterruptedly since 1538. d'Affry joined the Swiss Guards as a cadet in 1725, and in 1734 fought at the Battle of Guastalla where his father was killed.

He was promoted to brigadier in 1744, to maréchal de camp in 1748, and to lieutenant-general in 1758. In 1767, d'Affry was made colonel of the Swiss Guards. He served as Louis XV's representative to the Dutch Republic from 1755 to 1762, and was the unofficial ambassador of the Old Swiss Confederacy to the French court. From 1771 until 1792, d'Affry was in charge of all Swiss troops in French service.

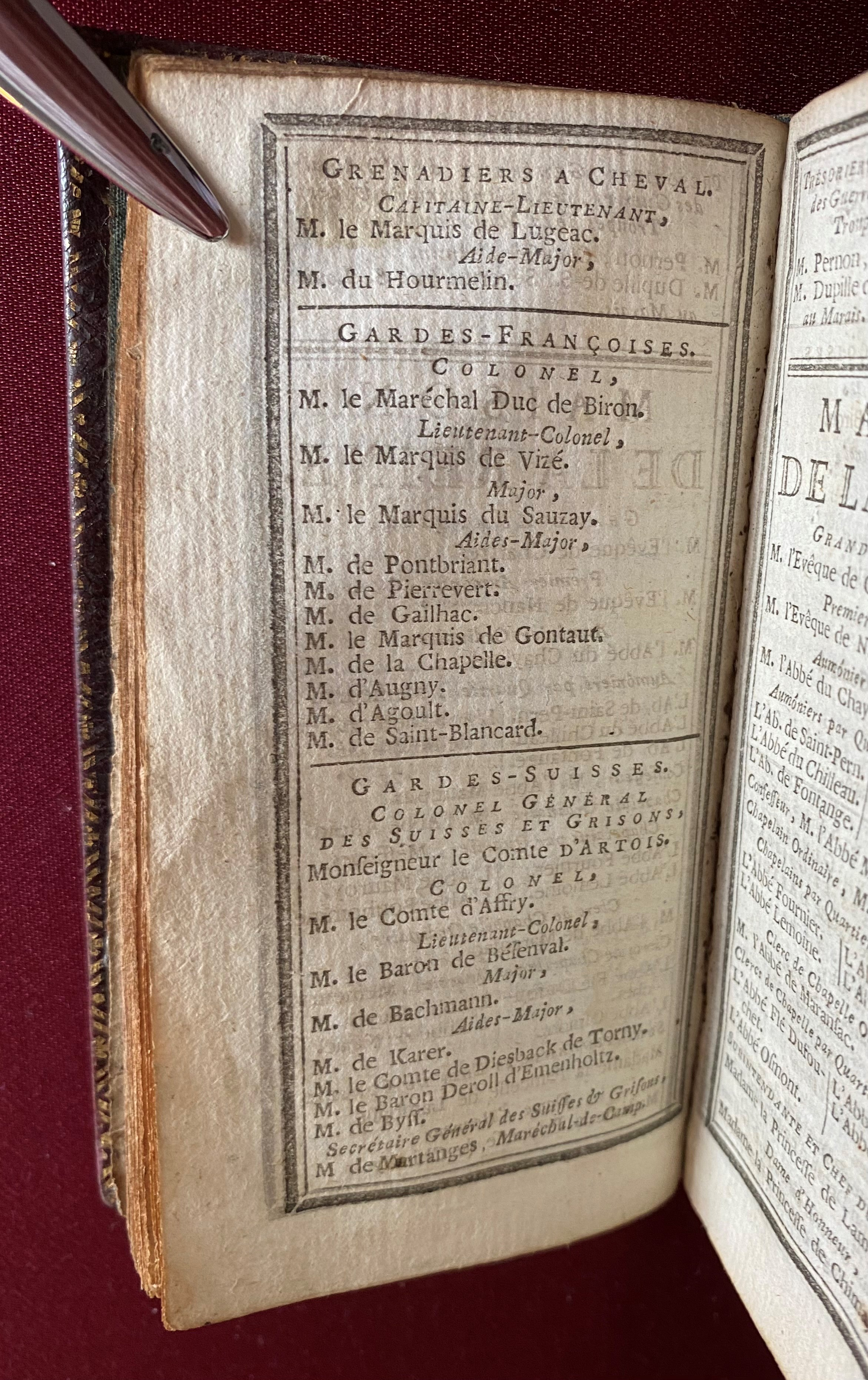
Louis-Auguste Augustin d'Affry's mention in the Calendrier de la cour in 1776 as Colonel of the Swiss Guards. During the fateful days of July 1789, he was sidelined by illness and Pierre Victor de Besenval acted as his deputy.

At the start of the French Revolution, d'Affry's failing health prevented him from involvement when the Swiss Guard was employed during the disturbances preceding the Storming of the Bastille on 14 July 1789. After Louis XVI's flight to Varennes in June 1791, he was appointed military governor of Paris and took an oath of allegiance to the National Constituent Assembly. Refusing to compromise his troops in counter-revolutionary activity, d'Affry endeavored to maintain the Swiss military presence in France while keeping it neutral in political affairs.

Due to age and weak health, d'Affry was again unable to command the Swiss Guards defending the Tuileries Palace during the Insurrection of 10 August 1792, although he signed the order summoning the regiment from its barracks the previous night. Command of the regiment was delegated to Major Karl Josef von Bachmann, who was subsequently to be guillotined. Although escaping responsibility for direct involvement in the abortive attempt to preserve the monarchy, d'Affry was imprisoned from 10 August until 2 September. After his release, he briefly resumed his former duties in order to handle the dismissal of the remaining Swiss mercenary regiments, (Note: The Swiss Guards were massacred at the Tuileries but eleven regiments of Swiss line infantry were still in existence.) following their dissolution by the new French Republican government. Although cheered in the streets, d'Affry appears to have been conscious of the changeability of public sentiment at the time. He accordingly left Paris on 20 October 1792 and died at his château in Saint-Barthélemy, Switzerland on 10 June 1793.

Louis-Auguste-Augustin d'Affry was married to Marie-Elisabeth d'Alt, the daughter of a Swiss colonel in Sardinian service. Their son was the Swiss politician Louis d'Affry, the first Landammann of Switzerland after the Act of Mediation. A freemason, d'Affry was a member of the Parisian lodge Société Olympique after 1786. He was also an honorary member of the royal academies of painting, sculpture and architecture.

== Honors ==
- Grand Cross of the Order of Saint Louis (1779).
- Knight of the Order of the Holy Spirit (1784). Louis-Auguste-Augustin d'Affry is the only Swiss in history to have received this title.

== Bibliography ==
- Andrey, Georges (2003). Louis d'Affry, 1743-1810, premier Landamman de la Suisse : la Confédération suisse à l'heure napoléonienne. Genève (Suisse): Slatkine. ISBN 9782832101155.
