= Näfels =

- Former municipality
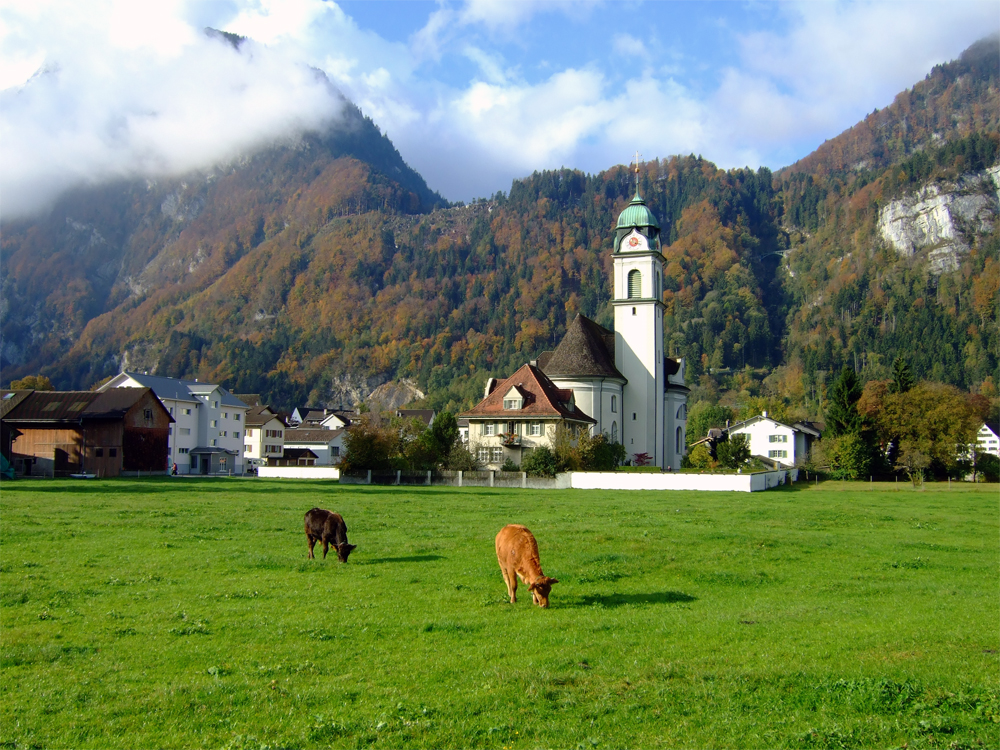

- Coat of arms
- Location of Näfels
- Location within Switzerland Location within Canton of Glarus
- Coordinates: 47°06′N 9°04′E
- Country: Switzerland
- Canton: Glarus
- District: n.a.

Area
  - Total: 36.93 km^{2} (14.26 sq mi)
- Elevation: 437 m (1,434 ft)
- Highest elevation (Rautispitz): 2,283 m (7,490 ft)

Population (December 2020)
  - Total: 4,021
  - Density: 108.9/km^{2} (282.0/sq mi)
- Time zone: UTC+01:00 (CET)
  - Summer (DST): UTC+02:00 (CEST)
- Postal code: 8752
- SFOS number: 1619
- ISO 3166 code: CH-GL
- Surrounded by: Glarus, Innerthal (SZ), Mollis, Netstal, Oberurnen
- Twin towns: Bad Säckingen (Germany)
- Website: www.naefels.ch

Näfels is a former municipality in the canton of Glarus in Switzerland. Effective from 1 January 2011, Näfels is part of the municipality of Glarus Nord.

== History ==
Näfels is first mentioned in 1240 as Nevels.

In 1388, the Swiss Confederates beat the Habsburgs at the Battle of Näfels, a victory that proved to be decisive in the series of Swiss-Austrian conflicts that stretched through most of the 14th Century as, in 1389, a peace treaty was signed at Vienna. The losses were much higher on the Austrian side, with 2,500 Austrians killed and 54 Swiss. The town's Slachtkapelle was created as a memorial to the men who fell in battle, and the Näfelser Fahrt, a pilgrimage to the site of the battle, has been held in April every year since the battle.

French Revolutionary Wars; the Helvetians and French stopped the Russo-Austrian advance during the combat at Näfels, part of the Battle of Glarus (1799).

== Geography ==
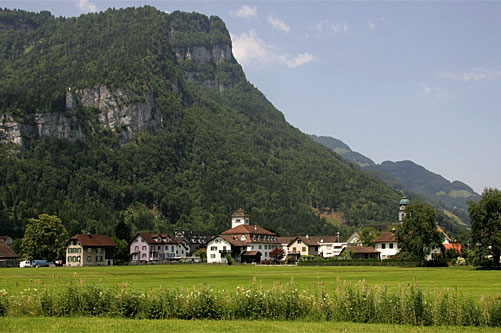
Näfels

Aerial view from 300 m by Walter Mittelholzer (1923)

Näfels has an area, as of 2006, of 36.9 km^{2} (14.2 sq mi). Of this area, 35.9% is used for agricultural purposes, while 37.6% is forested. Of the rest of the land, 4.4% is settled (buildings or roads) and the remainder (22.1%) is non-productive (rivers, glaciers or mountains).

Näfels is located in the Glarner Unterland on the left side of the valley, across from Mollis. It consists of the village of Näfels and the scattered settlements that make up the Näfelser Berg and the Oberseetal.

== Demographics ==
Näfels had a population (as of 2010) of 4,021. As of 2007, 19.3% of the population was made up of foreign nationals. Over the last 10 years the population has decreased at a rate of −0.6%. Most of the population (as of 2000) speaks German (86.9%), with Italian being second most common (5.2%) and Albanian being third (2.9%).

In the 2007 federal election the most popular party was the SPS which received 48.6% of the vote. Most of the rest of the votes went to the SVP with 40.2% of the vote.

In Näfels about 64% of the population (between age 25 and 64) have completed either non-mandatory upper secondary education or additional higher education (either university or a Fachhochschule).

Näfels has an unemployment rate of 1.59%. As of 2005, there were 94 people employed in the primary economic sector and about 39 businesses involved in this sector, while 1,399 people are employed in the secondary sector and there are 62 businesses in this sector. There are 918 people employed in the tertiary sector, with 140 businesses in this sector.

The historical population is given in the following table:

year	population
1777	533
1850	1,869
1870	2,513
1900	2,557
1950	3,327
2000	3,947

== Transport ==
Näfels-Mollis railway station is on the Weesen to Linthal railway line. It is served by the Zürich S-Bahn service S25 between Linthal and Zürich, and by the St. Gallen S-Bahn service S6 between Rapperswil and Schwanden. As of the December 2023 timetable change, both services operate once per hour, combining to provide two trains per hour between Ziegelbrücke and Schwanden.

== Notable residents ==
- Niklaus Franz von Bachmann (1740–1831), Swiss general in the Napoleonic Wars
- Karl Josef von Bachmann (1734–1792), Commander Swiss Guard for King Louis XVI of France, executed during the French Revolution
- Friedrich Schröder (1910–1972), German composer, born in Näfels

== Gallery ==
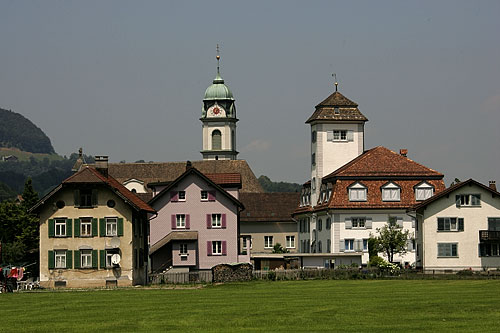
Church

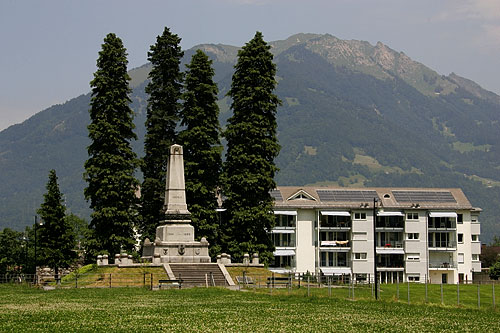
Battle memorial

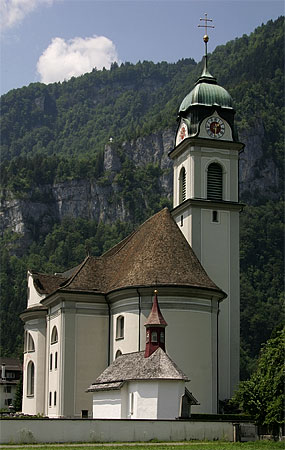
St. Hilarius Parish Church

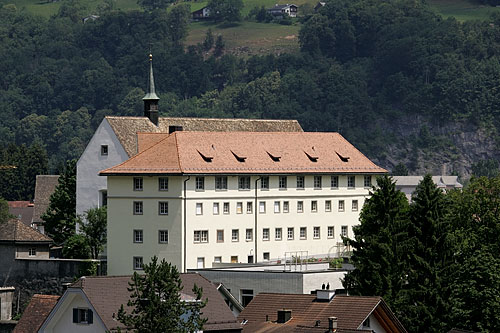
Franciscan abbey
