= Fontaine de la Régénération =

Monument in Paris, France

Coordinates: 48.8531°N 2.3691°E

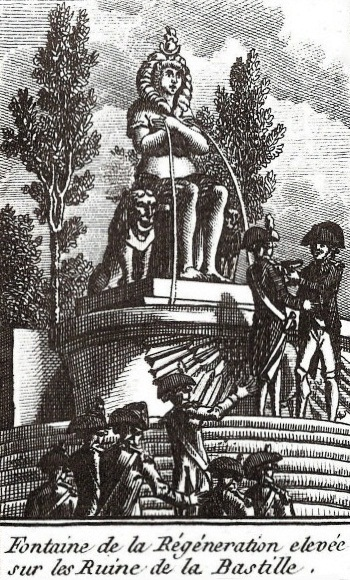

The fontaine de la Régénération or fontaine d'Isis is a monument erected in 1793 at the former site of the Bastille in Paris, during a festival to commemorate the anniversary of 10 August, 1792.

It featured a statue of goddess Isis flanked by two lions, with water springing from her breasts.
