= Karl Josef von Bachmann =

Swiss military officer (1734–1792)

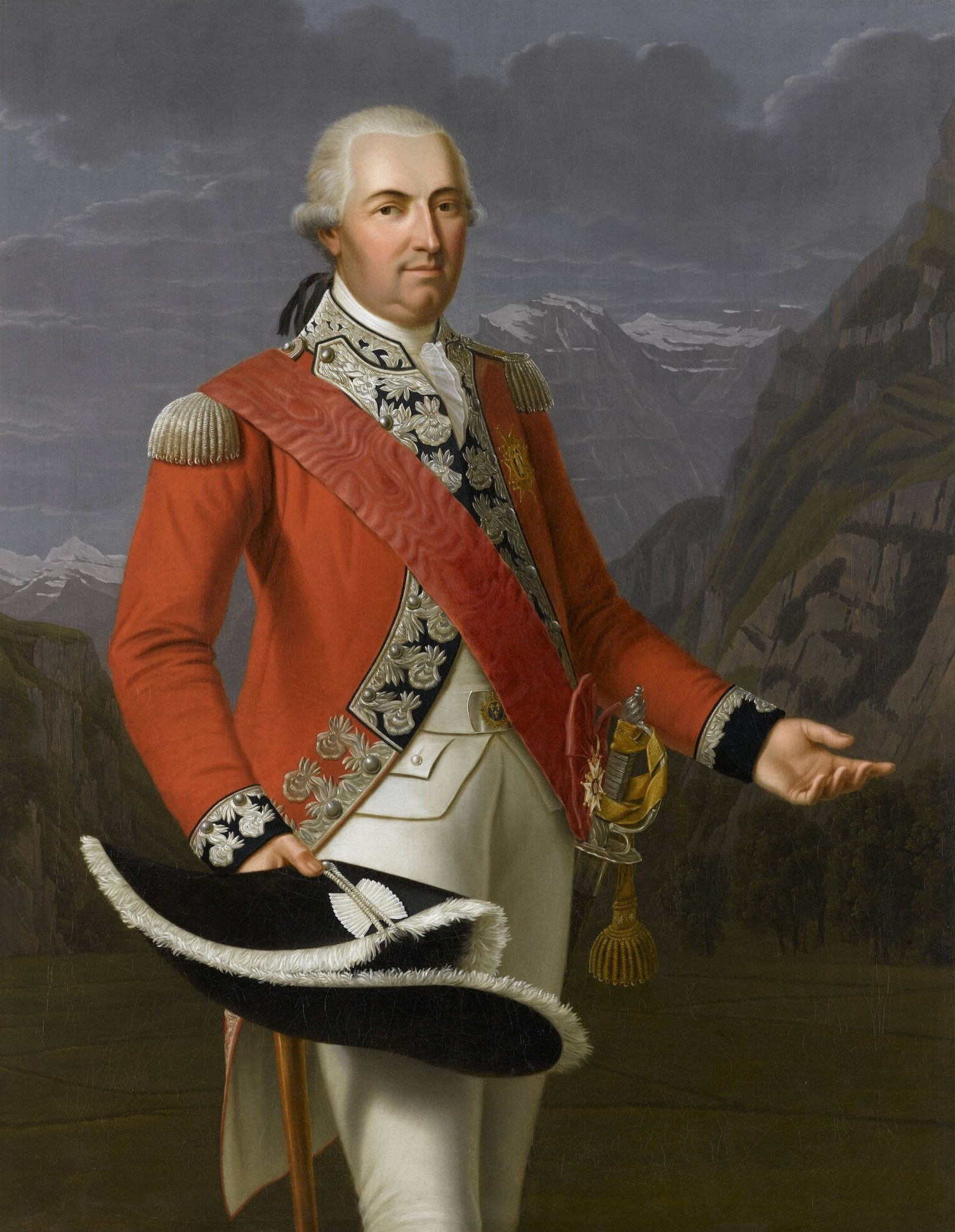
- Anonymous portrait, c. 1780s
- Born: 3 December 1734; Näfels, Switzerland
- Died: 3 September 1792 (aged 57); Paris, France
- Relatives: Niklaus Franz von Bachmann (brother)
- Military career
- Allegiance: Kingdom of France
- Branch: Army
- Service years: 1749–1792
- Rank: Maréchal de camp
- Unit: Swiss Guards
- Conflicts: Seven Years' War; Insurrection of 10 August 1792

Karl Josef Anton Leodegar von Bachmann (3 December 1734 – 3 September 1792) was a Swiss mercenary in French service, best known as the commander of the Swiss Guards during the Insurrection of 10 August 1792.

== Family ==
Bachmann was born on 3 December 1734 in Näfels, Switzerland, to Karl Leonhard von Bachmann and Elisabeth Keller. His father was a mercenary in French service who fought in the Spanish War of Succession and the Austrian War of Succession, rising to the rank of maréchal de camp. He was the brother of Niklaus Franz von Bachmann.

== Military career ==
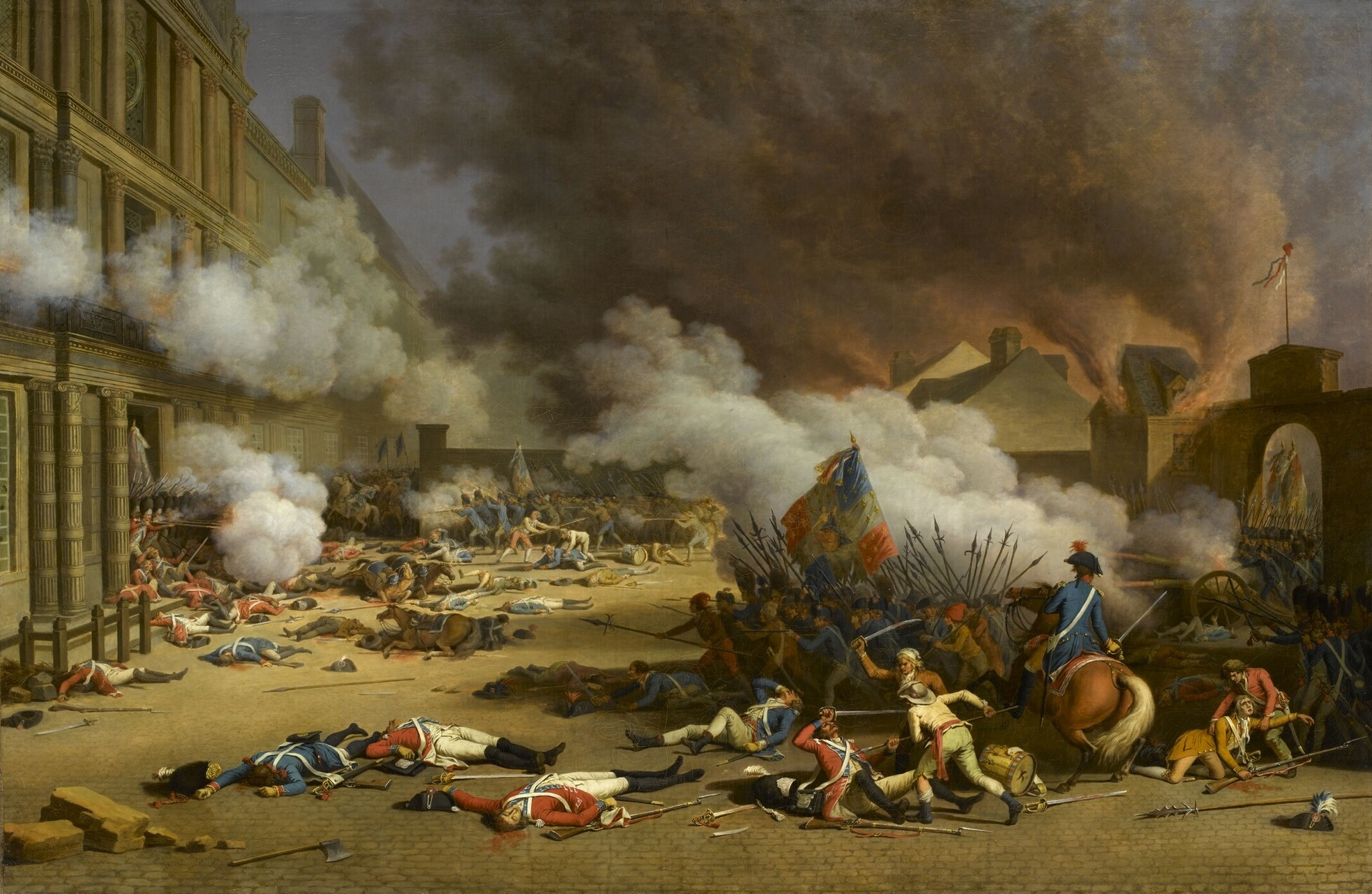
The insurrection of 10 August 1792

Bachmann entered the French Army as a cadet in 1749. He was soon promoted to ensign in his father's company in the Régiment de Castella, and in 1750 was promoted to Captain of the Grenadiers of the same regiment. He became the owner of two of the regiment's companies in 1756 and in 1762 was promoted to major of the Régiment Waldner von Freudenstein. In 1764, Bachmann joined the Swiss Guards as a lieutenant-colonel. He was promoted to brigadier in 1768, then to maréchal de camp in 1770. He received the Royal and Military Order of Saint Louis in 1778. In 1792, Bachmann became the owner of a company of the Swiss Guards Regiment.

=== Insurrection of 10 August 1792 ===
Bachmann was in direct charge of the 900 Swiss Guards present during the insurrection of 10 August 1792, when French revolutionaries stormed the Tuileries Palace. The nominal commander of the Guard, the elderly Colonel Louis-Auguste-Augustin d'Affry, was in poor health and had delegated Bachmann to bring the regiment into central Paris during the evening of 9 August. Having deployed his Swiss to defend the palace Bachmann escorted King Louis XVI and the Royal Family to the National Assembly, where they sought refuge. For reasons that are not clear, Bachmann did not give any instructions to his subordinates left behind in the Tuileries. About 650 Swiss Guards were subsequently killed, either during the fighting which broke out spontaneously shortly afterwards, or massacred after surrender.

Arrested by the revolutionaries, Bachmann was accused of treason for ordering the Swiss Guards to resist the storming of the royal palace and thereby offending the "Majesty of the People". Bachmann refused to acknowledge the tribunal which was trying him, as the Swiss soldiers in French service were entitled to be tried by their own courts. His trial was interrupted in the late afternoon of 2 September 1792 when the September Massacres of hundreds of political prisoners took place at the Conciergerie and Abbaye prisons. A mob invaded the courtroom where Bachmann and other Swiss Guards were being tried before the official Tribunal of 17 August. The crowd retreated when ordered to clear the room by the presiding judges and Bachmann "passed through their shambles unharmed on his way to the scaffold". Bachmann was then formally sentenced to death, and guillotined on 3 September 1792. He stepped onto the scaffold still wearing the red coat of the Swiss Guard.

== The Dying Lion in Lucerne ==
Bachmann's name is engraved on the Dying Lion monument in Lucerne, by Bertel Thorvaldsen, where he figures as second on the list of the fallen Swiss Guards.

== External links and sources ==
- "Karl Josef Anton Leodegar von Bachmann" in German, French and Italian in the online Historical Dictionary of Switzerland.
