= Lion Monument =

Sculpture in Lucerne by Bertel Thorvaldsen

- Löwendenkmal
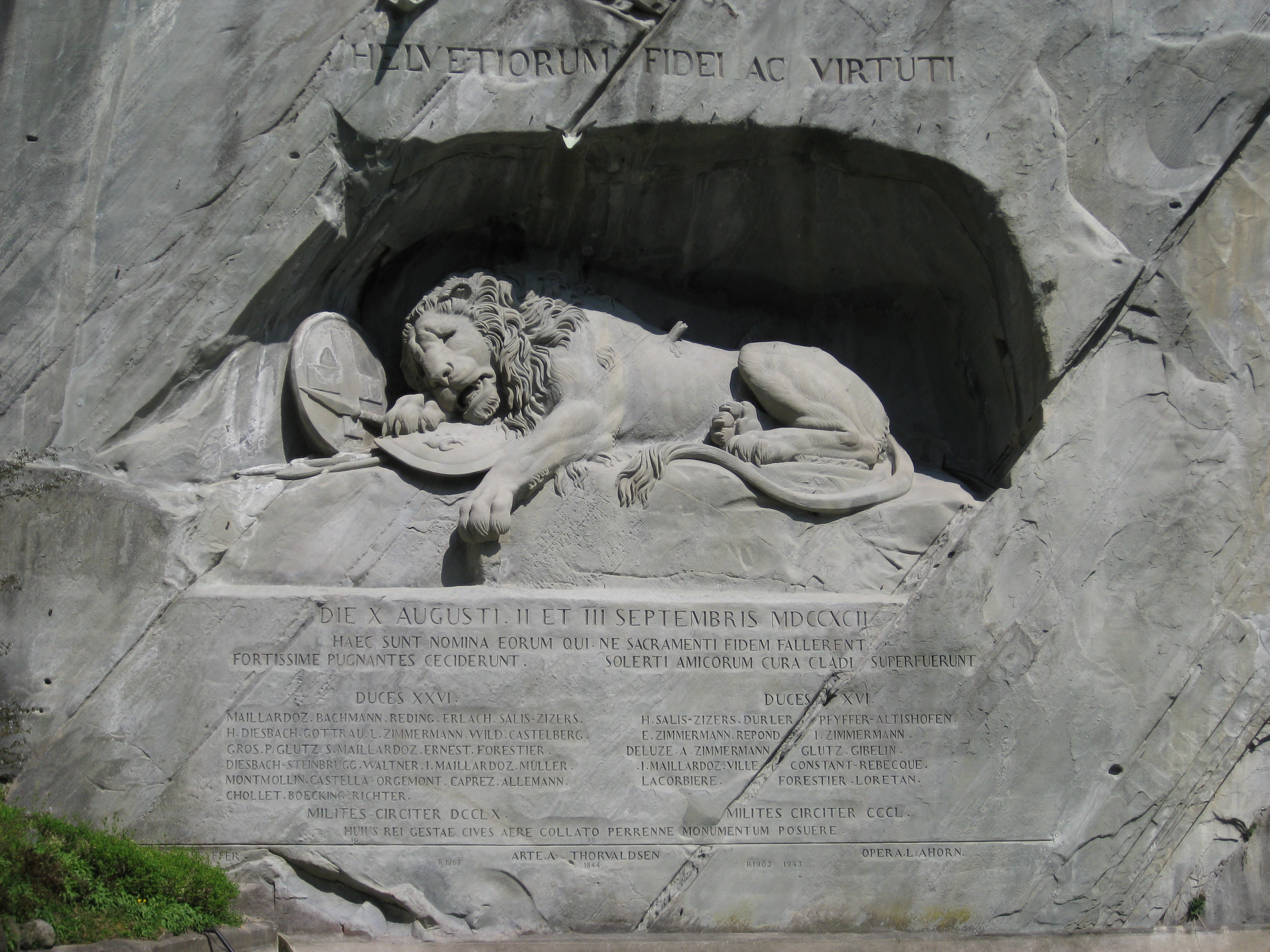
- Interactive map of Lion Monument
- Location: Lucerne, Switzerland
- Coordinates: 47°03′30″N 8°18′38″E
- Designer: Bertel Thorvaldsen
- Type: Memorial
- Material: Sandstone
- Beginning date: 1820
- Completion date: 1821

The Lion Monument (German: Löwendenkmal), or the Lion of Lucerne, is a rock relief in Lucerne, Switzerland, designed by Bertel Thorvaldsen and hewn in 1820–21 by Lukas Ahorn. It commemorates the Swiss Guards who were killed in 1792 during the French Revolution, when revolutionaries stormed the Tuileries Palace in Paris. It is one of the most famous monuments in Switzerland, visited annually by about 1.4 million tourists. In 2006, it was placed under Swiss monument protection.

American author Mark Twain praised the sculpture of a mortally wounded lion as "the most mournful and moving piece of stone in the world."

== Background ==
From the early 17th century, a regiment of Swiss Guards had served as part of the Royal Household of France. On 6 October 1789, King Louis XVI had been forced to move with his family from the Palace of Versailles to the Tuileries Palace in Paris. In June 1791, he tried to flee to Montmédy near the frontier, where troops under royalist officers were concentrated. In the 10th of August Insurrection (1792), revolutionaries stormed the palace.

Fighting broke out after the Royal Family had been escorted from the Tuileries to take refuge with the Legislative Assembly. The Swiss Guards ran low on ammunition and were overwhelmed by superior numbers. A note written by the King, half an hour after firing had commenced, has survived, ordering the Swiss to retire and return to their barracks. Delivered in the middle of the fighting, this was only acted on after their position had become untenable.

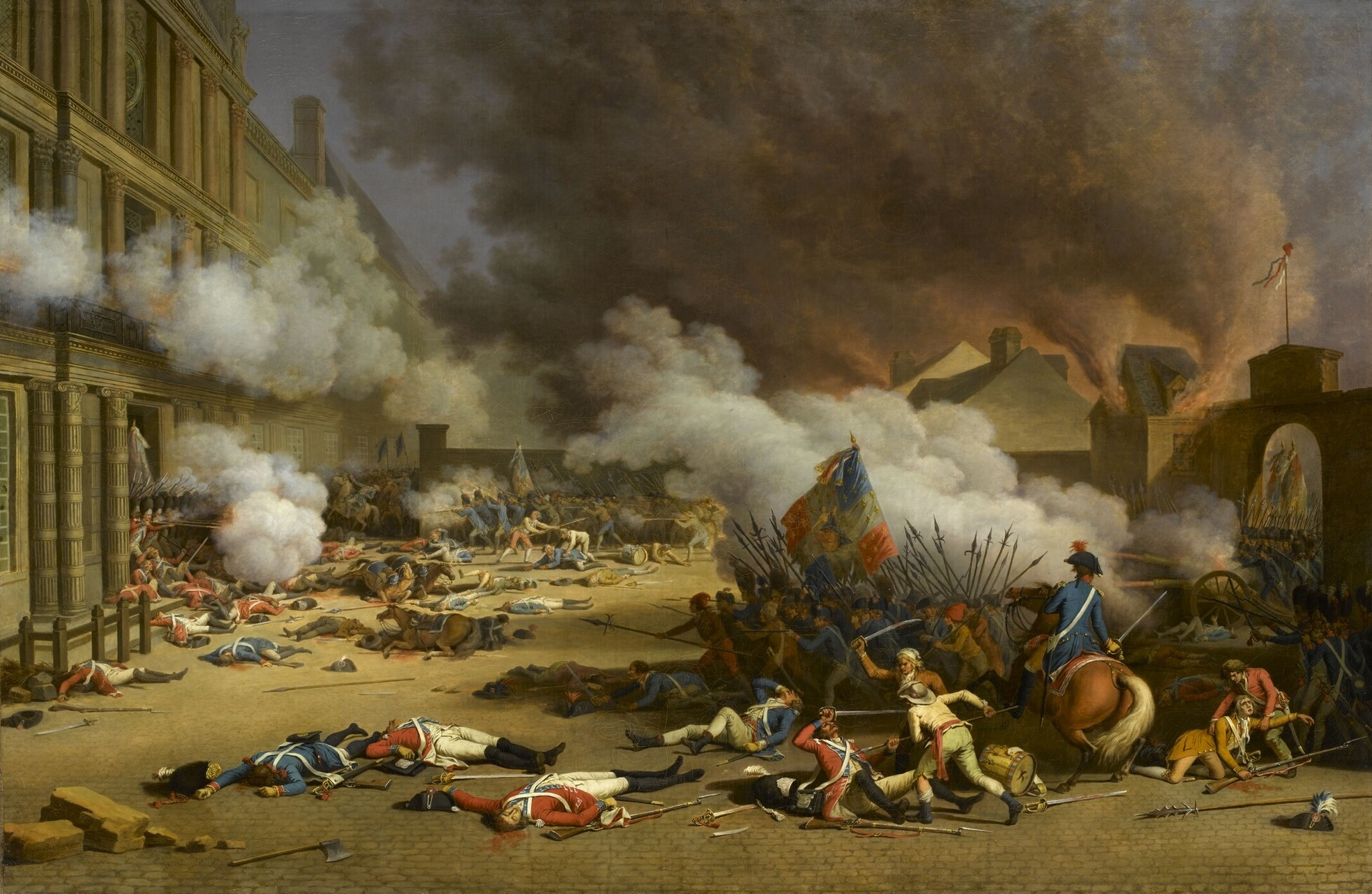
Storming of the Tuileries on 10. Aug. 1792 during the French Revolution, Jacques Bertaux 1793

Around 760 of the Swiss Guards defending the Tuileries were killed during the fighting or massacred after surrender. This number is possibly too high, according to late 20th-century research. An estimated two hundred more died in prison of their wounds or were killed during the September Massacres that followed.

Apart from about a hundred Swiss who escaped from the Tuileries, the only survivors of the regiment were a 300 strong detachment which had been sent to Normandy, under the king's orders, to escort grain convoys a few days before August 10. The Swiss officers were mostly amongst those massacred, although Major Karl Josef von Bachmann — in command at the Tuileries — was formally tried and guillotined in September, still wearing his red uniform of the Guard. Two surviving Swiss officers achieved a senior rank under Napoleon.

Among the Swiss Guards in France who survived the insurrection and soldiers from the eleven disbanded Swiss line regiments, about 350 later joined the Revolutionary Armies of the French Republic. Others joined the counter-revolutionaries in the War in the Vendée. In 1817, the Swiss Federal Diet awarded the commemorative medal Treue und Ehre (Loyalty and Honor) to 389 of the survivors of the regiment.

== Memorial ==
Karl Pfyffer von Altishofen, an officer of the Guards who had been on leave in Lucerne at the time of the August fight, later wrote a book detailing the role of the regiment of Swiss Guards during the French Revolution. This book created a strong reaction throughout conservative circles in Switzerland, which motivated him to organize a public subscription to finance a commemorative monument. He began collecting money in 1818, primarily from European Royal houses. He commissioned Danish sculptor Bertel Thorvaldsen to design the image, and contracted stonemason Lukas Ahorn to fashion the monument in a former sandstone quarry near Lucerne.

The monument is dedicated Helvetiorum Fidei ac Virtuti ("To the loyalty and bravery of the Swiss"). Carved into the cliff face, the monument measures ten metres (32.8 feet) in length and six metres (19.7 feet) in height. The dying lion is portrayed impaled by a spear, covering a shield bearing the fleur-de-lis of the French monarchy. Beside him is another shield bearing the coat of arms of Switzerland. The inscription below the sculpture lists the names of the officers, and gives the approximate numbers of soldiers who died (DCCLX = 760), and survived (CCCL = 350). The work was completed in 1821.

The fleur-de-lis of the House of Bourbon

Coat of arms of Switzerland.

The Lion Monument at night

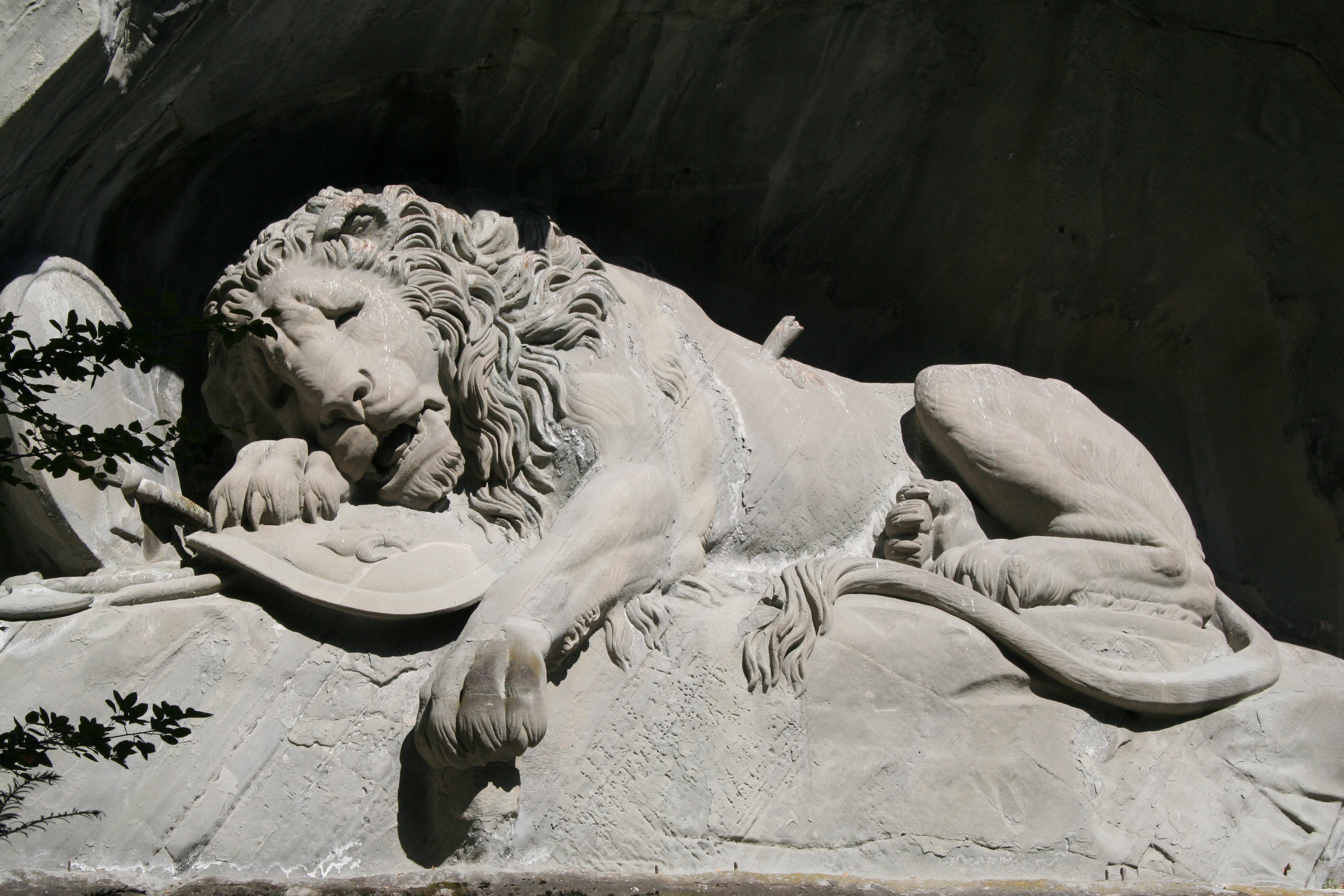

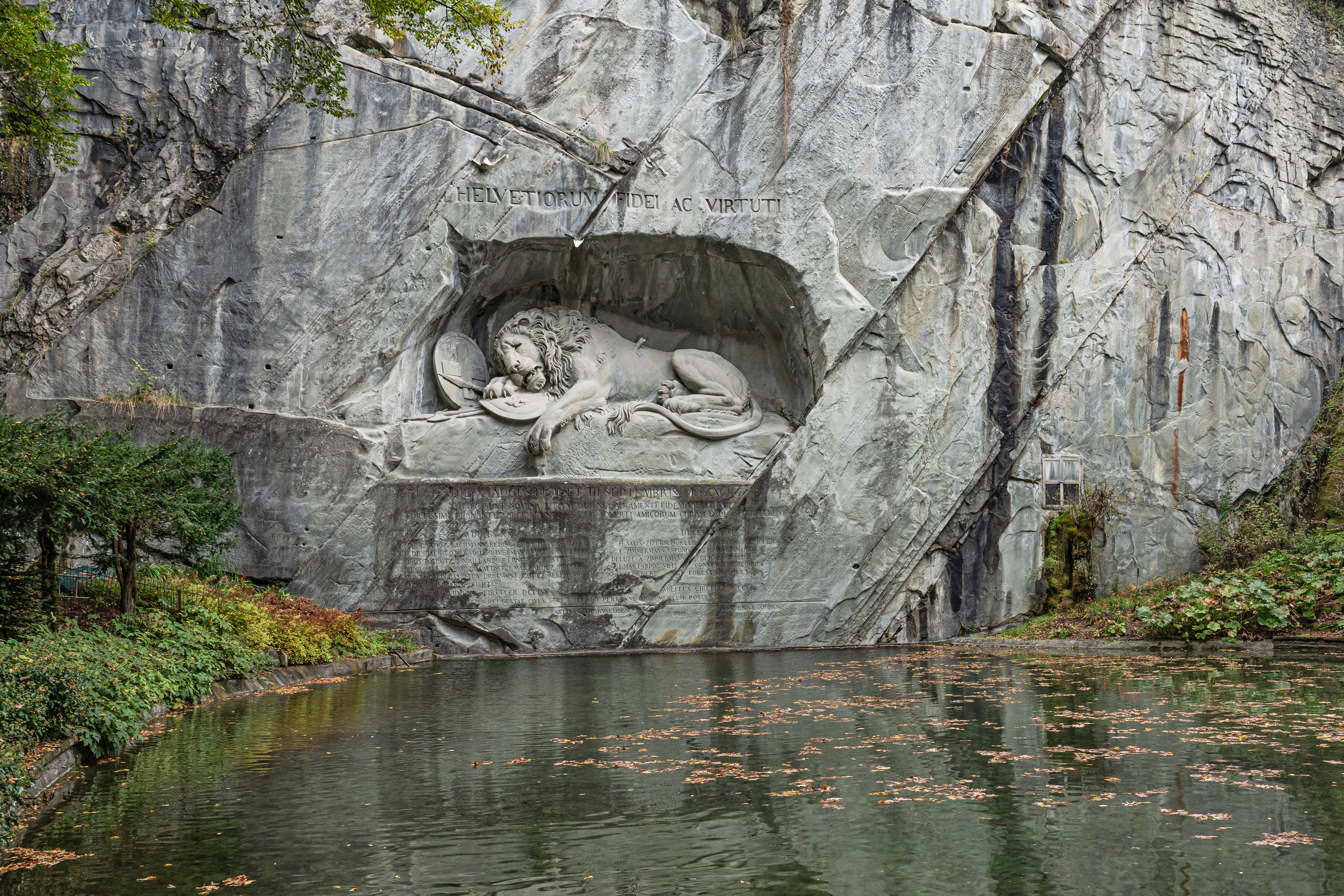
The Lion Monument in 2022

== Reception ==
Even before the monument was built, there was concern for its political message glorifying the ancien régime. It immediately elicited a combination of praise, national pride, and public criticism, with some displeased that a monument was built to honor Swiss citizens dying for a foreign monarchy. Swiss liberals felt that the personification of Switzerland as a lion seemed to glorify a conservative, counter-revolutionary mindset, and some threatened to saw off one of the lion's paws in protest.

In 1880, Mark Twain wrote of the monument:

The Lion lies in his lair in the perpendicular face of a low cliff—for he is carved from the living rock of the cliff. His size is colossal, his attitude is noble. His head is bowed, the broken spear is sticking in his shoulder, his protecting paw rests upon the lilies of France. Vines hang down the cliff and wave in the wind, and a clear stream trickles from above and empties into a pond at the base, and in the smooth surface of the pond the lion is mirrored, among the water-lilies. Around about are green trees and grass. The place is a sheltered, reposeful woodland nook, remote from noise and stir and confusion—and all this is fitting, for lions do die in such places, and not on granite pedestals in public squares fenced with fancy iron railings. The Lion of Lucerne would be impressive anywhere, but nowhere so impressive as where he is.

— Mark Twain, A Tramp Abroad (1880)

== References in literature and culture ==
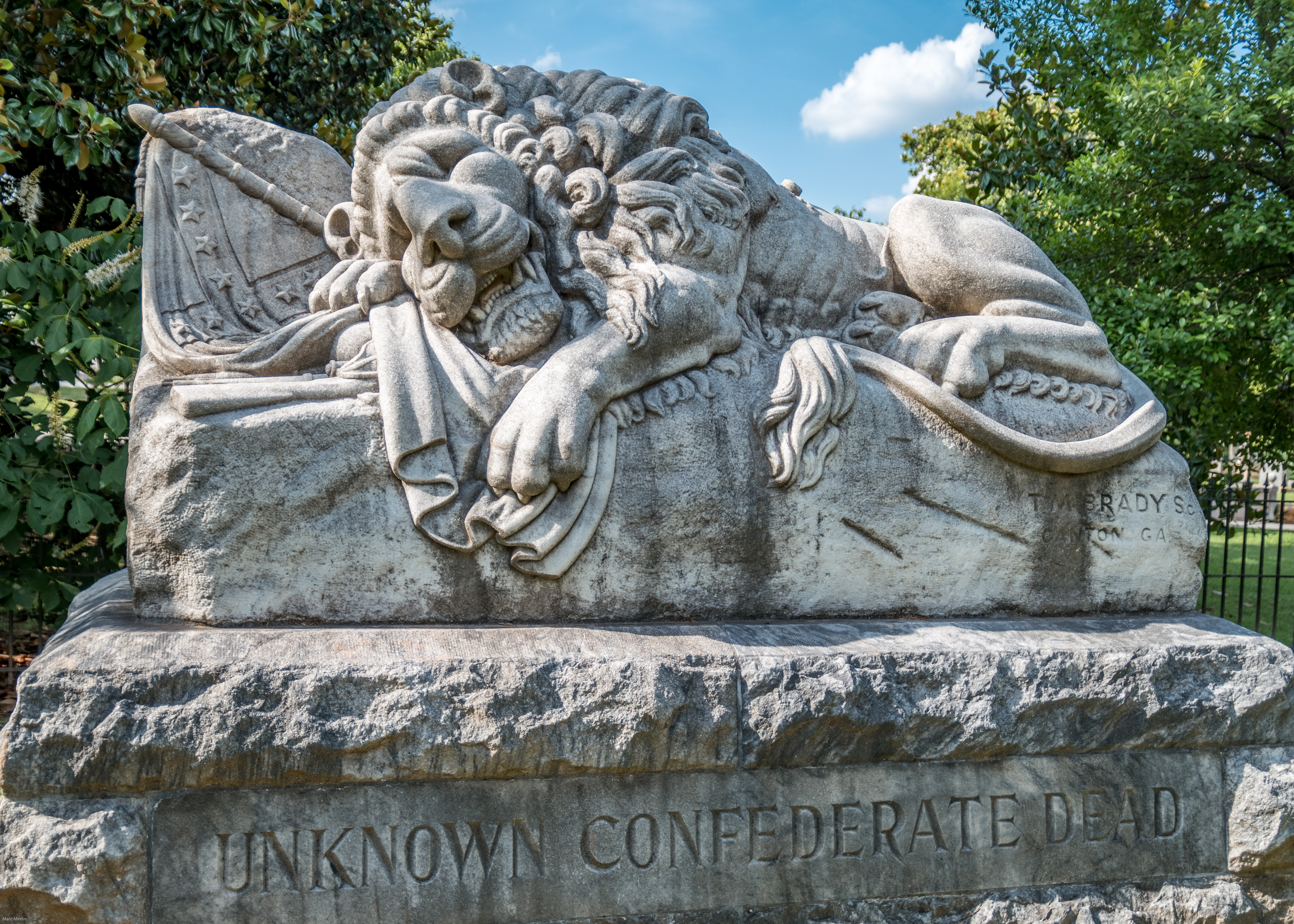
The Lion, a Confederate monument based on the Lion Monument

- The monument is described by Thomas Carlyle in The French Revolution: A History (1837).
- In The Chalet School Does It Again (1955), Elinor Brent-Dyer describes the monument, its history and the associated chapel.
- In The Lions of Lucerne (2002) author Brad Thor describes the monument and the Swiss Guard that it commemorates.
- In her New Yorker tribute "My Buddy" (2017), Patti Smith, while standing in front of the monument, reflects upon the death of Sam Shepard.
- Although sculptor T. M. Brady denied it, his large marble sculpture The Lion was a near-identical copy of the Lucerne Lion. It was installed in the Oakland Cemetery in Atlanta, Georgia in 1894 to honor fallen soldiers of the Confederacy during the American Civil War. That monument became a target of anti-racist sentiment in the 21st century, and was removed from the cemetery on 7 August 2021.

== See also ==
- List of colossal sculptures in situ
