= Swiss Guards =

Units serving European courts

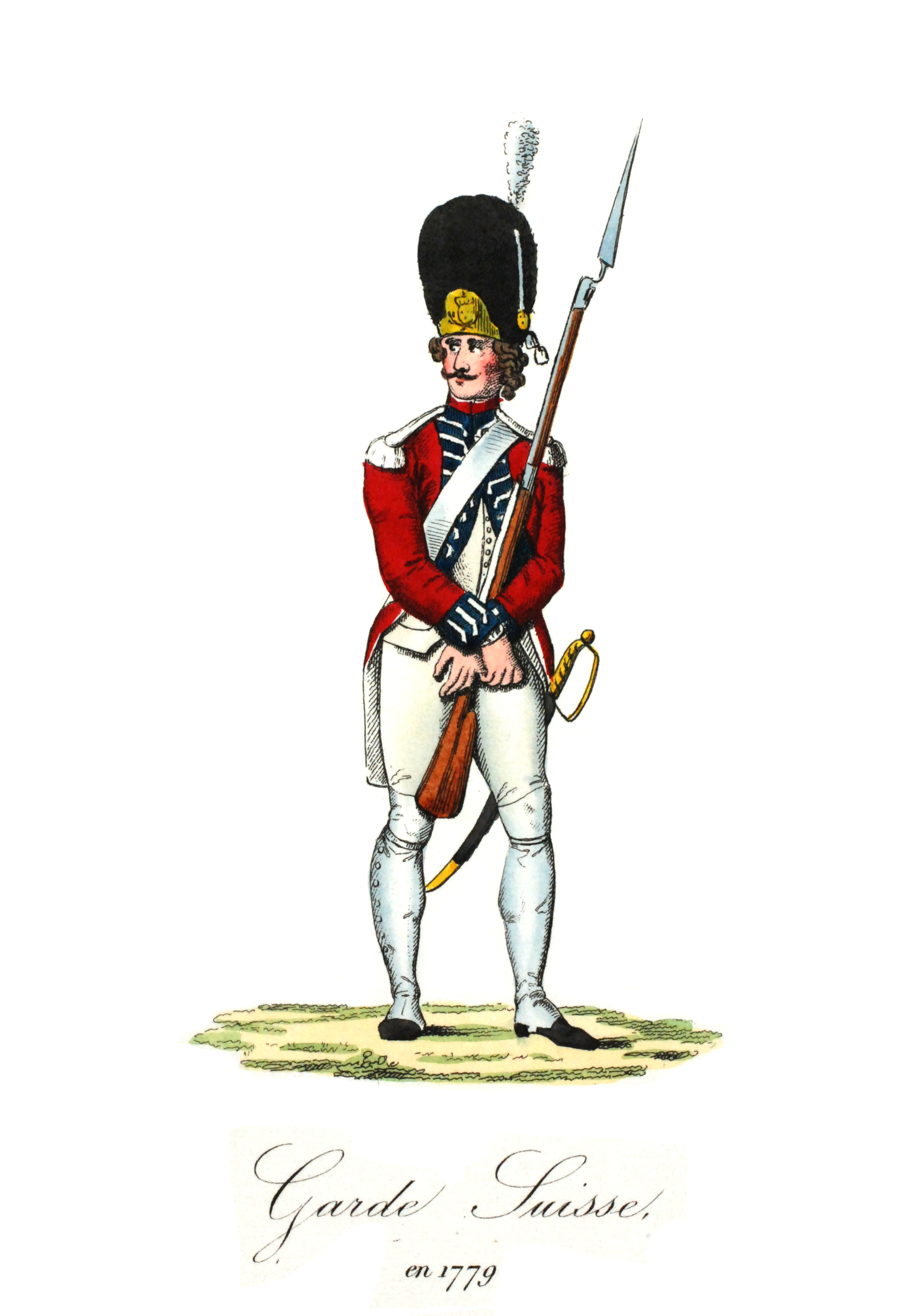
A grenadier of the Swiss Guard in France, 1779

Swiss Guards (French: Gardes Suisses [ɡaʁd sɥis]; German: Schweizergarde [ˈʃvaɪ̯tsɐˌɡaʁdə]; Italian: Guardie Svizzere [ˈɡwardje ˈzvittsere]) are Swiss soldiers who have served as guards at foreign European courts since the late 15th century. The earliest Swiss Guard unit to be established on a permanent basis was the Hundred Swiss (Cent-Suisses), which served at the French court from 1490 to 1817. This small force was complemented in 1616 by a Swiss Guards regiment. In the 18th and early 19th centuries several other Swiss Guard units existed for periods in various European courts.

Foreign military service was outlawed by the first Swiss Federal Constitution of 1848 and a federal Law of 1859, with the only exception being the Pontifical Swiss Guard (Latin: Pontificia Cohors Helvetica, Cohors Pedestris Helvetiorum a Sacra Custodia Pontificis; Italian: Guardia Svizzera Pontificia) stationed in Vatican City. The modern Papal Swiss Guard serves as both a ceremonial unit and a bodyguard. Established in 1506, it is one of the oldest military units in the world. It is also the smallest army in the world.

== In France ==
Two different units of Swiss mercenaries performed guard duties for the Kings of France: the Hundred Swiss (Cent Suisses) served in the Palace as bodyguards and ceremonial troops, and the Swiss Guards (Gardes Suisses), who guarded entrances and outer perimeter. In addition, the Gardes Suisses served in the field as a fighting regiment in times of war.

=== Hundred Swiss (Cent Suisses) ===
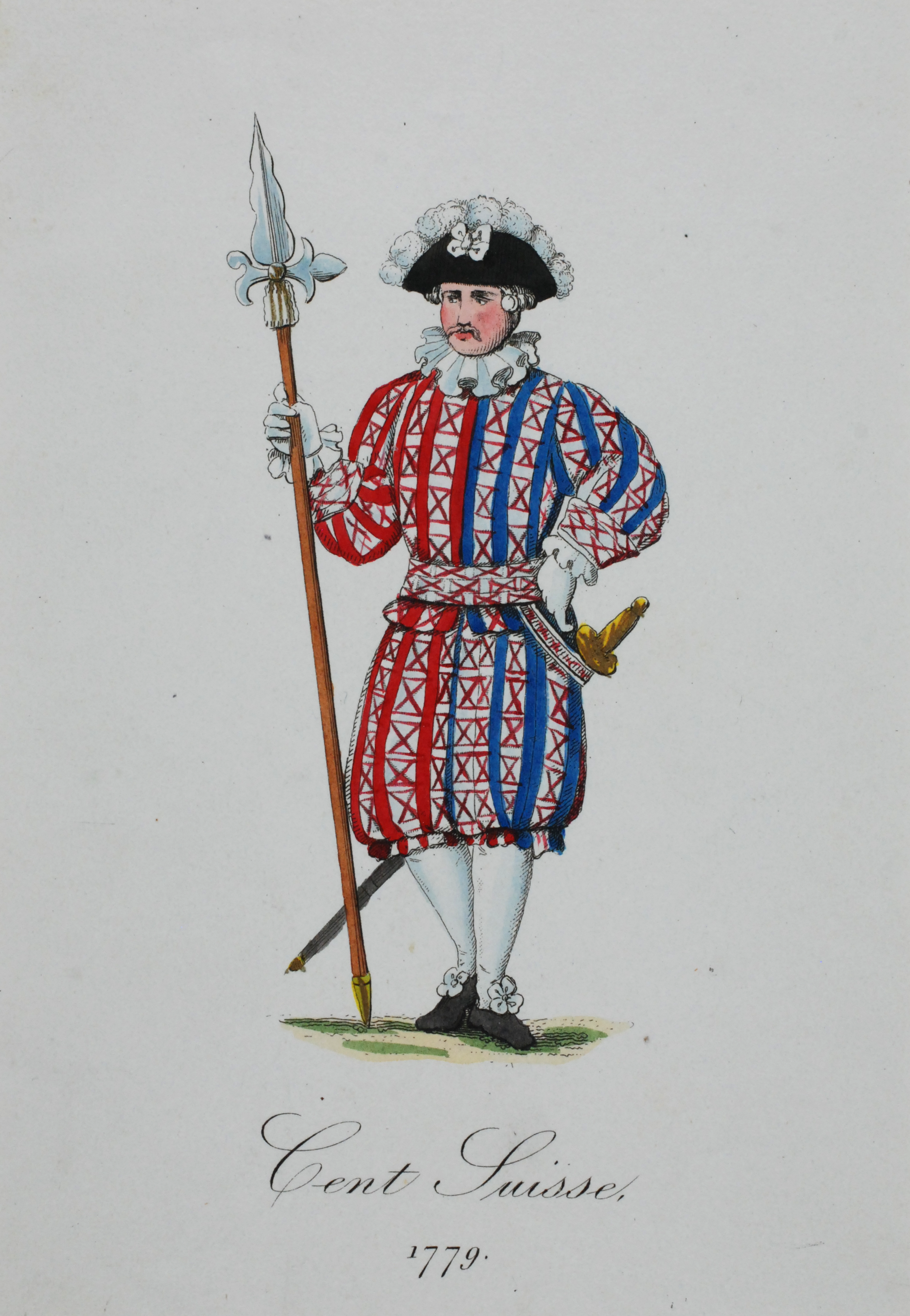
A soldier of the Cent-Suisses in full dress uniform, 1779

The Hundred Swiss were created in 1480 when Louis XI retained a Swiss company for his personal guard. By 1496 they comprised one hundred guardsmen and about twenty-seven officers and sergeants. Their main role was to protect the King in the palace as the garde du dedans du Louvre (the Louvre indoor guard), but in the earlier part of their history they also accompanied the King to war. In the Battle of Pavia (1525) the Hundred Swiss of Francis I were slain before Francis was captured by the Spanish. The Hundred Swiss shared indoor guard duties with the King's Bodyguards (Garde du Corps), who were French.

The Hundred Swiss were armed with halberds, the blade of which carried the Royal arms in gold, as well as gold-hilted swords. Their ceremonial dress until 1789 comprised an elaborate 16th-century Swiss costume covered with braid and livery lace. A surviving example is on display in the Musée de l'Armée in Paris. A less ornate dark blue and red uniform with bearskin headdress was worn for ordinary duties.

The Cent Suisses company was disbanded after Louis XVI left the Palace of Versailles in October 1789. It was refounded on 15 July 1814 with an establishment of 136 guardsmen and eight officers. In 1815, the Hundred Swiss accompanied Louis XVIII into exile in Belgium and returned with him to Paris following the Battle of Waterloo. The unit then resumed its traditional role as palace guards at the Tuileries. In 1817, it was replaced by a new guard company drawn from the French regiments of the Royal Guard.

=== Swiss Guards (Gardes Suisses) ===
In 1616, Louis XIII gave an existing regiment of Swiss infantry the name of Gardes suisses (Swiss Guards). The new regiment primarily protected the doors, gates and outer perimeters of the royal palaces.

By the end of the 17th century the Swiss Guards were part of the Maison militaire du roi. They were brigaded with the Gardes françaises (French Guards Regiment), with whom they shared the outer guard. In peacetime they were stationed in barracks on the outskirts of Paris. Like the eleven Swiss regiments of line infantry in French service, the Gardes suisses wore red coats. The line regiments had black, yellow or light blue facings. The Swiss Guards were distinguished by dark blue lapels and cuffs edged in white embroidery. Only the grenadier company wore bearskins, while the other companies wore the standard tricorn headdress of the French infantry.

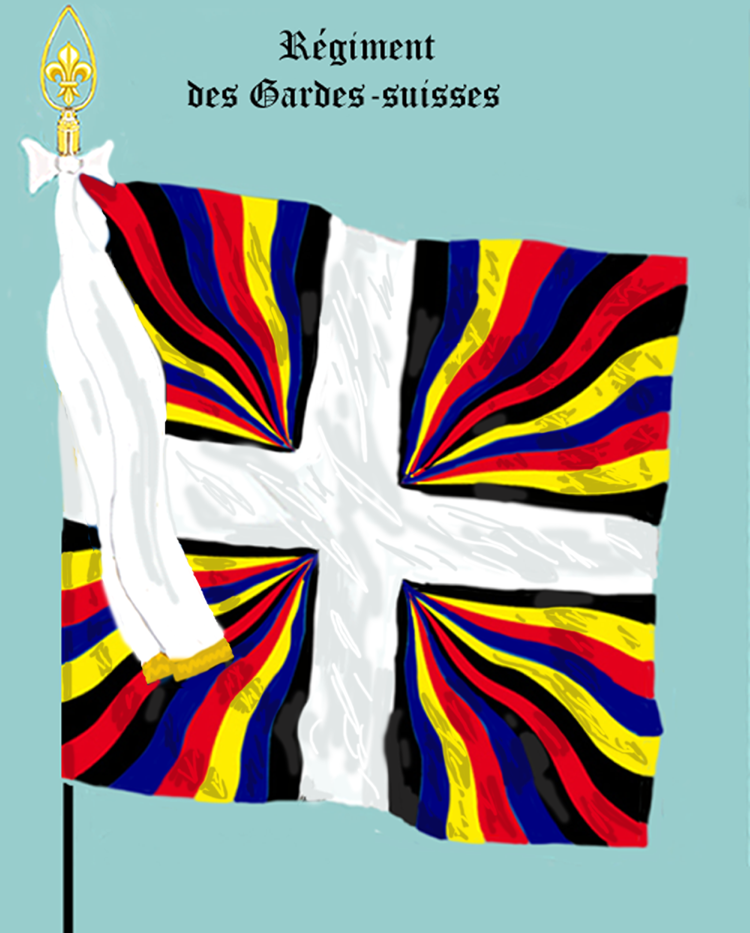
Regimental flag of the Swiss Guards

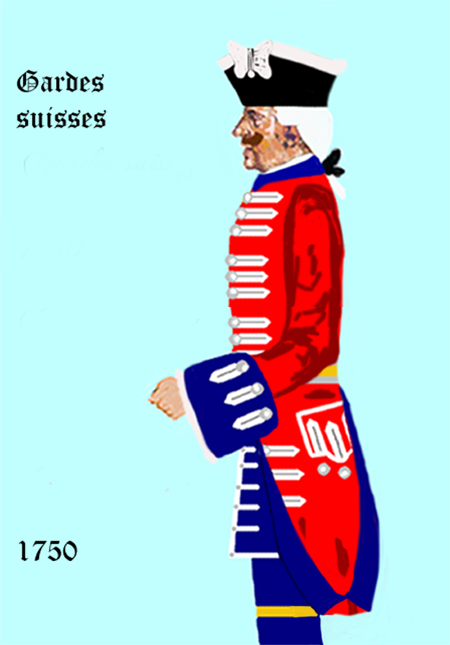
Uniform of the Swiss Guards c. 1750

During the 17th and 18th centuries the Swiss Guards maintained a reputation for discipline and steadiness in both peacetime service and foreign campaigning. Their officers were all Swiss and their rate of pay was substantially higher than that of the regular French soldiers.

The Guards were recruited from all Swiss cantons. The nominal establishment was 1,600 men though actual numbers seem to have normally been below this. Disciplinary matters were the responsibility of Swiss officers within the regiment, under a code of punishments that was significantly harsher than that of the remainder of the French army.

=== During the Revolution ===
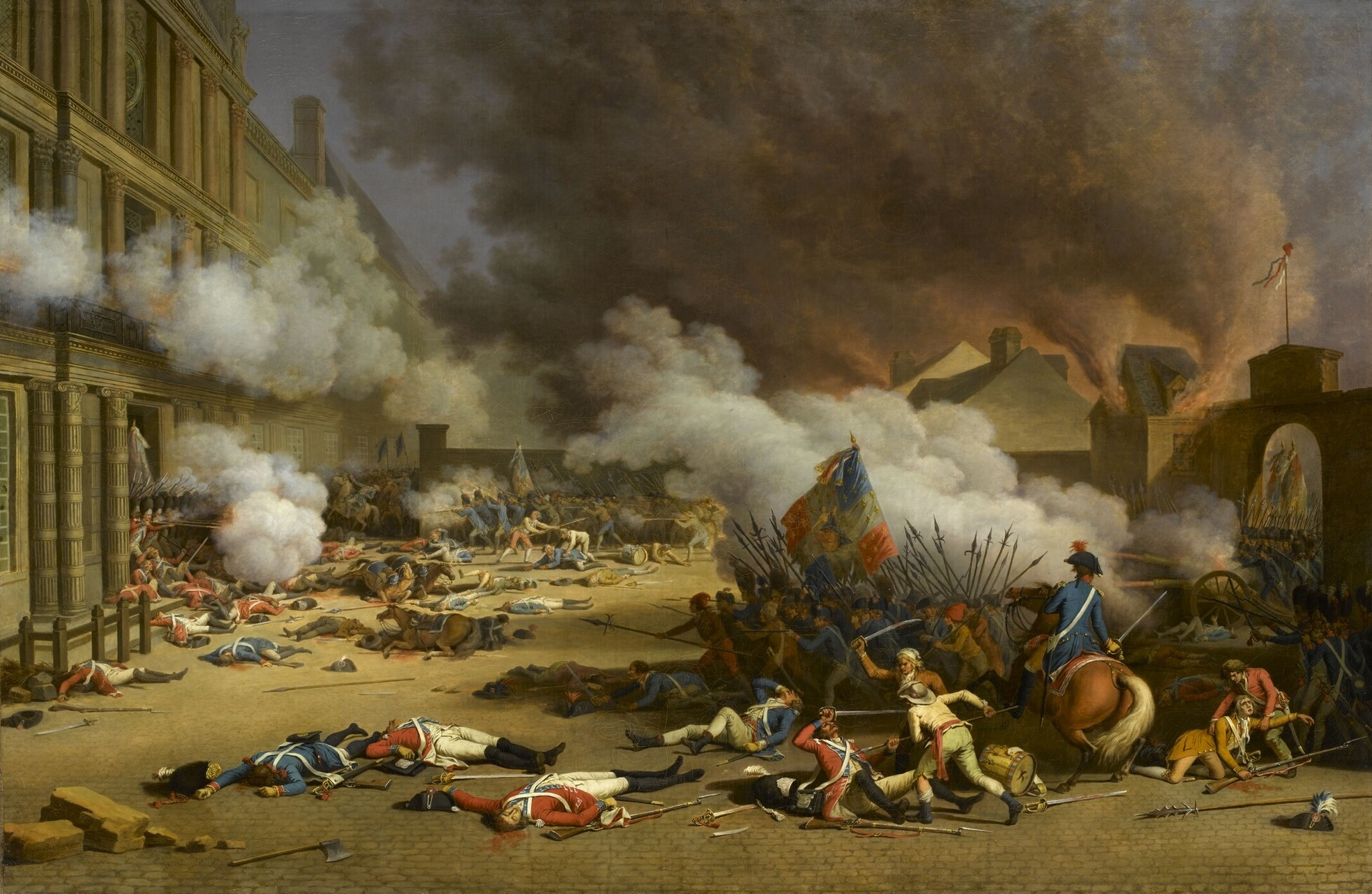
Massacre of the Swiss Guards. One of the few who survived the massacre was Victor von Gibelin. He became known for his eyewitness account of the events surrounding the Storming of the Palais des Tuileries on 10 August 1792

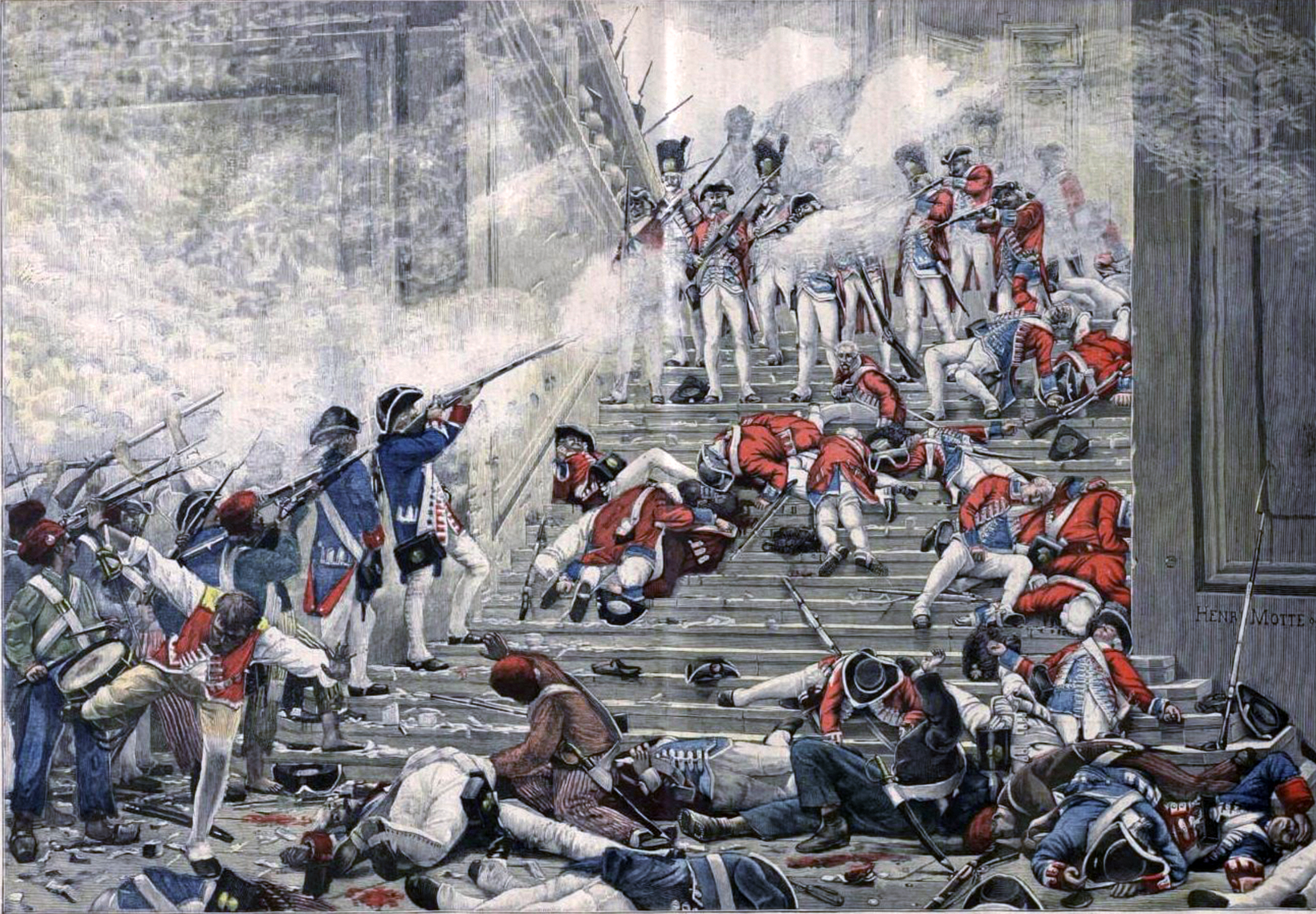
Swiss Guards on the grand staircase of the palace during the storming of the Tuileries

The most famous episode in the history of the Swiss Guards was their defence of the Tuileries Palace in central Paris during the French Revolution. Of the nine hundred Swiss Guards defending the palace on 10 August 1792, about six hundred were killed during the fighting or massacred after they surrendered. One group of sixty Swiss were taken as prisoners to the Paris City Hall before being killed by the crowd there.

An estimated one hundred and sixty more died in prison of their wounds, or were killed during the September Massacres that followed. Apart from fewer than a hundred Swiss who escaped from the Tuileries, some hidden by sympathetic Parisians, the only survivors of the regiment were a three-hundred-strong detachment that had been sent to Normandy to escort grain convoys a few days before 10 August.

The Swiss officers were mostly massacred, although Major Karl Josef von Bachmann, in command at the Tuileries, was formally tried and guillotined in September, still wearing his red uniform coat. Two Swiss officers, the captains Henri de Salis and Joseph Zimmermann survived, and went on to reach a senior rank under Napoleon and the Restoration.

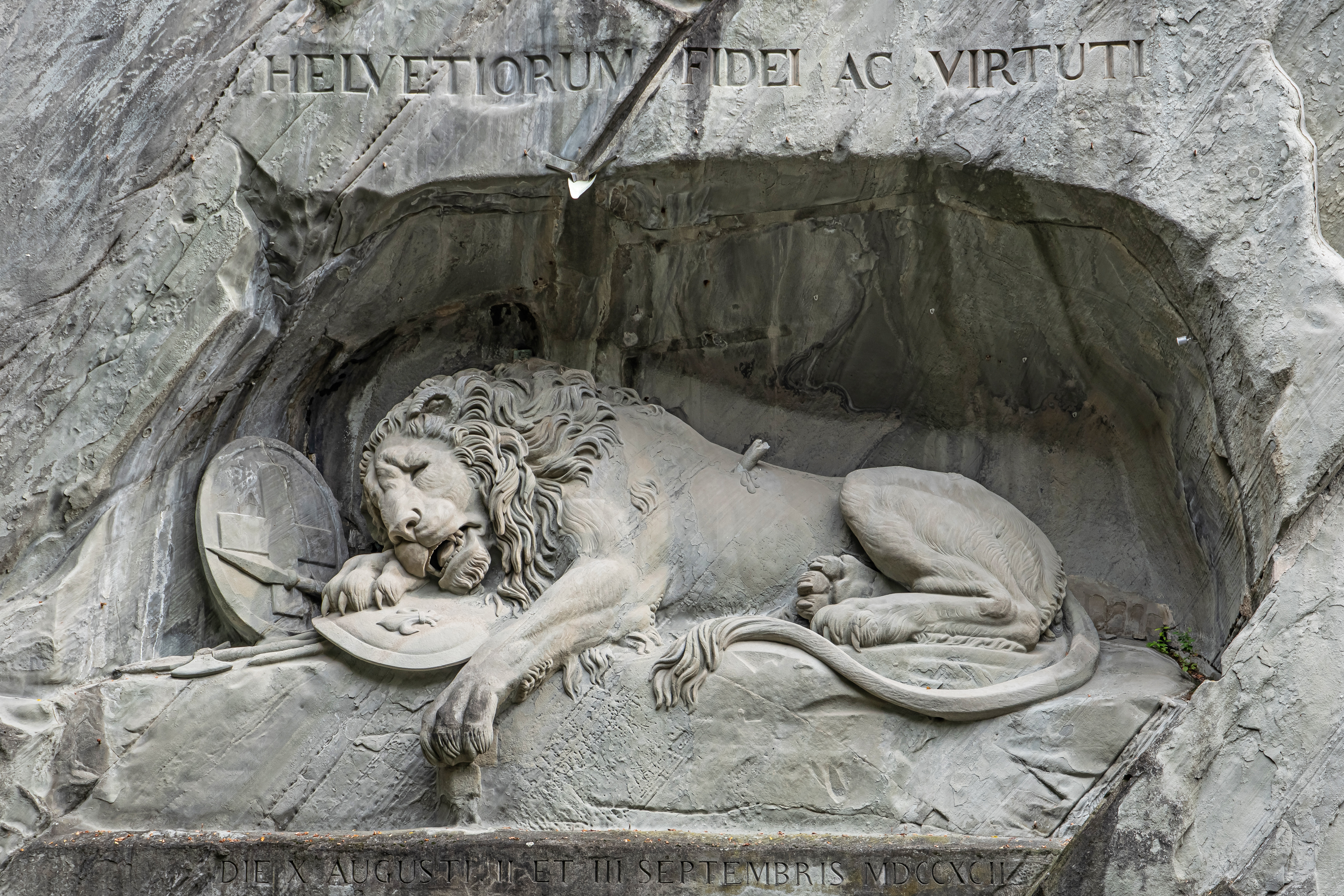
The Lion Monument in Lucerne, dedicated to the Swiss Guard who died in Paris. The incised Latin may be translated, "To the loyalty and courage of the Swiss".

There appears to be no truth in the charge that Louis XVI caused the defeat and destruction of the Guards by ordering them to lay down their arms when they could still have held the Tuileries. Rather, the Swiss ran low on ammunition and were overwhelmed by superior numbers when fighting broke out spontaneously after the royal family were escorted from the palace to take refuge with the National Assembly. A note written by the King has survived that ordered the Swiss to retreat from the palace and return to their barracks, but they only did so after their position became untenable.

The regimental standards were secretly buried by the adjutant shortly before the regiment was summoned to the Tuileries on the night of 8/9 August, indicating that he foresaw the likely end. They were discovered by a gardener and ceremoniously burned by the new Republican authorities on 14 August. The barracks of the Guard at Courbevoie were stormed by the local National Guard and the few Swiss still on duty there were also killed.

The heroic but futile stand of the Swiss is commemorated by Bertel Thorvaldsen's Lion Monument in Lucerne, dedicated in 1821, which shows a dying lion collapsed upon broken symbols of the French monarchy. An inscription on the monument lists the twenty-six Swiss officers who died on 10 August and 2–3 September 1792, and records that approximately 760 Swiss Guardsmen were killed on those days.

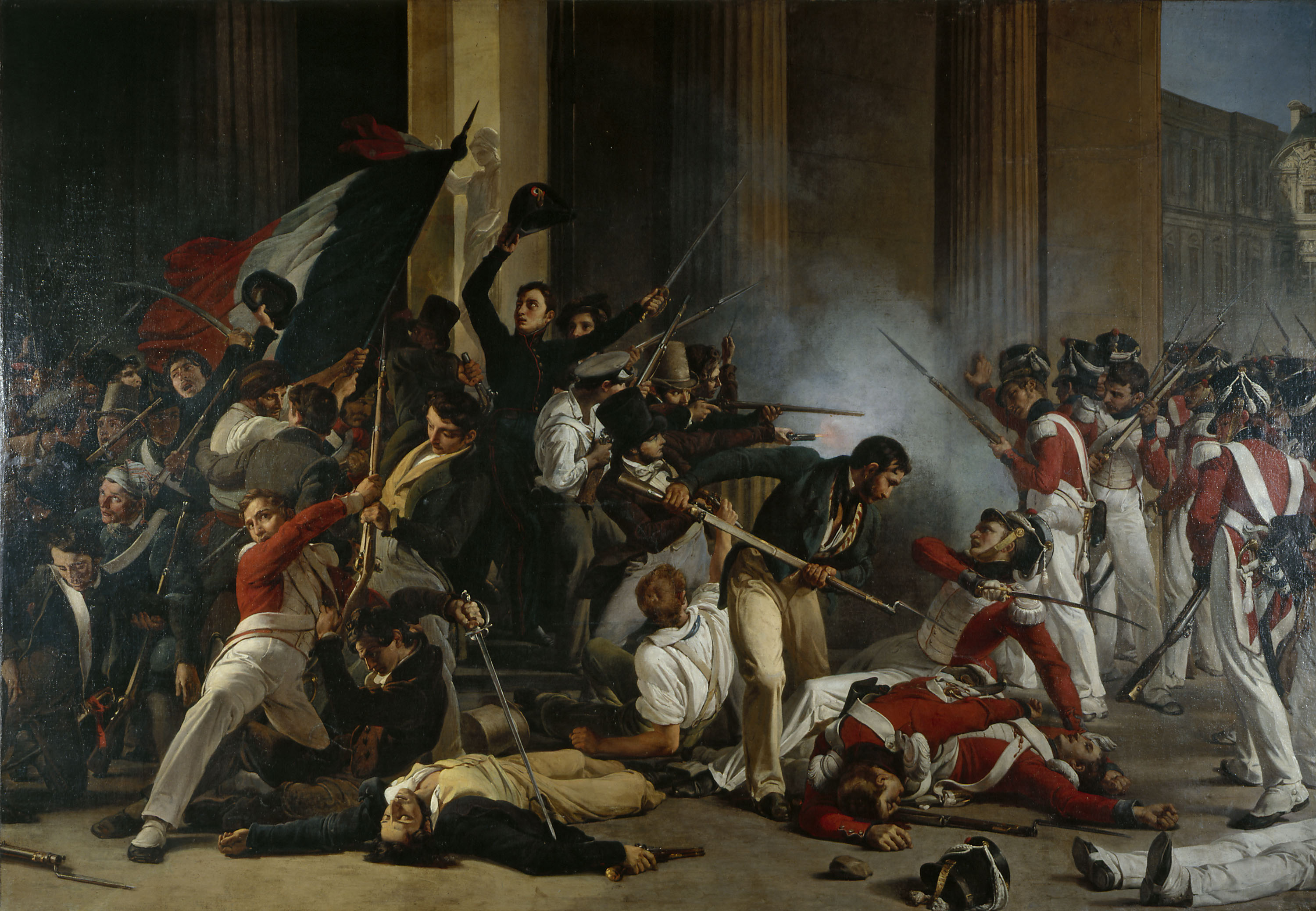
Swiss Guards during the July Revolution of 1830

=== Following the Restoration ===
The French Revolution abolished mercenary troops in its citizen army. After the Revolution, Napoleon and the Bourbon Restoration both made use of Swiss troops. Four Swiss infantry regiments served with Napoleon in both Spain and Russia. Two of the eight infantry regiments included in the Royal Guard from 1815 to 1830 were Swiss and can be regarded as successors to the Gardes suisses.

When the Tuileries was stormed again in the July Revolution of 1830, the Swiss regiments, fearful of another massacre, withdrew or melted into the crowd. They were not used again. In 1831, disbanded veterans of the Swiss regiments and another foreign unit, the Hohenlohe Regiment, were recruited into the newly raised French Foreign Legion for service in Algeria.

== Swiss in other armies ==
Swiss Guard units similar to those of France were in existence at several other Royal Courts and public entities at the dates indicated below:

- From 1579 on, a Swiss Guard served the House of Savoy, rulers of Savoy and later the Kingdom of Sardinia. The Guard was dissolved in 1798.
- From 1696 to 1713, a Swiss Guard served at the court of Frederick I of Prussia.
- A Cent-Suisse unit was in existence from 1656 to 1680, from 1725 until 1757 and again from 1763 to 1814 in the Kingdom of Saxony.
- From 1672 until 1796, a company of Swiss (Cent-Suisses) served as a personal guard for the Stadhouder of the Dutch Republic; besides a Dutch Guards Regiment. There was also a Swiss Guards Regiment from 1749 to 1796.
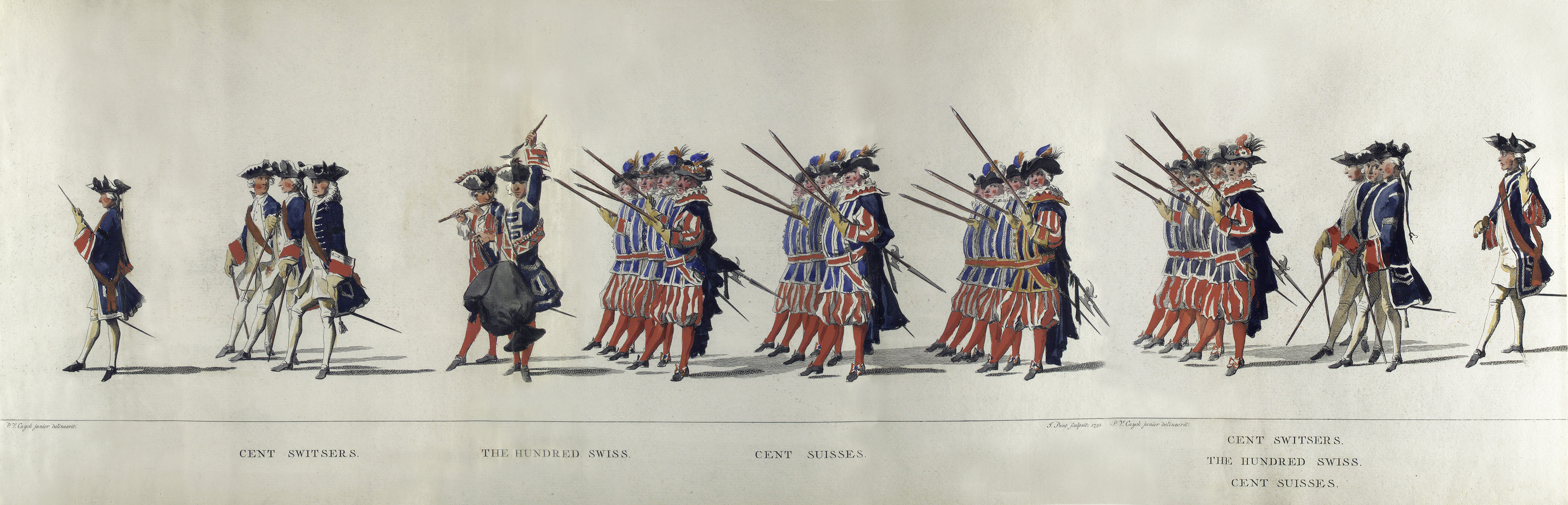
  Dutch Republic: Life guards "Cent Suisse", 1752
- The aristocratic Republic of Genoa had a Swiss Guard in service from 1609 to 1797 for its Doge's Palace and city gates.
- A Swiss Guard established in 1581 for the Duke of Lorraine, served Duke Francis-Stephen, indemnified with the Grand Duchy of Tuscany in 1737, in Florence and, crowned emperor of the Holy Roman Empire in 1745, in Austria. It was dismissed 1767 in Vienna.
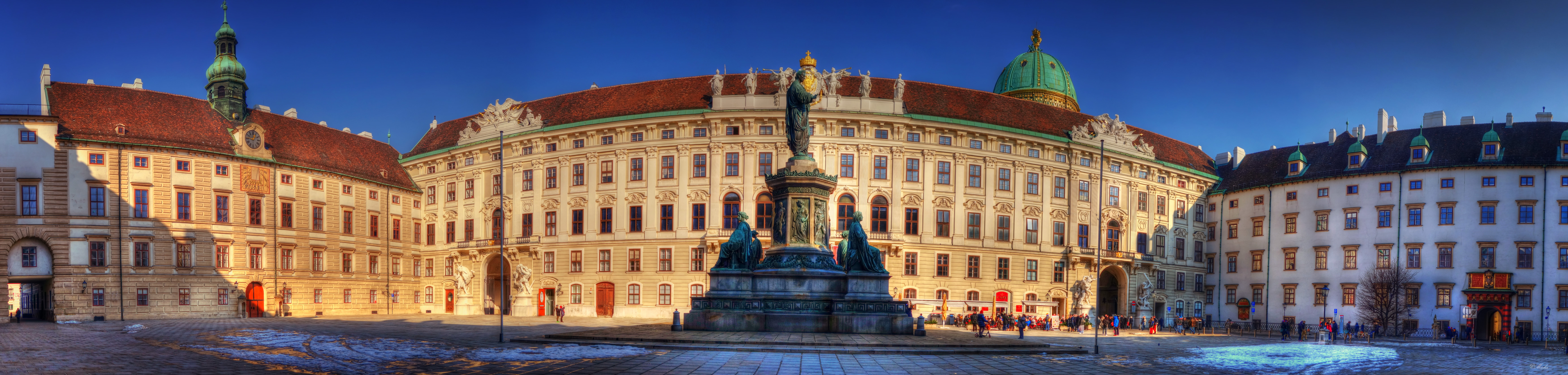
  Courtyard of the Hofburg, with the gate called Schweizertor to the right, and the statue of emperor Francis II at centre
- The Swiss Guard to the Electoral Palatinate by Rhine was several times disbanded and reformed between 1582 and 1778.
- The Gate, Palace and Treasury (Ufficio dell'Abbondanza, Italian for "office for abundance") of the City Republic of Lucca were protected by a Swiss Guard from 1663 to 1804.
- Khedive Mohamed Tewfik Pasha hired an irregular Swiss Guard in 1882 for the constabulary of Alexandria; it was dismissed the next year.
- From more than a half-dozen Swiss Life Guard units employed at various dates to protect the Pope and individual Papal legates, only the Papal Swiss Guard has survived until the present day, under a special accord with the Swiss Government.

In total, Swiss mercenary regiments have been employed as guard and regular line troops in seventeen different armies; notably those of France, Spain and Naples (see Swiss mercenaries).

== Swiss constitutional prohibition ==
The first Swiss constitution, as amended in 1848, forbade all military capitulations, a federal law, as amended 30 September 1859, all military capitulations and recruitment of Swiss by foreign powers, although volunteering of individuals in foreign armies continued until prohibited outright in 1927. The Papal Swiss Guard, reflecting the particular status of the Holy See and the Vatican City State and the character of the unit as a bodyguard, remains an exception to this prohibition, explicitly defined between the parties.

== In popular culture ==
When writing Hamlet, Shakespeare assumed (perhaps relying on his sources) that the royal house of Denmark employed a Swiss Guard: In Act IV, Scene v (line 98) he has King Claudius exclaim "Where are my Switzers? Let them guard the door". However, it may also be due to the word "Swiss" having become a generic term for a royal guard in popular European usage. Coincidentally, the present-day gatekeepers of the royal palace of Copenhagen are known as schweizere, "Swiss".

== See also ==
- Hohenlohe Regiment
- Captain D'Agoust
- Swiss mercenaries
