= Captain D'Agoust =

French military officer

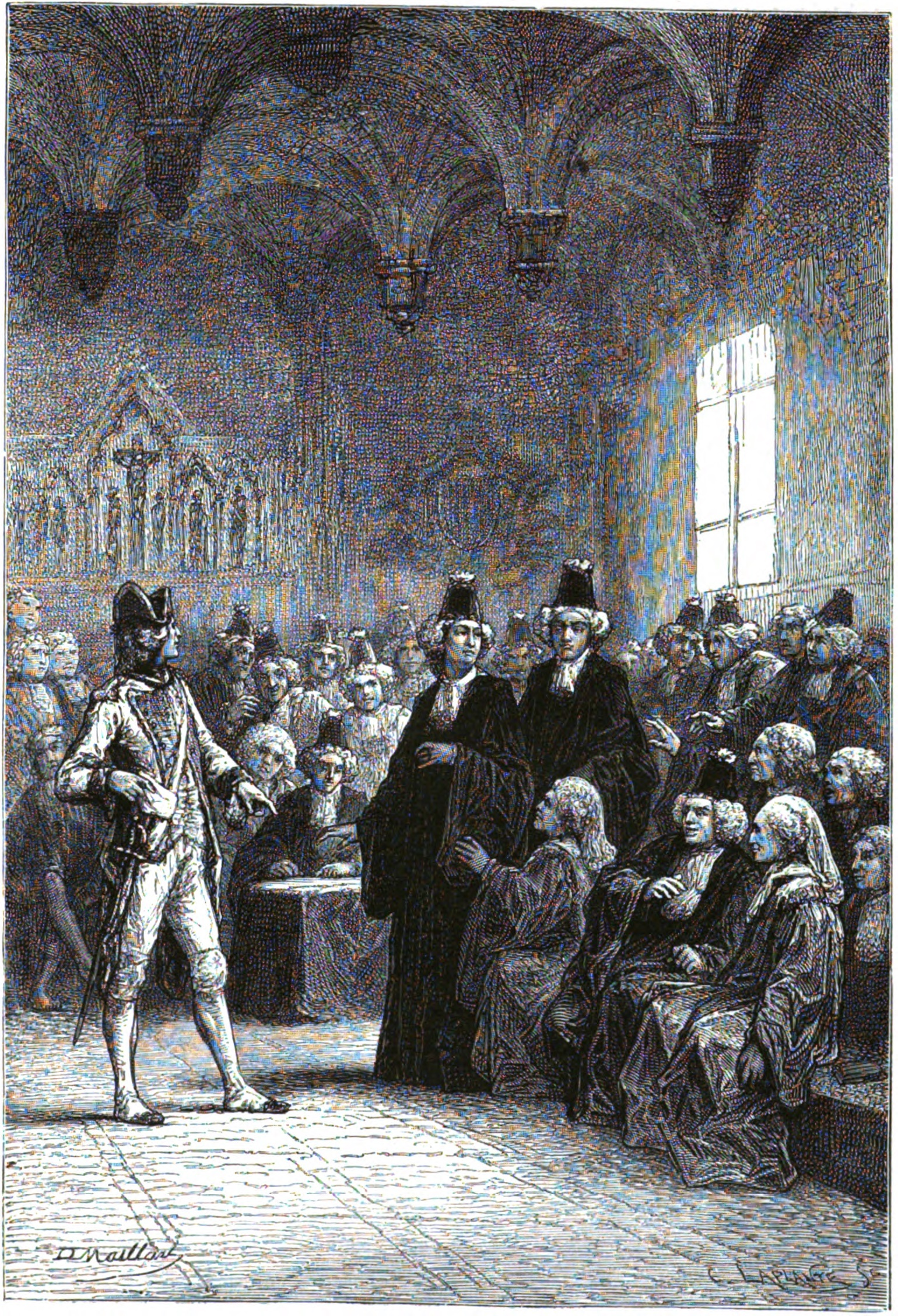
- The Marquis d'Agoult (left) arresting Duval d'Eprémesnil and Goislard de Montsabert (right) at the Parliament of Paris on May 6, 1788.
- Born: 5 December 1737; Saint-Michel, Provence-Alpes-Côte d'Azur, France
- Died: 19 February 1813 (aged 75); London, England
- Occupation: Military officer
- Known for: Removed the key from the Palais de Justice on the eve of the French Revolution

Louis-Fouquet de Vincens de Saint-Michel, marquis d'Agoult (Saint-Michel, 5 December 1737 – London, 19 February 1813) was an officer of the Gardes Françaises, described by Thomas Carlyle in his classic recounting of the French Revolution, as a "cast-iron" individual.

== Early life ==
Louis-Fouquet de Vincens was born at the Château de Saint-Michel-l'Observatoire, near Forcalquier, in Provence, on December 5, 1737, and was baptized the following day. He was the eldest of eight children born to André d'Agoult, knight, Baron of Saint-Michel, captain of the Toulouse infantry regiment, and Magdeleine Daunet de Grandmaison. He had four younger brothers and three younger sisters.

On March 22, 1768, he succeeded his father as Baron of Saint-Michel and was named “Marquis d'Agoult” by his brother, the abbot. On June 17, 1770, he was made a knight of Order of Saint Louis. A friend and confidant of King Louis XVI and Queen Marie Antoinette.

== Career ==
During the Ancien Régime, he spent his career in the French Guard regiment, which was always under the command of the Maison militaire du roi de France: 2nd ensign on May 30, 1751, 1st ensign on March 13, 1755, second lieutenant on February 15, 1761, lieutenant on September 6, 1767, colonel on May 9, 1771, and adjutant major on March 8, 1772. On May 27, 1781, he was captain of the Prince of Condé's guards and had the honor of fighting him in a duel over an offense concerning a woman they both loved. This affair cost him the prince's favor until his exile to England at the end of 1812. Fortunately, it did not prevent him from advancing in his career: on January 1, 1784, he was made brigadier of the fields and armies, and on November 7, 1785, colonel of infantry.

On March 9, 1788, he was promoted to field marshal and marshal of the king's armies. On May 6 of the same year, under the orders of Marshal de Biron, he was commissioned to arrest the councillors Duval d'Eprémesnil and Goislard de Montsabert, the leaders of the Fronde who did not respect the principles of royal absolutism. It was with exaggeration that Director Barras later wrote in his memoirs that he had behaved in this circumstance “with the dignity of a knight of the maréchaussée”. On October 5, 1788, he was called upon to succeed the Marquis de Sauzay as major general of the guard regiment, under the command of the Duke du Châtelet and the Count de Marban. On November 16, 1788, he was appointed governor of Épinal.

=== Storming of the Bastille ===
After the Storming of the Bastille, he resigned and served on the general staff of the army of the Three Bishoprics, where he was responsible for transportation issues. He was a soldier of the Duke of Choiseul, colonel of the regiment of royal dragoons still loyal to the king. In April 1791, General Bouillé considered him a man of honor and courage, and proposed him as the most reliable assistant to accompany the king and his family on the journey that ended in Varennes, saying that he was necessary in such circumstances to curb the king's unreliability when under pressure.

=== French Revolution ===
His knowledge of the postal network was a valuable support to Count Fersen, who knew practically nothing about the small world of grooms and postilions. At the last minute, the king was unable to take him aboard the sedan chair because the Marquise de Tourzel joined as governess to the children of France. On August 19, 1791, he was arrested for contemptuous remarks about the France National Guard.

== Later life and death ==
Having emigrated during the disastrous revolution, his property was seized and sold in Year III: his castle at Saint-Michel, located on the lower church square, was auctioned off and divided into several lots. He fought in the 1792 campaign in the army of the princes and was a major in the infantry. He was sent by the princes to the Prussian army. In September 1795, he was proposed in England as governor of the island of Houat, and possibly Belle Isle.

A loyal subject of Louis XVIII until the end, he never saw France or the return of the Maison capétienne de Bourbon again. He died in exile in London on February 19, 1813, without issue.

== Bibliography ==
- Thomas Carlyle's The French Revolution, A History, Book I, chapter viii.

== Medias ==
- Colonel d'Agoult is a character in the manga and anime series The Rose of Versailles, created by Riyoko Ikeda.
