= Insurrection of 10 August 1792 =

Storming of the Tuileries Palace in Paris during the French Revolution

- Part of the French Revolution
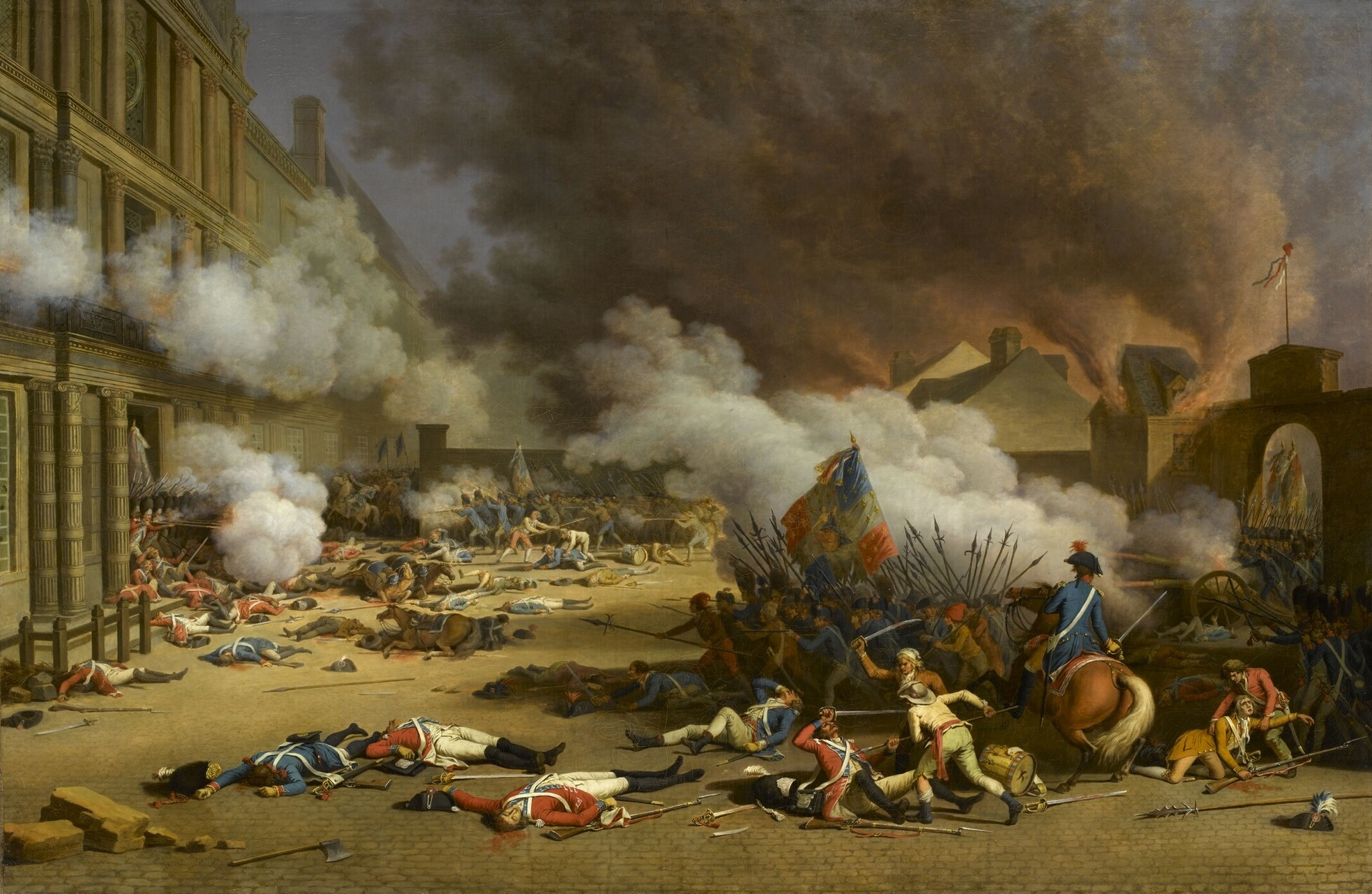
- Capture of the Tuileries Palace, 10 August 1792; Jean Duplessis-Bertaux, 1793
Date	10 August 1792
Location	Paris, France 48°51′44″N 2°19′57″E
Result	Republican victory

Belligerents
Republicans	(Kingdom of France) Royalists

Commanders and leaders
Antoine Joseph Santerre; François Joseph Westermann; Claude Fournier	(Kingdom of France) Louis XVI (surrendered) (Kingdom of France) Augustin-Joseph de Mailly (Kingdom of France) Karl Josef von Bachmann

Strength
~20,000	(Kingdom of France) ~1,200

Casualties and losses
~200–400 killed	(Kingdom of France) ~300–600 killed 200 captured
- Location within present-day Paris, France Insurrection of 10 August 1792 (France) Insurrection of 10 August 1792 (Europe)

The insurrection of 10 August 1792, also known as the Storming of the Tuileries, was a defining event of the French Revolution, when armed revolutionaries in Paris, increasingly in conflict with the French monarchy, stormed the Tuileries Palace. The conflict led France to abolish the monarchy and establish a republic.

Conflict between King Louis XVI and the country's new revolutionary Legislative Assembly increased through the spring and summer of 1792 as Louis vetoed radical measures voted upon by the Assembly. Tensions accelerated dramatically on 1 August when news reached Paris that the commander of the allied Prussian and Austrian armies had issued the Brunswick Manifesto, threatening "unforgettable vengeance" on Paris should harm be done to the French royal family.

On 10 August, the National Guard of the Paris Commune and fédérés from Marseille and Brittany stormed the King's residence in the Tuileries Palace in Paris, which was defended by the Swiss Guards. Hundreds of Swiss guardsmen and 400 revolutionaries were killed in the battle, and Louis and the royal family took shelter with the Legislative Assembly. The formal end of the monarchy occurred six weeks later on 21 September as one of the first acts of the new National Convention, which established a republic on the next day.

The insurrection and its outcomes are most commonly referred to by historians of the Revolution simply as "the 10 August"; other common designations include "the day of the 10 August" or "the Second Revolution".

== Background ==
On 20 April 1792, the Kingdom of France declared war on Austria. The initial battles were a disaster for the French Royal Army, which had been weakened by mutinies, the emigration of officers and political change. Prussia subsequently allied with Austria before declaring war on France on 13 June. The blame for these opening setbacks was put upon the King and his ministers (the Austrian Committee), and after upon the Girondin party.

The Legislative Assembly passed decrees sentencing any priest denounced by twenty citizens to immediate deportation (27 May), dissolving the King's Constitutional Guard, incorrectly alleging that it was manned by aristocrats (29 May), and establishing in the vicinity of Paris a camp of 20,000 fédérés (8 June). The King vetoed the decrees and dismissed Girondists from the Ministry. When the King formed a new cabinet mostly of constitutional monarchists (Feuillants), this widened the breach between the King and the Assembly and the majority of the common people of Paris. These events happened on 16 June when Lafayette sent a letter to the Assembly, recommending suppression of "anarchists" and political clubs in the capital.

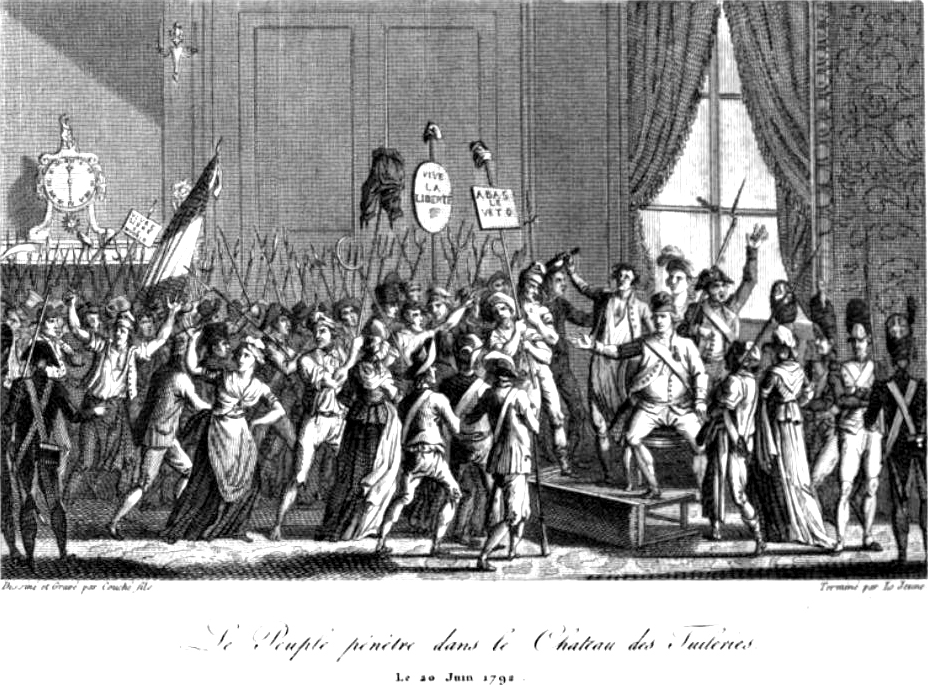
Journée of 20 June 1792

Six days later the Assembly declared la patrie est en danger (the homeland is in danger). Banners were placed in the public squares, with the words:

Would you allow foreign hordes to spread like a destroying torrent over your countryside! That they ravage our harvest! That they devastate our fatherland through fire and murder! In a word, that they overcome you with chains dyed with the blood of those whom you hold the most dear... Citizens, the country is in danger!

== Insurrectionism ==
The ruling spirit of this new revolution was Georges Jacques Danton, a barrister only thirty-two years old, who had not sat in either Assembly, although he had been the leader of the republican Cordeliers (Society of the Friends of the Rights of Man and of the Citizen), which was popular in Paris. Danton and his friends and allies—Maximilien Robespierre, Camille Desmoulins, Fabre d'Églantine, Jean-Paul Marat, etc.—were assisted in their work by the fear of invasion.

Volunteers and fédérés were constantly arriving in Paris, and, although most went on to join the army, the Jacobin clubs enlisted those who were suitable for their purpose, especially some 500 whom Charles Jean Marie Barbaroux, a Girondin, had summoned from Marseille. François Mignet writes, "Their enterprise had been projected and suspended several times. On 26 July, an insurrection was to break out; but it was badly contrived, and Pétion prevented it. When the federates from Marseille arrived, on their way to the camp at Soissons, the faubourgs were to meet them, and then repair, unexpectedly, to the château. This insurrection also failed." It was resolved to strike the decisive blow on 10 August.

The political clubs openly discussed the dethronement of the king, and on 3 August Jérôme Pétion de Villeneuve spoke to the Assembly, soliciting an end to the monarchy in the name of the commune and of the sections. On 8 August, the accusation of Lafayette was discussed; he was acquitted; but (again quoting Mignet), "all who had voted for him were hissed, pursued, and ill treated by the people at the breaking up of the sitting"., as for example the comte de Vaublanc or Quatremère de Quincy. This harassment extended to death threats and invasions of their homes. Hector de Joly, the minister of justice wrote to the president of the Assembly, "I have denounced these attacks in the criminal court; but law is powerless; and I am impelled by honour and probity to inform you, that without the promptest assistance of the legislative body, the government can no longer be responsible."

== The insurrection ==
The populace were unwilling to wait on the result of Pétion's attempts to pursue matters through legislative channels. The section of the Quinze-vingts declared on 8 August that, if the dethronement were not pronounced that very day, at midnight they would sound the tocsin and attack the royal residence at the Tuileries. Of the forty-eight sections of Paris, all but one dissented. Pétion informed the Legislative Assembly that the sections had "resumed their sovereignty" and that he had no power over the people other than that of persuasion.

On the night of 9 August a new revolutionary Paris Commune took possession of the Hôtel de Ville (the seat of city government). The plan of the Jacobins of the Assembly, supported by the armed fédérés, was to dissolve the département of Paris, to dismiss Pétion, and to institute an insurrectionary commune (municipal government), then to assault the Tuileries.

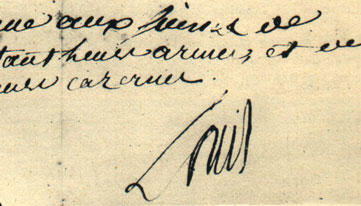
Louis XVI's order to surrender

Louis, hearing from the manége the sound of firing, wrote on a scrap of paper: "The King orders the Swiss to lay down their arms at once, and to retire to their barracks." To obey this order in the midst of heavy fighting meant almost certain death and the Swiss officers in command did not immediately act upon it. However, the position of the Swiss Guard soon became untenable as their ammunition ran low and casualties mounted. The King's note was then produced and the defenders were ordered to disengage.

The main body of Swiss Guards fell back through the palace and retreated under fire through the Tuileries Garden at the rear of the building. They were brought to a halt near the central Round Pond, broken into smaller groups and slaughtered. Some sought sanctuary in the Parliament House: about sixty were surrounded, taken as prisoners to the Hôtel de Ville, and put to death by the crowd there, beneath the statue of Louis XIV.

The victims of the massacre included some of the male courtiers and members of the palace staff, although being less conspicuous than the red-coated Swiss Guards, others were able to escape. No female members of the court seem to have been killed during the massacre. According to Jeanne-Louise-Henriette Campan, after the royal family left the palace only in the company of Princess de Lamballe and Madame de Tourzel, the remaining ladies-in-waiting were gathered in a room in the queen's apartment, and when they were spotted, a man prevented an attack upon them by exclaiming, in the name of Pétion: "Spare the women! Don't disgrace the nation!"

As the queen's entire household was gathered in her apartment, this may have included female servants. Campan mentioned two maids outside of this room, neither of whom was killed despite a male member of the staff being murdered beside them. The ladies-in-waiting were, according to Campan, "escorted to prison."

This is more or less confirmed in the memoirs of Pauline de Tourzel, who states that when the mob entered the chamber where the ladies-in-waiting were gathered, the Princesse de Tarente approached one of the rebels and asked for his protection for her colleagues Madame de Ginestous and Pauline de Tourzel, upon which he replied: "We do not fight with women; go, all of you, if you choose". Following this example, the rest of the ladies-in-waiting departed the palace in about the same way, and all passed safely out.

The total losses on the King's side were perhaps eight hundred. Out of the nine hundred Swiss on duty at the palace, only about three hundred survived the fighting, and of these an estimated two hundred either died of their wounds in prison or during the September Massacres that followed. A further three hundred Swiss Guards had been sent to Normandy to escort grain convoys a few days before 10 August and escaped the massacre. The commander of all Swiss mercenaries in French service, Louis-Auguste-Augustin d'Affry, who had been absent on 10 August due to illness, reported on 12 November that about 300 Swiss guardsmen had been killed at the Tuileries.

== Aftermath ==
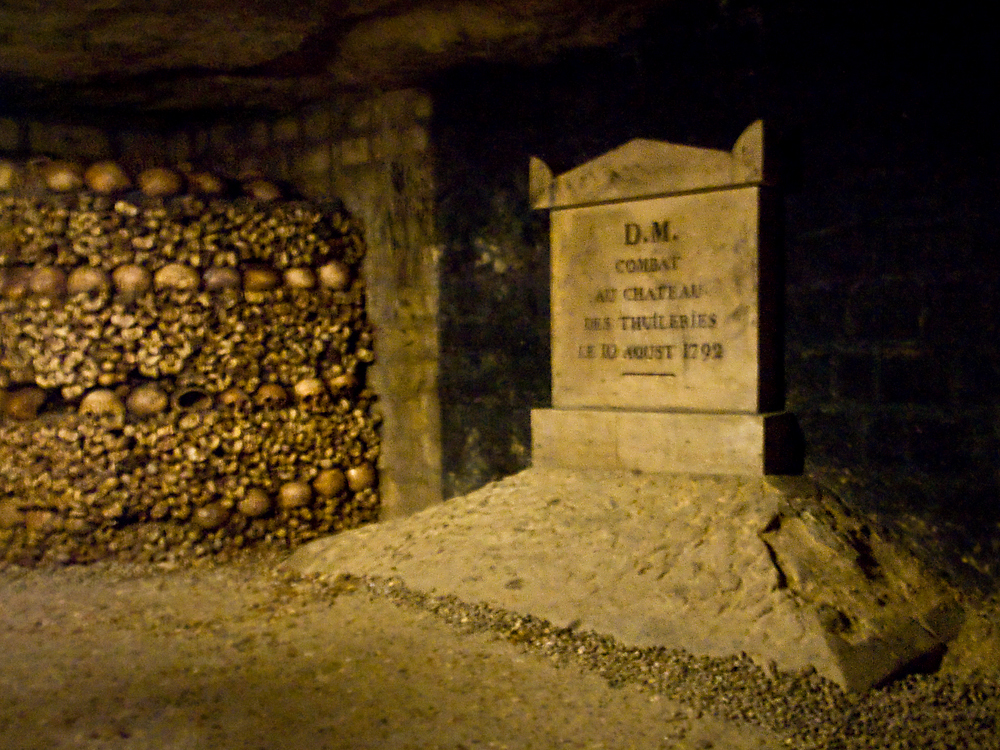
A plaque commemorating the 10 August 1792 assault on the Tuileries, in the Catacombs of Paris where many of those killed have been buried.

On 26 August, in the presence of almost half the population of Paris, a funeral ceremony was held in the Tuileries Garden for the victims killed during the insurrection. Among the Swiss Guards who survived the insurrection, up to 350 later enlisted in the Revolutionary Army of the French First Republic. Others joined the counter-revolutionaries in the War in the Vendée. In 1817, the Swiss Federal Diet awarded 389 of the survivors the commemorative medal Treue und Ehre (Loyalty and Honor).

== Sources ==
- Hampson, Norman (1988). A Social History of the French Revolution. Routledge: University of Toronto Press. ISBN 0-710-06525-6.
- Kropotkin, Peter (1929). The Great French Revolution 1789–1793. Vol. I. New York: Vanguard Press. OL 5222400M.
- Lefebvre, Georges (1962). The French Revolution: From Its Origins to 1793. Vol. I. New York: Columbia University Press. ISBN 0-231-08599-0.
- Madelin, Louis (1926). The French Revolution. London: William Heinemann Ltd.
- Mathiez, Albert (1929). The French Revolution. New York: Alfred A. Knopf.
- McPhee, Peter (2002). The French Revolution 1789–1799. Oxford: Oxford University Press. ISBN 0-199-24414-6.
- Mignet, François (1824). History of the French Revolution from 1789 to 1814. Project Gutenberg eBook.
- Pfeiffer, L. B. (1913). The Uprising of June 20, 1792. Lincoln: New Era Printing Company.
- Rude, George (1972). The Crowd in the French Revolution. Oxford: Oxford University Press.
- Soboul, Albert (1974). The French Revolution: 1787–1799. New York: Random House. ISBN 0-394-47392-2.
- Taine, Hippolyte (2011). The Origins of Contemporary France, Volume 3. Project Gutenberg eBook.
- Thompson, J. M. (1959). The French Revolution. Oxford: Basil Blackwell.
