= Basel–Rodersdorf railway line =

Railway line in France and Switzerland

Basel–Rodersdorf
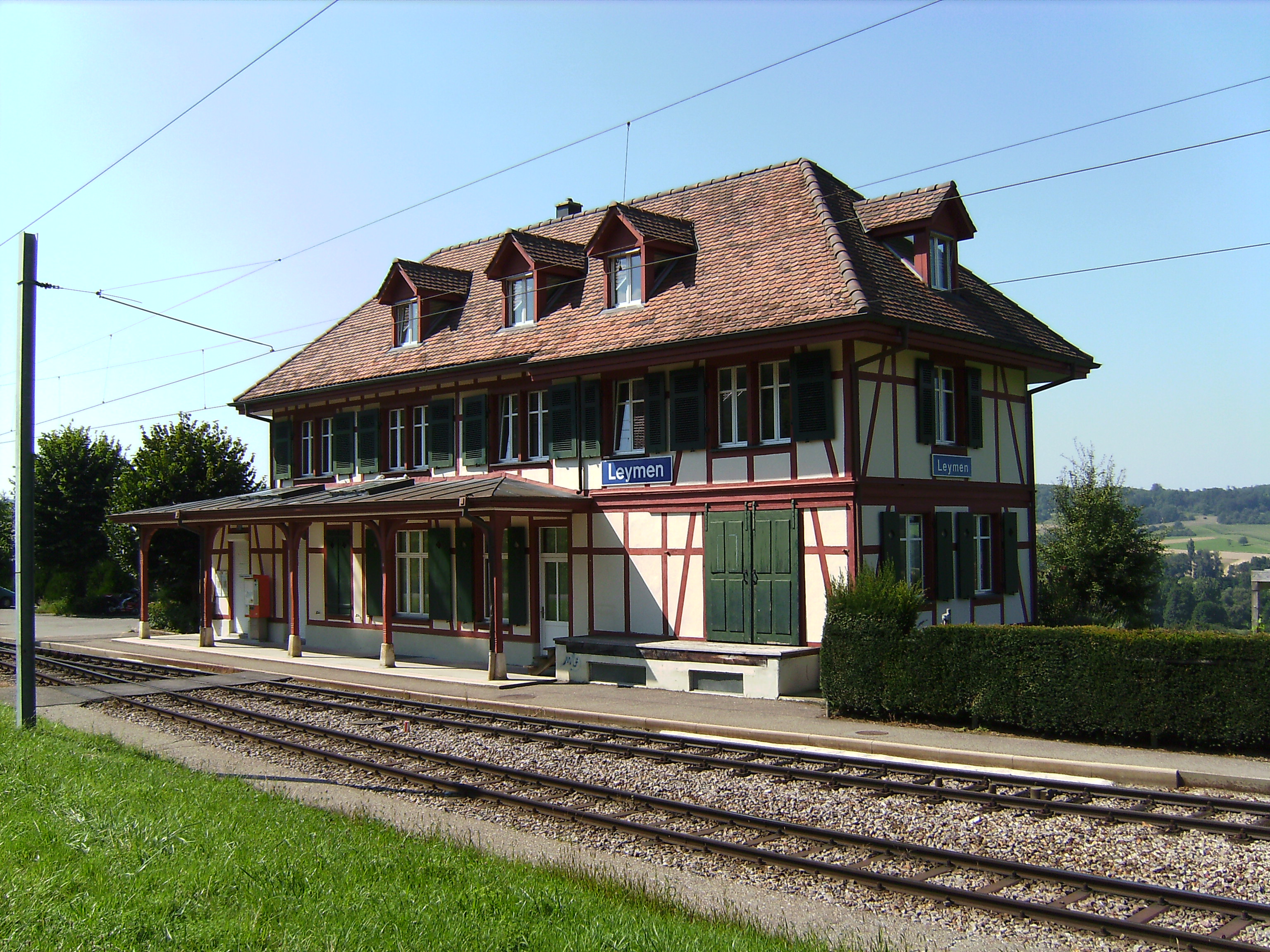
- The Leyman station building in 2007

Overview
- Owner: Baselland Transport

Service
- Services: 10, 17

History
- Opened: 4 October 1887

Technical
- Line length: 16.2 km (10.1 mi)
- Track gauge: 1,000 mm (3 ft 3 3/8 in) metre gauge
- Electrification: 600 V DC

The Basel–Rodersdorf railway line is a 1,000 mm (3 ft 3 3/8 in) railway line in Switzerland and France. It runs 16.2 kilometres (10.1 mi) from Rodersdorf, in the Swiss canton of Solothurn, to the border of Basel-Stadt, near the Basel Zoo, where it connects with the Basel tram network. The line crosses through the southern part of the French department of Haut-Rhin, serving the commune of Leymen. The line was built by the Birsigthalbahn-Gesellschaft in stages between 1887 and 1902 as a conventional steam-hauled line. It was later electrified, and is now owned by Baselland Transport, which operates lines 10 and 17 of the Basel tram network over the line.

== History ==
The Birsigthalbahn-Gesellschaft, founded in 1886, opened its initial line between Basel and Therwil on 4 October 1887. The line was roughly 7 kilometres (4.3 mi) long and worked by steam locomotives. The line was extended another 5.6 kilometres (3.5 mi) to Flüh, on the border with Alsace (then part of the German Empire). The line between Basel and Flüh was electrified at 750 V DC on 2 June 1905; this was later raised to 940 V DC. A final 3.8-kilometre (2.4 mi) extension to Rodersdorf, crossing Alsace, opened on 1 May 1910.

Operation beyond Flüh was suspended between 1914 and 1915 by the outbreak of World War I. The postwar Treaty of Versailles restored Alsace to France. World War II and the German invasion of France led to the closure of the line a second time, between 1940 and 1945. As of 2022, cross-border operation continues and Alsace remains part of France.

In 1974, the Birsigthalbahn-Gesellschaft merged with three other companies to form Baselland Transport. In 1984, the line's electrification was converted to 600 V DC to permit interoperation with the rest of the Basel tram network.

== Route ==
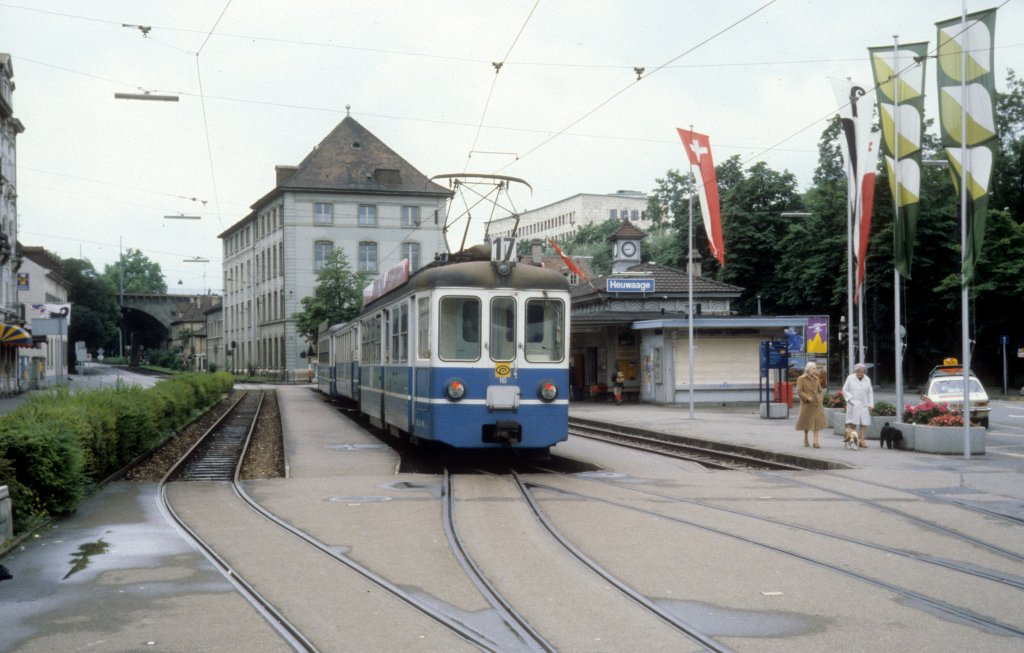
The former terminus at Basel Heuwaage in 1980, prior to the line's conversion to tram operation

The line begins from a turning loop in Rodersdorf. It then runs east through Haut-Rhin, in Alsace, serving the commune of Leymen. Crossing back into Switzerland, it serves the municipalities of Bättwil, Witterswil, and Ettingen, and then turns north to follow the Birsig river. It serves the municipalities of Therwil, Oberwil, Bottmingen, and Binningen. The line then enters the city of Basel and serves the Basel Zoo, after which it connects with the Basel tram network.

== Operation ==
Baselland Transport operates two tram services over the line, Lines 10 and 17. Line 10 originates in Dornach-Arlesheim, on the Basel–Dornach railway line. Two trams operate every fifteen minutes to Ettingen via Basel SBB. Every other tram continues beyond Ettingen to Flüh or Rodersdorf. Line 17 provides additional week-day rush-hour service from Basel Wiesenplatz to Ettingen.
