= Basel Dreispitz railway station =

Railway station in Switzerland

Basel Dreispitz
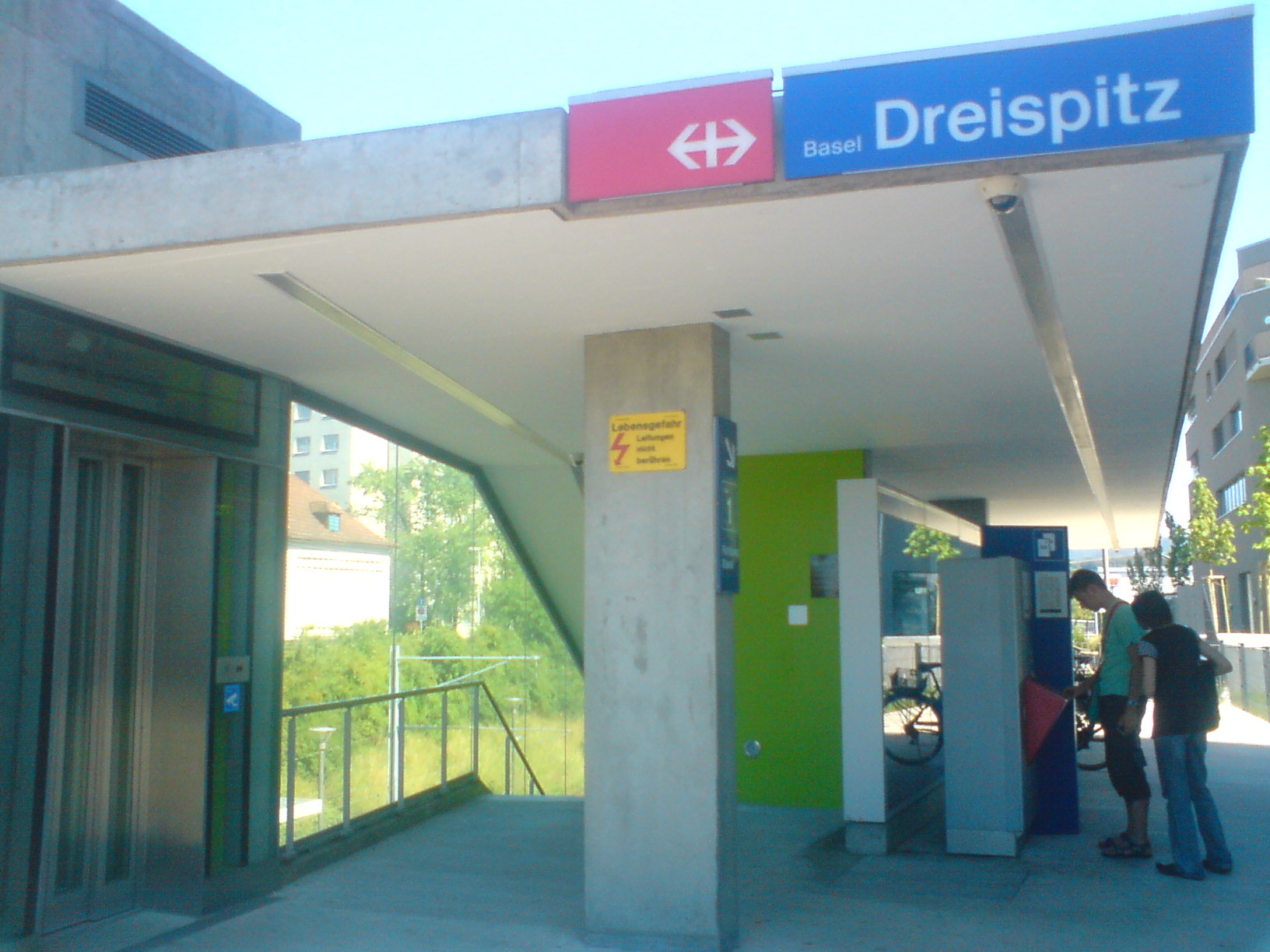
- The street-level entrance in 2009

General information
- Location: Basel; Switzerland
- Coordinates: 47°32′17″N 7°36′32″E
- Owner: Swiss Federal Railways
- Line: Basel–Biel/Bienne line
- Train operators: Swiss Federal Railways
- Connections: Trams: 10, 11

History
- Opened: 24 May 2006

Services
Preceding station	Basel S-Bahn	Following station
Münchenstein towards Delémont	S3	Basel SBB towards Olten
Münchenstein towards Laufen	S31	Basel SBB Terminus
Location
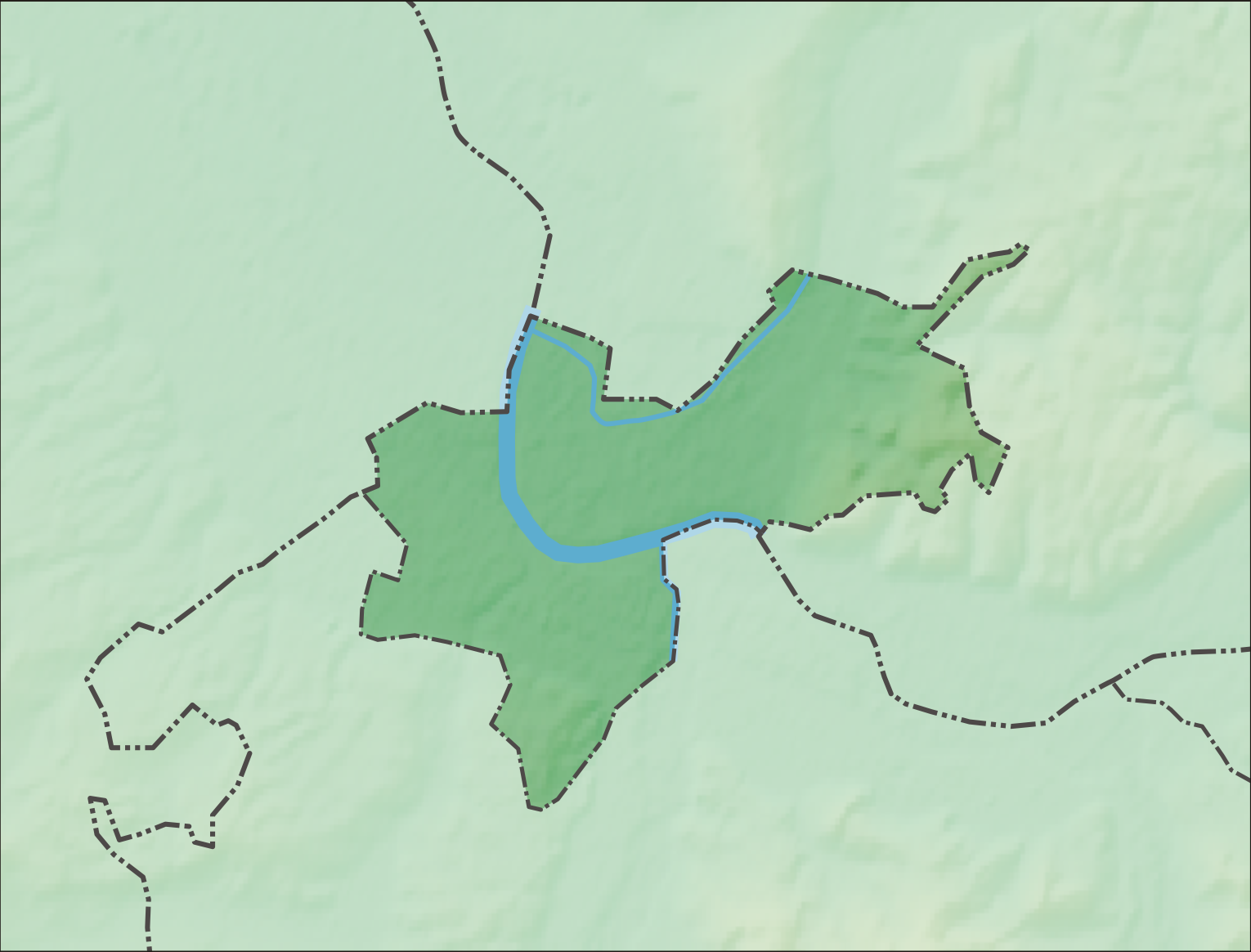
- Location within Switzerland Location within Canton of Basel-Stadt

Basel Dreispitz railway station (German: Bahnhof Basel Dreispitz) is a railway station in the city of Basel, in the Swiss canton of Basel-Stadt. It is an intermediate stop on the Basel–Biel/Bienne line and is served by local trains only. The station was built in 2005 despite numerous objections from local residents and was opened in May 2006. In 2008 the station was awarded a Brunel Award by the Watford Group. It offers transfer possibilities on tram lines of Baselland Transport as well as bus lines of the same company and the Basler Verkehrs-Betriebe.

The suburban tram lines 10 and 11 of Baselland Transport stop on Münchensteinerstrasse, just west of the station building. South of Basel Dreispitz, the two lines leave the Basel tram network and move on to the 1,000 mm (3 ft 3 3/8 in) Basel–Dornach and Basel–Aesch railway lines.

== Services ==
As of the December 2025 timetable change, the following services stop at Basel Dreispitz:

- Basel S-Bahn /: half-hourly service between Olten and Laufen with additional peak-hour service to Basel SBB and two trains per day to Delémont.
