= Münchenstein railway station =

Railway station in Germany

Münchenstein
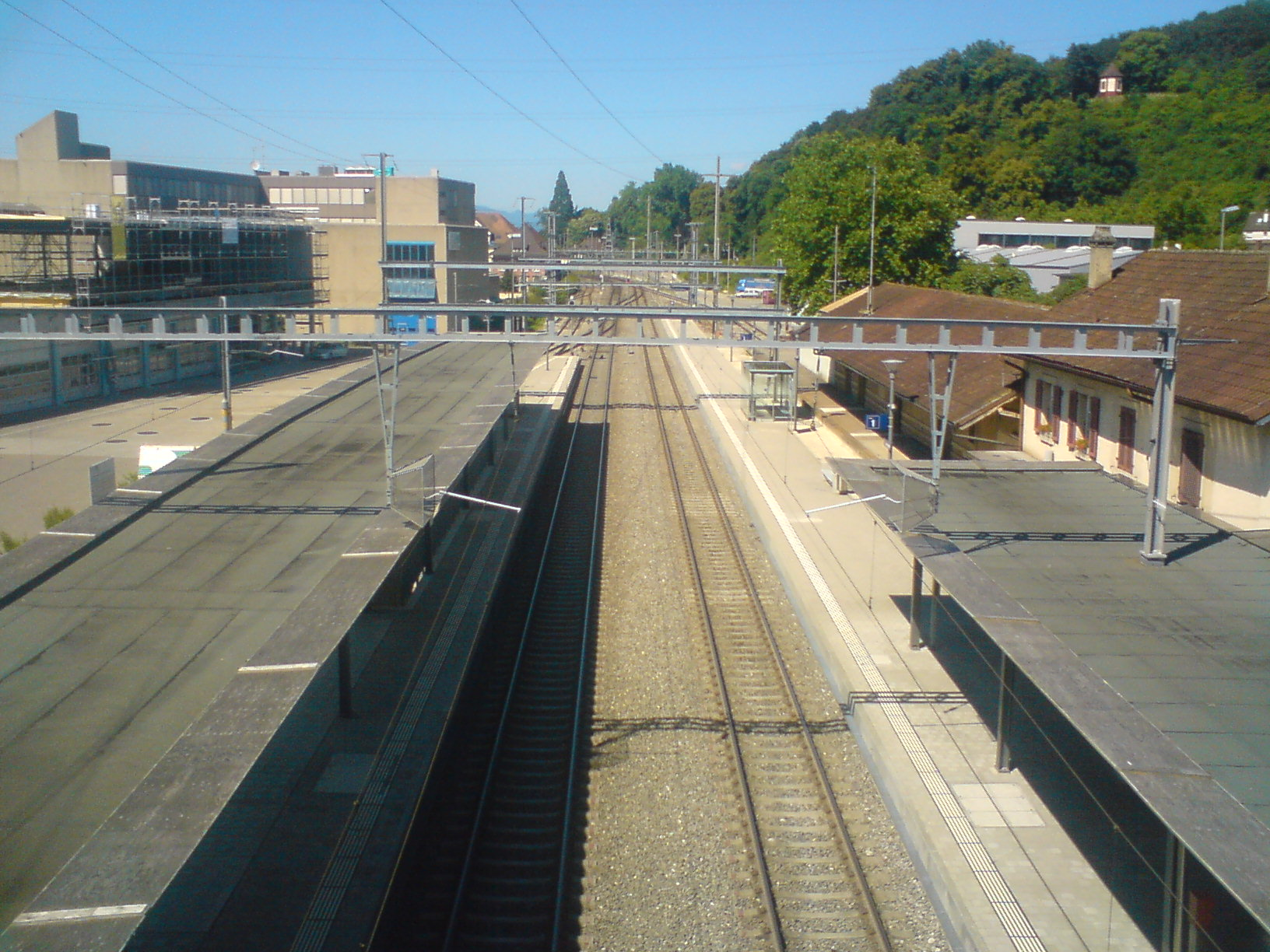
- The station in 2009

General information
- Location: Münchenstein; Switzerland
- Coordinates: 47°30′47.66″N 7°37′2.17″E
- Owner: Swiss Federal Railways
- Line: Basel–Biel/Bienne line
- Train operators: Swiss Federal Railways
- Connections: Trams: 10

Services
Preceding station	Basel S-Bahn	Following station
Dornach-Arlesheim towards Delémont	S3	Basel Dreispitz towards Olten
Dornach-Arlesheim towards Laufen	S31	Basel Dreispitz towards Basel SBB
Location
- Location within Switzerland

Münchenstein railway station (German: Bahnhof Münchenstein) is a railway station in the municipality of Münchenstein, in the Swiss canton of Basel-Landschaft. It is an intermediate stop on the Basel–Biel/Bienne line and is served by local trains only.

The 1,000 mm (3 ft 3 3/8 in) Basel–Dornach railway line runs parallel to the Basel–Biel/Bienne line, approximately 300 metres (980 ft) to the east. Connection is available to Line 10 of the Basel tram network, which uses the line between Dornach and Basel.

== Services ==
As of the December 2025 timetable change, the following services stop at Münchenstein:

- Basel S-Bahn /: half-hourly service between Olten and Laufen with additional peak-hour service to Basel SBB and two trains per day to Delémont.
