= Basel–Pratteln railway line =

Railway line in Switzerland

Basel–Pratteln
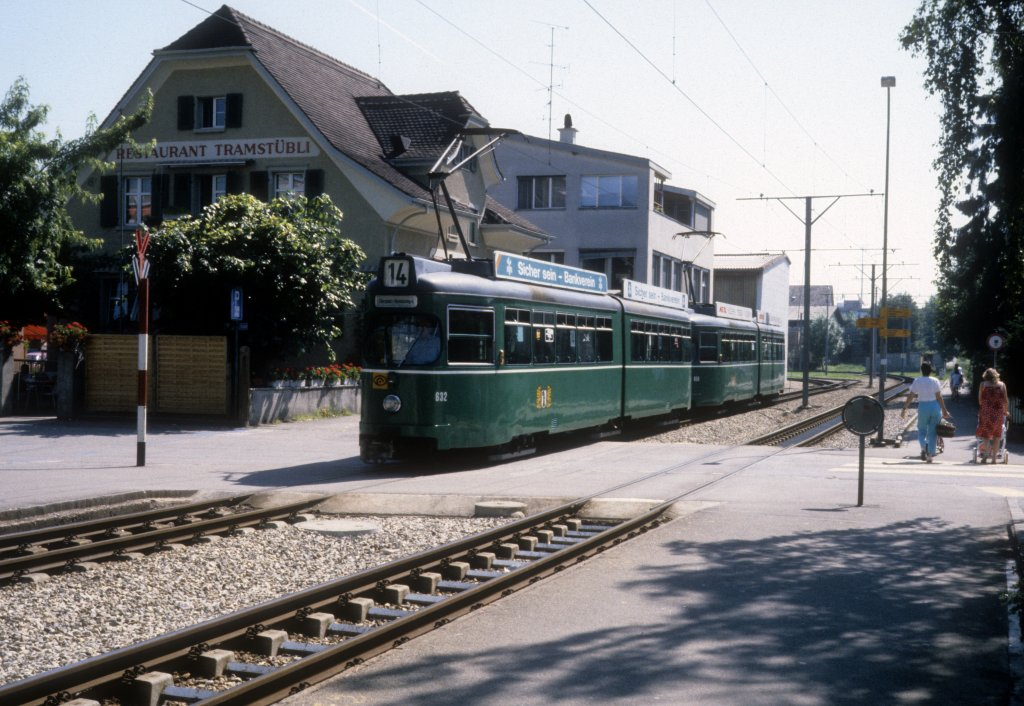
- A BVB tram crosses the Schlossstrasse in 1987, near the terminus in Pratteln

Overview
- Owner: Baselland Transport

Service
- Services: 14
- Operator(s): Basler Verkehrs-Betriebe

History
- Opened: 22 January 1921

Technical
- Line length: 6.2 km (3.9 mi)
- Track gauge: 1,000 mm (3 ft 3 3/8 in) metre gauge
- Electrification: 600 V DC

The Basel–Pratteln railway line is a 1,000 mm (3 ft 3 3/8 in) railway line in Switzerland. It runs 6.2 kilometres (3.9 mi) from Pratteln to the border of Basel-Stadt, across the river Birs from St. Jakob-Park, where it connects with the Basel tram network. The line was built by the Basellandschaftliche Ueberlandbahn in 1921 and is now owned by Baselland Transport. Basler Verkehrs-Betriebe operates line 14 of the Basel tram network over the line.

== History ==
The Basellandschaftliche Ueberlandbahn opened a line from the existing tram network at Schänzli, on the river Birs, to Muttenz, on 22 January 1921. Trains continued over the Basel tram network and terminated at Aeschenplatz. The line was further extended to its present terminus in Pratteln, near the Swiss Federal Railways station there, on 20 October 1922. The line was electrified from opening at 550 V DC, later increased to 600 V DC. A planned extension from Pratteln to Liestal was never built. In 1974, the Basellandschaftliche Ueberlandbahn merged with three other companies to form Baselland Transport. A 3.2-kilometre (2.0 mi) proposed extension northeast to the Salina Raurica area was rejected by voters in 2021.

== Route ==
The line begins from a turning loop 160 metres (520 ft) south of the Swiss Federal Railways station at Pratteln. It runs east-west, roughly parallel to the standard gauge Hauenstein Railway, and runs through the municipalities of Pratteln and Muttenz. The line is double-tracked, running at-grade on dedicated right-of-way. It crosses the river Birs near St. Jakob-Park, where it connects with the Basel tram network.

== Operation ==
Basler Verkehrs-Betriebe operates line 14 of the Basel tram network over the line. Trams operate at frequent intervals from Pratteln via Aeschenplatz to Dreirosenbrücke, on the north side of Basel.
