= Basel–Aesch railway line =

Railway line in Switzerland

Basel–Aesch
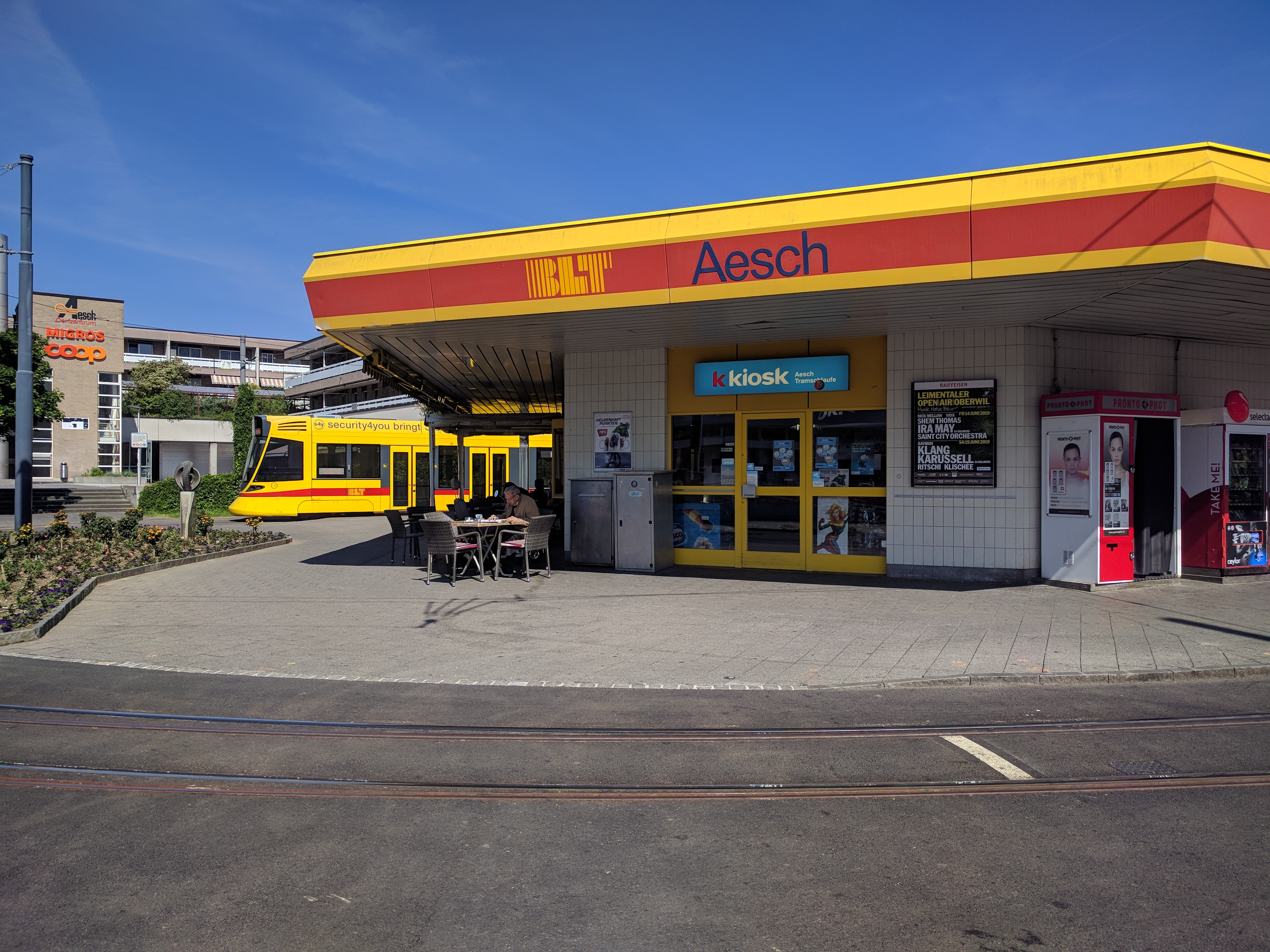
- The loop in Aesch, at the southern end of the line

Overview
- Owner: Baselland Transport

Service
- Services: Trams in Basel: 11, E11

History
- Opened: 7 December 1907

Technical
- Track gauge: 1,000 mm (3 ft 3 3/8 in) metre gauge
- Electrification: 600 V DC

The Basel–Aesch railway line is a 1,000 mm (3 ft 3 3/8 in) railway line in Switzerland. It runs 8.2 kilometres (5.1 mi) from Aesch to the border of Basel-Stadt, near Basel Dreispitz, where it connects with the Basel tram network. The line was built by the Trambahn Basel-Aesch in 1907 and is now owned by Baselland Transport, which operates Line 11 of the Basel tram network over the line.

== History ==
Trambahn Basel-Aesch opened a line between Ruchfeld, in Basel, and Aesch, on 7 December 1907. Trains continued over the Basel tram network and terminated at Aeschenplatz. The line was electrified from opening at 550 V DC, later increased to 600 V DC. In 1974, Trambahn Basel-Aesch merged with three other companies to form Baselland Transport, which continues to own and operate the line.

== Route ==
The line begins from a turning loop on the Haupstrasse, in Aesch. The Swiss Federal Railways station at Aesch is on the other side of the Birs river, 700 metres (2,300 ft) to the east. The line runs north-south, through the municipalities of Reinach and Münchenstein. Near Dreispitz, at the northern end of the line, it joins with the Basel–Dornach railway line. The two lines then connect with the tracks of the Basel tram network.

== Operation ==
Baselland Transport operates the line as a tramway, designated as Line 11 of the Basel tram network. Two trams operate every fifteen minutes from Aesch to Saint-Louis via Basel SBB. This is supplemented by the E11 line, which provides weekday rush-hour service to and from Reinach and the Basel city center.
