= Dornach-Arlesheim railway station =

Railway station in Switzerland

Dornach-Arlesheim
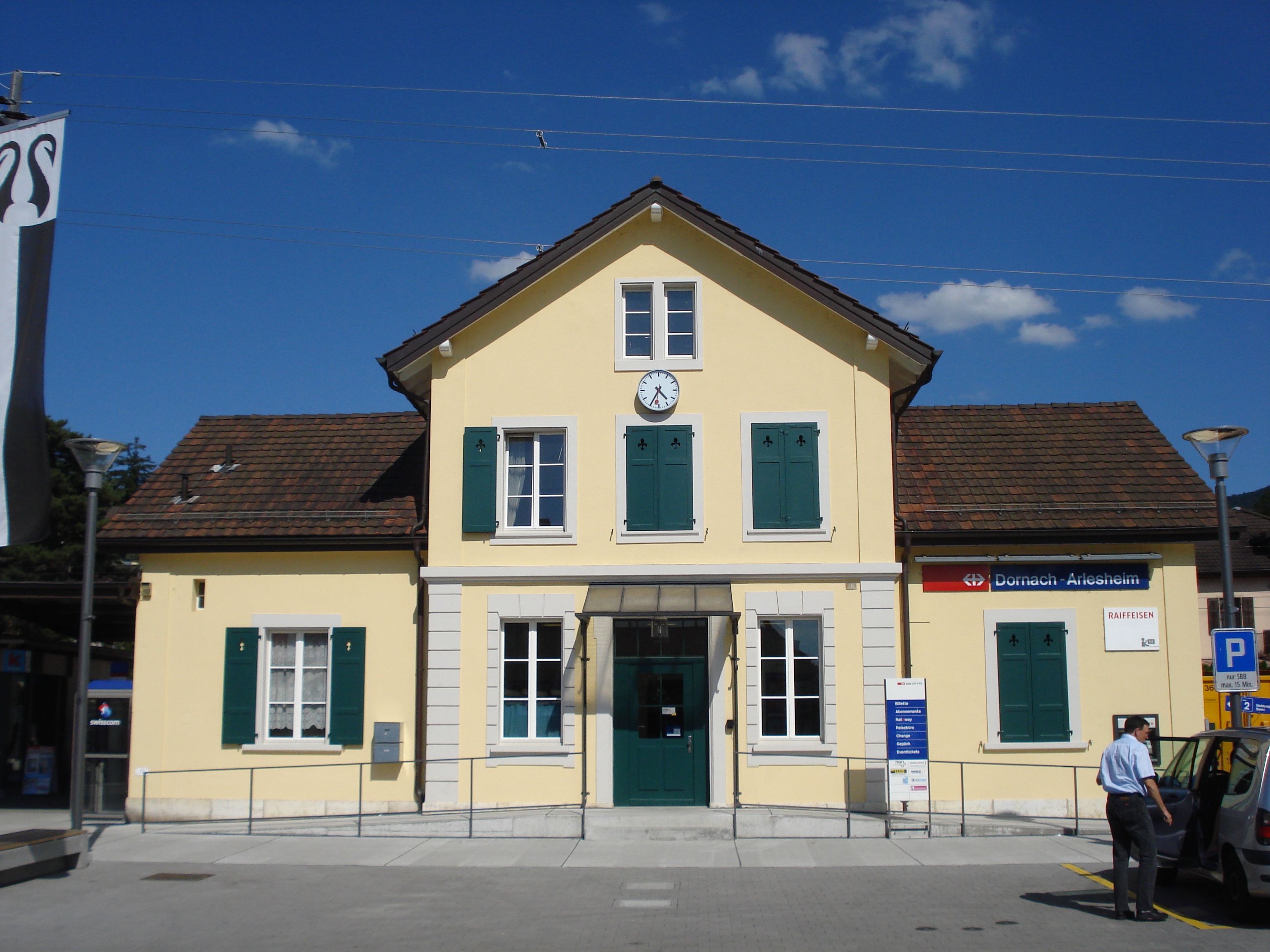
- The station building in 2010

General information
- Location: Arlesheim; Switzerland
- Coordinates: 47°29′19.07″N 7°36′40.39″E
- Owner: Swiss Federal Railways
- Line: Basel–Biel/Bienne line
- Train operators: Swiss Federal Railways
- Connections: Trams: 10

Services
Preceding station	Basel S-Bahn	Following station
Aesch towards Delémont	S3	Münchenstein towards Olten
Aesch towards Laufen	S31	Münchenstein towards Basel SBB
Location
- Location within Switzerland

Dornach-Arlesheim railway station (German: Bahnhof Dornach-Arlesheim) is a railway station in the municipality of Arlesheim, in the Swiss canton of Basel-Landschaft. It is an intermediate stop on the Basel–Biel/Bienne line and is served by local trains only. The station is located just north of the border with the Canton of Solothurn and the municipality of Dornach.

The 1,000 mm (3 ft 3 3/8 in) Basel–Dornach railway line terminates in the station forecourt. Connection is available to Line 10 of the Basel tram network, which uses the line between Dornach and Basel.

== Services ==
As of the December 2025 timetable change, the following services stop at Dornach-Arlesheim:

- Basel S-Bahn /: half-hourly service between Olten and Laufen with additional peak-hour service to Basel SBB and two trains per day to Delémont.
