= Basel–Dornach railway line =

Railway line in Switzerland

Basel–Dornach
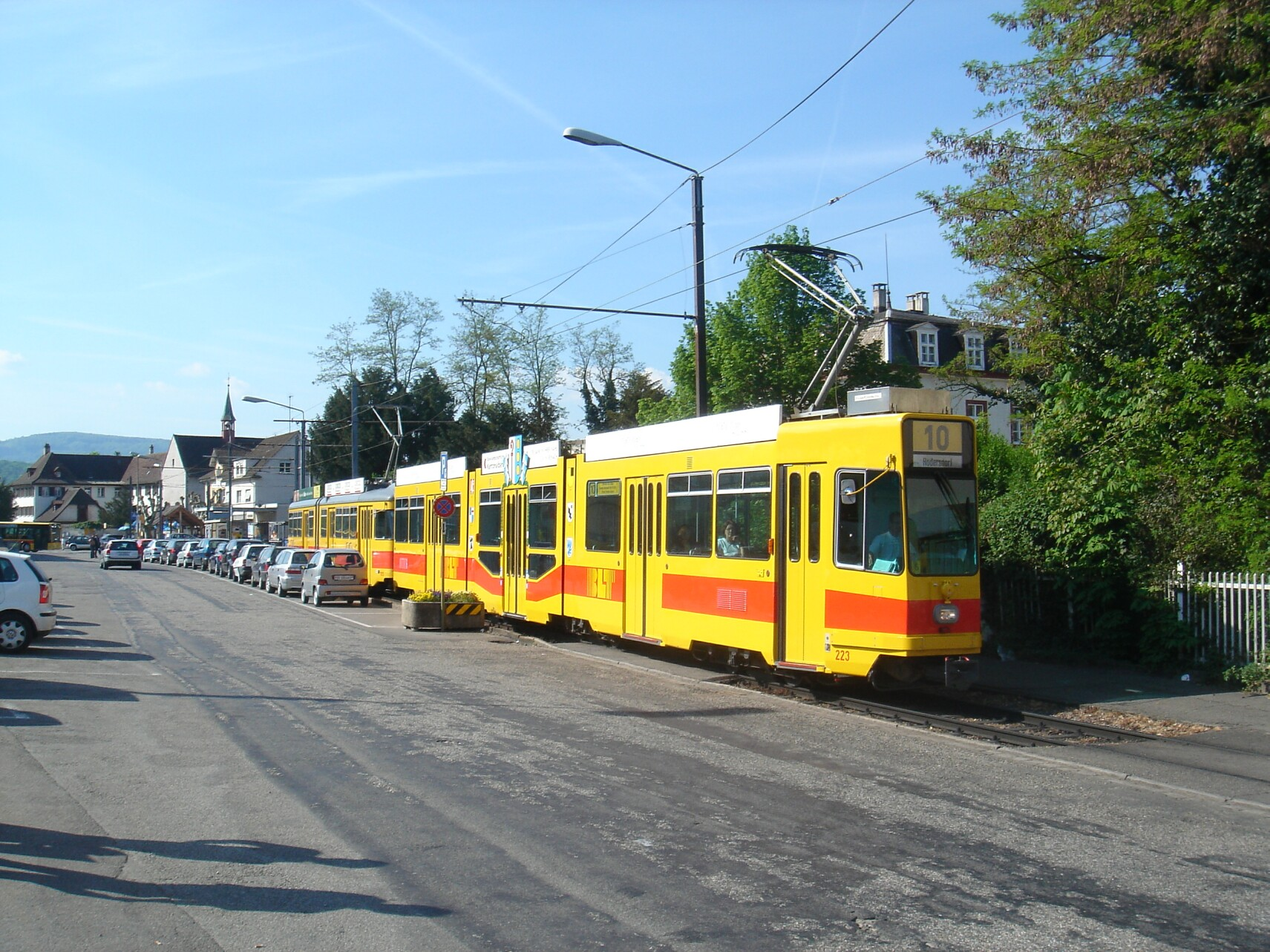

Overview
- Owner: Baselland Transport

Service
- Services: 10

History
- Opened: 6 October 1902

Technical
- Line length: 6.2 km (3.9 mi)
- Track gauge: 1,000 mm (3 ft 3 3/8 in) metre gauge
- Electrification: 600 V DC

The Basel–Dornach railway line is a 1,000 mm (3 ft 3 3/8 in) railway line in Switzerland. It runs 6.2 kilometres (3.9 mi) from Dornach-Arlesheim to the border of Basel-Stadt, near Basel Dreispitz, where it connects with the Basel tram network. The line was built by the Birseckbahn in 1902 and is now owned by Baselland Transport, which operates Line 10 of the Basel tram network over the line.

== History ==
The Birseckbahn opened a line between Dreispitz, in Basel, and Dornach, on 6 October 1902. Trains continued over the Basel tram network and terminated at Aeschenplatz. The line was electrified from opening at 550 V DC, later increased to 600 V DC. In 1974, the Birseckbahn merged with three other companies to form Baselland Transport, which continues to own and operate the line.

== Route ==
The line begins from a turning loop to adjacent to the Swiss Federal Railways station at Dornach-Arlesheim in Dornach. It runs north-south, roughly parallel to the standard gauge Basel–Biel/Bienne railway line. Both lines cross the river Birs at Münchenstein. In Dreispitz, at the northern end of the line, the Basel–Dornach railway line crosses over the Basel–Biel/Bienne railway line and joins with the Basel–Aesch railway line The two lines then connect with the tracks of the Basel tram network.

== Operation ==
Baselland Transport operates the line as a tramway, designated as Line 10 of the Basel tram network. Two trams operate every fifteen minutes to Ettingen via Basel SBB. South of Basel, these services continue over the Basel–Rodersdorf railway line. Every other tram continues beyond Ettingen to Hofstetten-Flüh or Rodersdorf.
