= Trolleybuses in Basel =

Basel trolleybus system
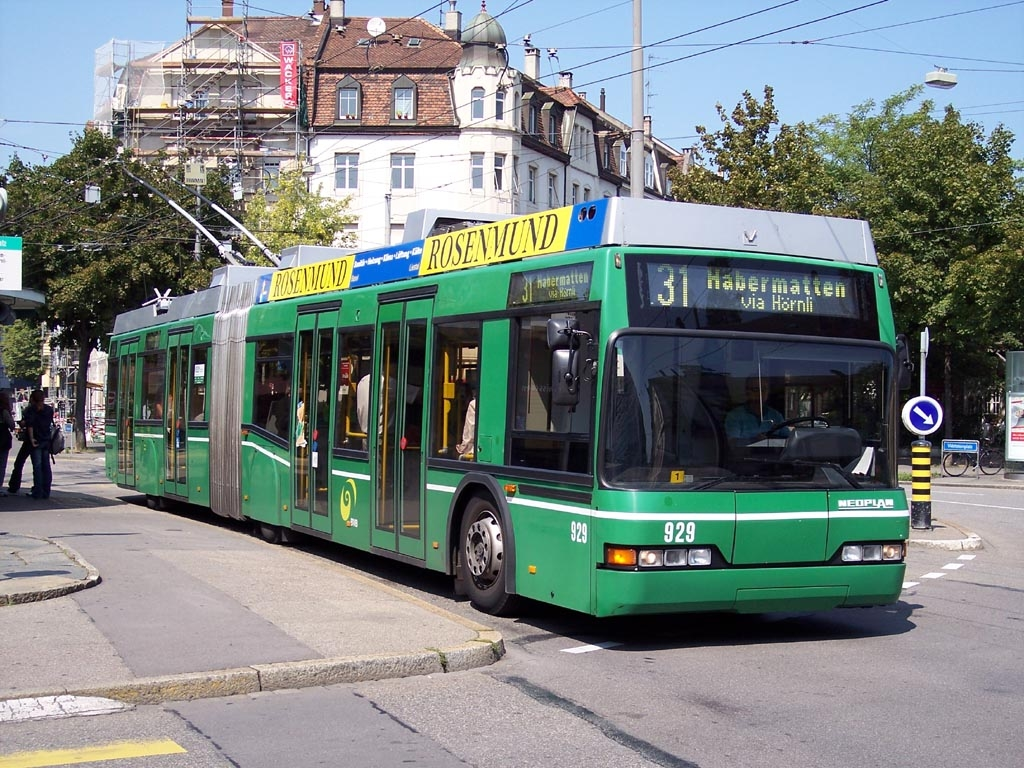
- Basel Neoplan trolleybus no. 929 on line 31, August 2005.

Operation
- Locale: Basel, Switzerland
- Open: 31 July 1941
- Close: 30 June 2008
- Status: Closed
- Routes: 3 (max)
- Operator: Basler Verkehrs-Betriebe (BVB)

Infrastructure
- Electrification: 600 V DC

Statistics
- Website: http://www.bvb.ch Basler Verkehrs-Betriebe (in German)

The Basel trolleybus system (Alemannic German: Trolleybussystem Basel) was part of the public transport network of Basel, Switzerland, for nearly six decades. Opened in 1941, it combined after 1997 with the Basel Regional S-Bahn, the Basel tramway network and Basel's urban motorbus network to form an integrated all-four style scheme until its closure in 2008.

The trolleybus system was operated by Basler Verkehrs-Betriebe (BVB), which also operates Basel's motorbus network and some of the trams on its tramway network. At its height, the trolleybus system consisted of three lines, two of which ran into the neighbouring municipality of Riehen, north of Basel.

== History ==
The individual sections of the Basel trolleybus system went into service as follows:

31 July 1941	Claraplatz–Rosengartenweg–Friedhof am Hörnli	Line A (to 1948); Line 31 (from 1948)	Replacement for motor bus line A
25 October 1948	Friedhof am Hörnli–Habermatten	Line 31	Extension over new section
9 February 1956	Rosengartenweg–Käferholzstrasse	Line 34	Replacement for motor bus line 34
24 October 1968	Wanderstrasse–Badischer Bahnhof	Line 33	Replacement for motor bus line 33 (to 4 July 1966: Tram line 2)
18 April 1973	Käferholzstrasse–Habermatten	Line 34	Extension over new section

Line 34 was converted to motorbus operation on 9 September 2000. A conversion of line 33 followed on 13 December 2004. After the latter closure, Basel's only remaining trolleybus line was the 4.9 km (3.0 mi) long line 31.

A popular initiative to rescue the trolleybuses then occurred, but on 17 June 2007 the initiative was rejected by a 27,403 to 23,645 (53.7%) majority of the voting citizens. Subsequently, the final trolleybus run on line 31 took place on 30 June 2008.

== Fleet ==
A total of 52 trolleybuses were procured for the Basel trolleybus system. All of them were supplied new, apart from nos. 921 and 922, which were acquired second-hand from the Kaiserslautern trolleybus system in Germany:

Manufacturer	Type	Configuration	Quantity	Fleet numbers	Service years
FBW	51	Rigid (two-axle), dual-mode	2	10–11; from 1947 to 1948: 50–51; from 1956: 350–351	1941–1975
Saurer	4 BPO	Two-axle, cab over	2	12–13; from 1947 to 1948: 52–53; from 1956: 352–353	1941–1958
Saurer	4 TP	Two-axle	2	54–55; from 1956: 354–355	1948–1975
FBW	51	Two-axle	12	56–64; from 1956: 356–368	1955–1995
Schindler	APG	Articulated	10	901–910	1968–1996
FBW	91 GTS	Articulated	10	911–920	1975–2000
Daimler-Benz	O305 GT	Articulated	2	921–922	1986–2000
Neoplan	N 6020	Articulated, low-floor	12	923–934	1992–2008

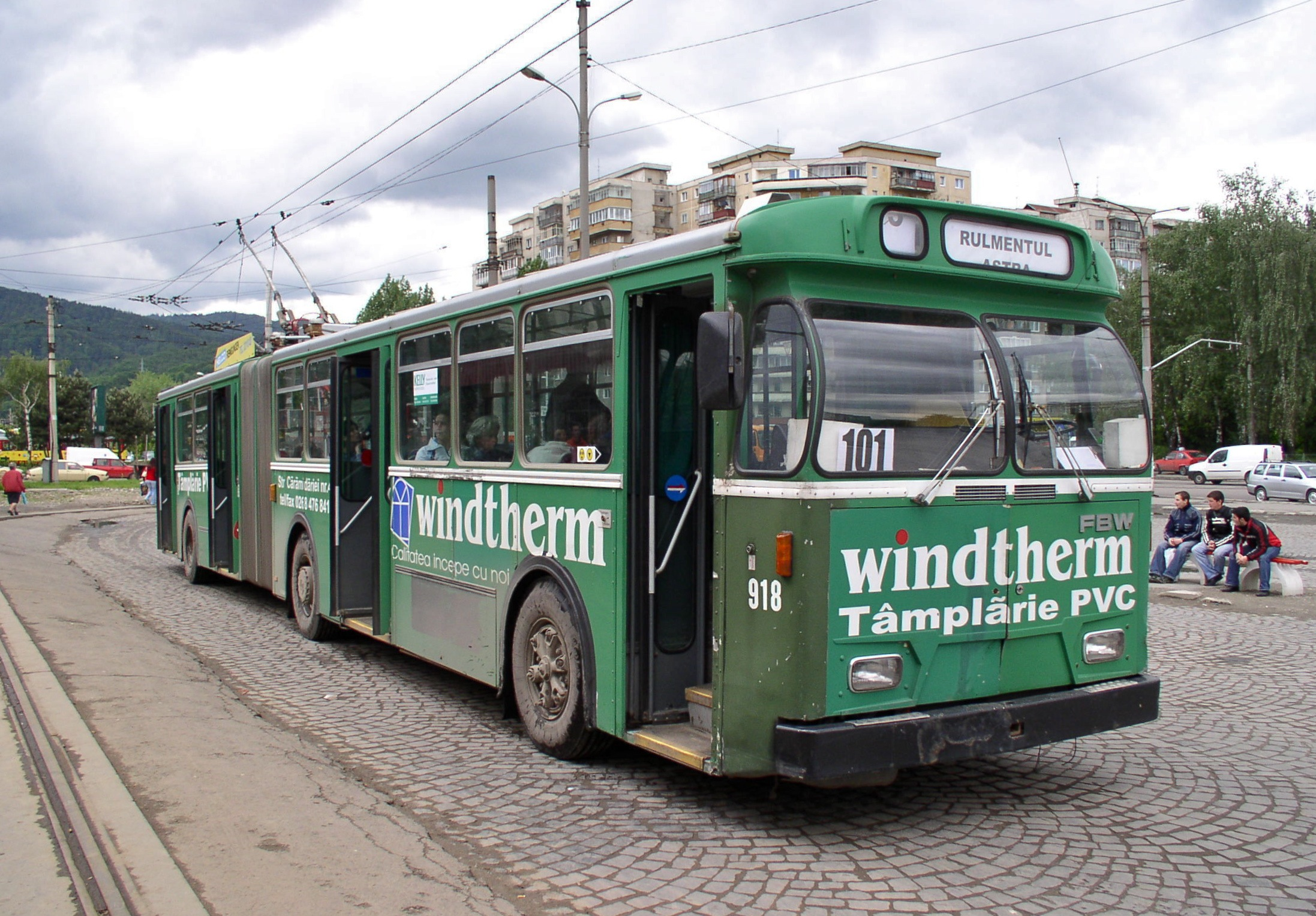
Ex-Basel trolleybus 918 in service in Braşov (Romania) in 2006, still wearing BVB fleet livery

Up until the closure of the system, motorbus no. 48 served as an overhead wire de-icer, and for that purpose was fitted with trolley poles.

Some of the retired trolleybuses were transferred to Pazardzhik and Ruse in Bulgaria as well as Braşov in Romania. Trolleybus no. 358 is now in the possession of the Lausanne-based RétroBus Léman museum society.

== Depot ==
The vehicles in Basel's trolleybus fleet were kept at the Rankstrasse bus garage, on line 31. The garage was also connected with line 33 via non-revenue wires (wiring not used for passenger service) from Basel Badischer Bahnhof.

== See also ==
- List of trolleybus systems in Switzerland
