= Baselland Transport =

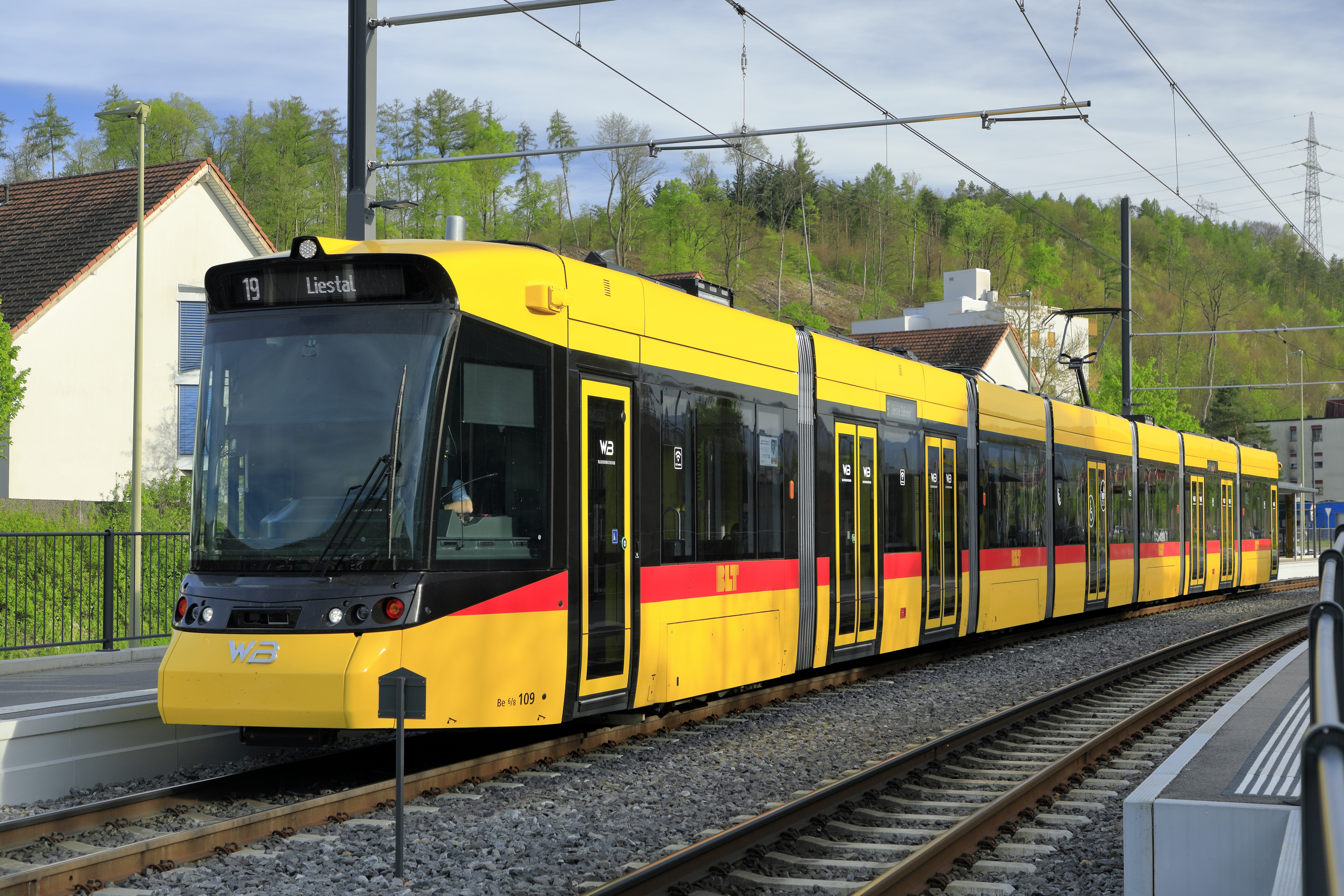
- Industry: Public transport
- Founded: 1974
- Headquarters: Oberwil, Switzerland
- Owner: canton of Basel-Land
- Website: www.blt.ch

Baselland Transport AG (BLT) is a Swiss public transport operator in the cantons of Basel-Land, Basel-Stadt, Solothurn and in France. The BLT was founded in 1974, and is owned by the Canton of Basel-Land, located to the south of the city. It transports some 48 million passengers per year, using a fleet of 64 buses and 100 trams over a network of 165 kilometres (103 mi) of bus routes and 65 kilometres (40 mi) of tram routes.

The BLT jointly operates the Basel tram network with Basler Verkehrs-Betriebe (BVB), owned by the canton of Basel-Stadt. Whilst the BVB owns and operates the inner-city network, the BLT owns the infrastructure for five longer suburban routes and operates four of these itself, leaving the fifth to the BVB to operate. All the BLT routes operate over BVB infrastructure in the inner-city. Both are part of the integrated fare network Tarifverbund Nordwestschweiz (TNW), which in itself is part of the three countries-integrated fare network triregio. It also owns and operates the 750 mm (2 ft 5 1/2 in) Waldenburg railway, converted in 2022 to 1000mm.

The BLT's suburban routes include the 25.6 kilometres (15.9 mi) long international route 10, which connects Basel with Rodersdorf in the canton of Solothurn, passing through the French commune of Leymen en route.

== History ==
BLT was formed in 1974, through the joining together of four tram and railway companies. These were:

- Birsigtalbahn (BTB)
- Birseckbahn (BEB)
- Trambahn Basel-Aesch (TBA)
- Basellandschaftliche Ueberlandbahn (BUeB)

== Information ==
- Bus Network: 115.940 km
- Tram Network 65.162 km
- Railway network: 13.1 kilometres (8.1 mi)
- Rolling stock (2002): Approx 30 Buses, 100 trams
- Passenger figures (2002): 39,782,620
- Gauge: 1000mm (trams), 750mm (Waldenburg railway)
- Depots: Hüslimatt, Dreispitz

== Rail and tram lines ==
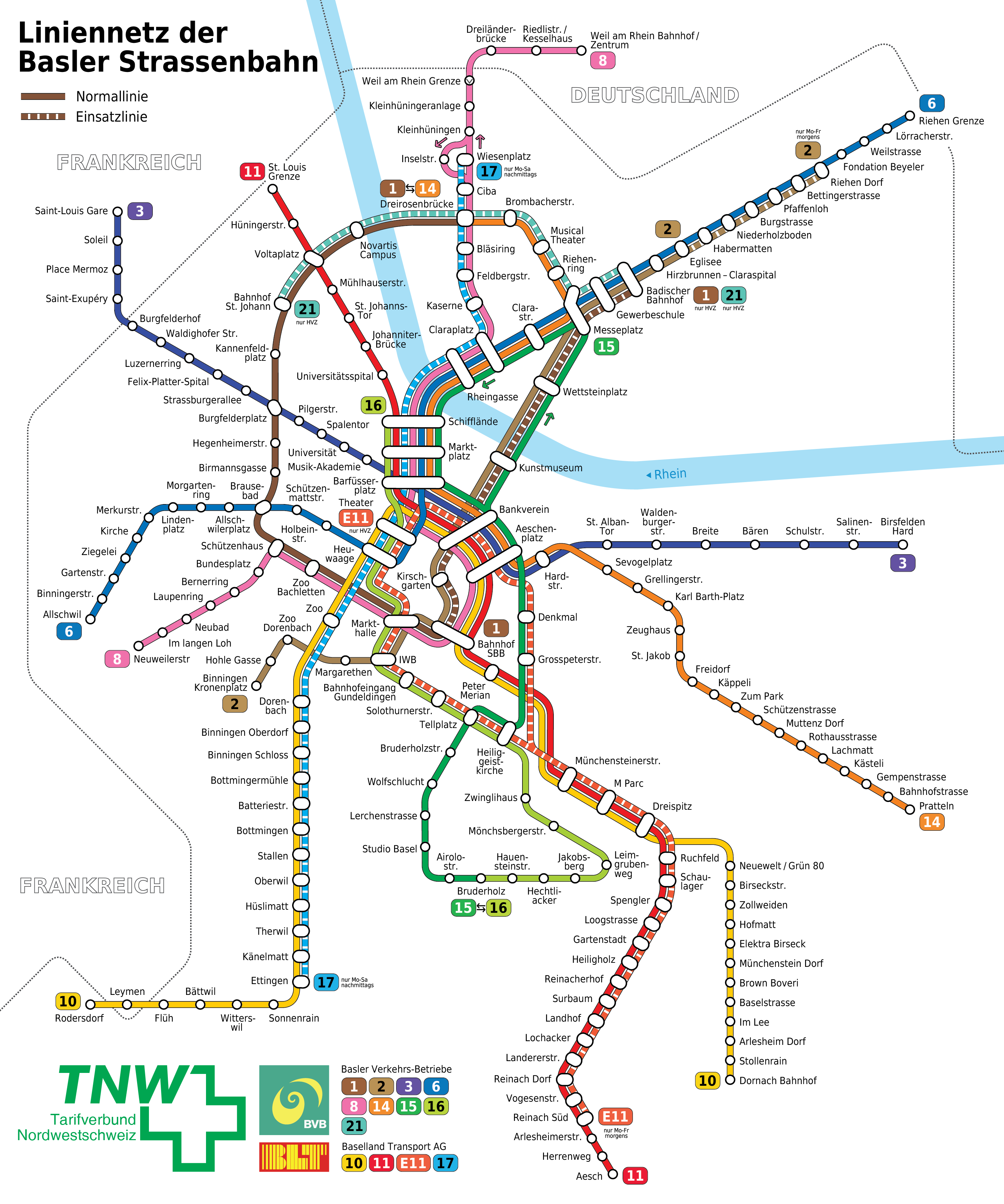
Basel tram network (2009)

Baselland Transport owns five 1,000 mm (3 ft 3 3/8 in) railway lines over which it operates five tram services: (Note: Basler Verkehrs-Betriebe operates line 14 on the Basel–Pratteln railway line.)

Line	Length	Opened	Services
Basel–Aesch	8.2 kilometres (5.1 mi)	1907	11, E11
Basel–Dornach	6.2 kilometres (3.9 mi)	1902	10
Basel–Pratteln	6.2 kilometres (3.9 mi)	1921	14
Basel–Rodersdorf	16.2 kilometres (10.1 mi)	1887	10, 17
Waldenburg	13.1 kilometres (8.1 mi)	1880	19

== Buslines ==
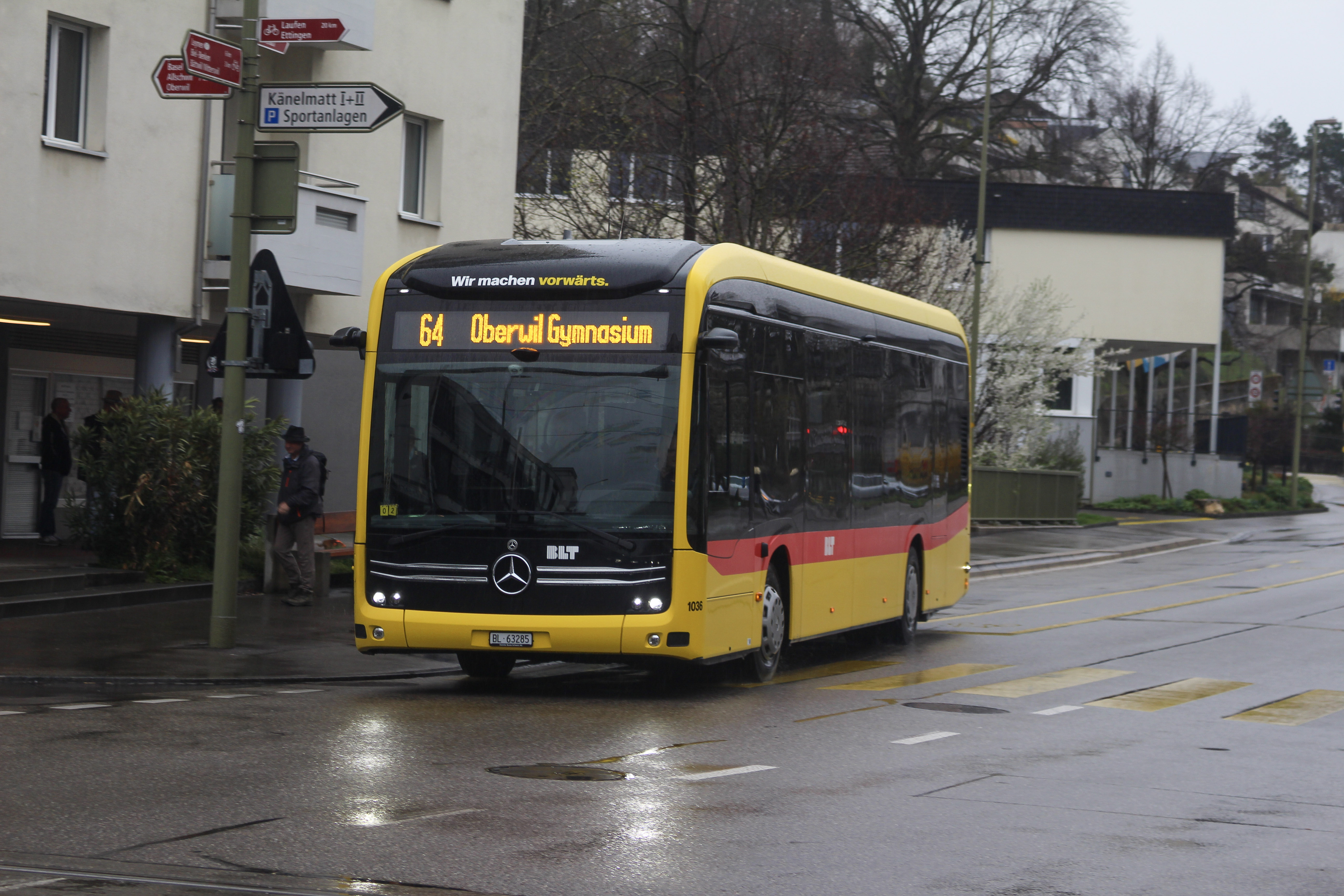
BLT bus in Therwil

- 37 Bottmingen - Bruderholzspital - Jakobsberg - Ulmenweg - Aeschenplatz (Bottmingen- Jakobsberg was operated by BVB from 2001)
- 47 Bottmingen - Bruderholzspital - Jakobsberg - St. Jakob - Muttenz
- 59 Bottmingen - Oberwil
- 60 Biel-Benken - Bottmingen - Muttenz Bahnhof - Schweizerhalle
- 61 Allschwil - Binningen - Oberwil - Hüslimatt
- 63 Dornach - Münchenstein - Muttenz
- 64 Bahnhof St. Johann - Bachgraben - Allschwil - Oberwil - Therwil - Reinach - Dornach
- 65 Arlesheim Dorf - Dornach - Aesch - Pfeffingen
- 66 Local Bus of Dornach
- 91 Waldenburg - Reigoldswil - Bretzwil
- 92 Hölstein - Bennwil
- 93 Lampenberg Dorf - Ramlinsburg - Talhaus
- 106 Sissach - Nusshof - Wintersingen
- 107 Böckten - Sissach - Eptingen
- 108 Sissach - Buckten - Känerkinden
- 109 Rümlingen - Häfelfingen

== Vehicles ==
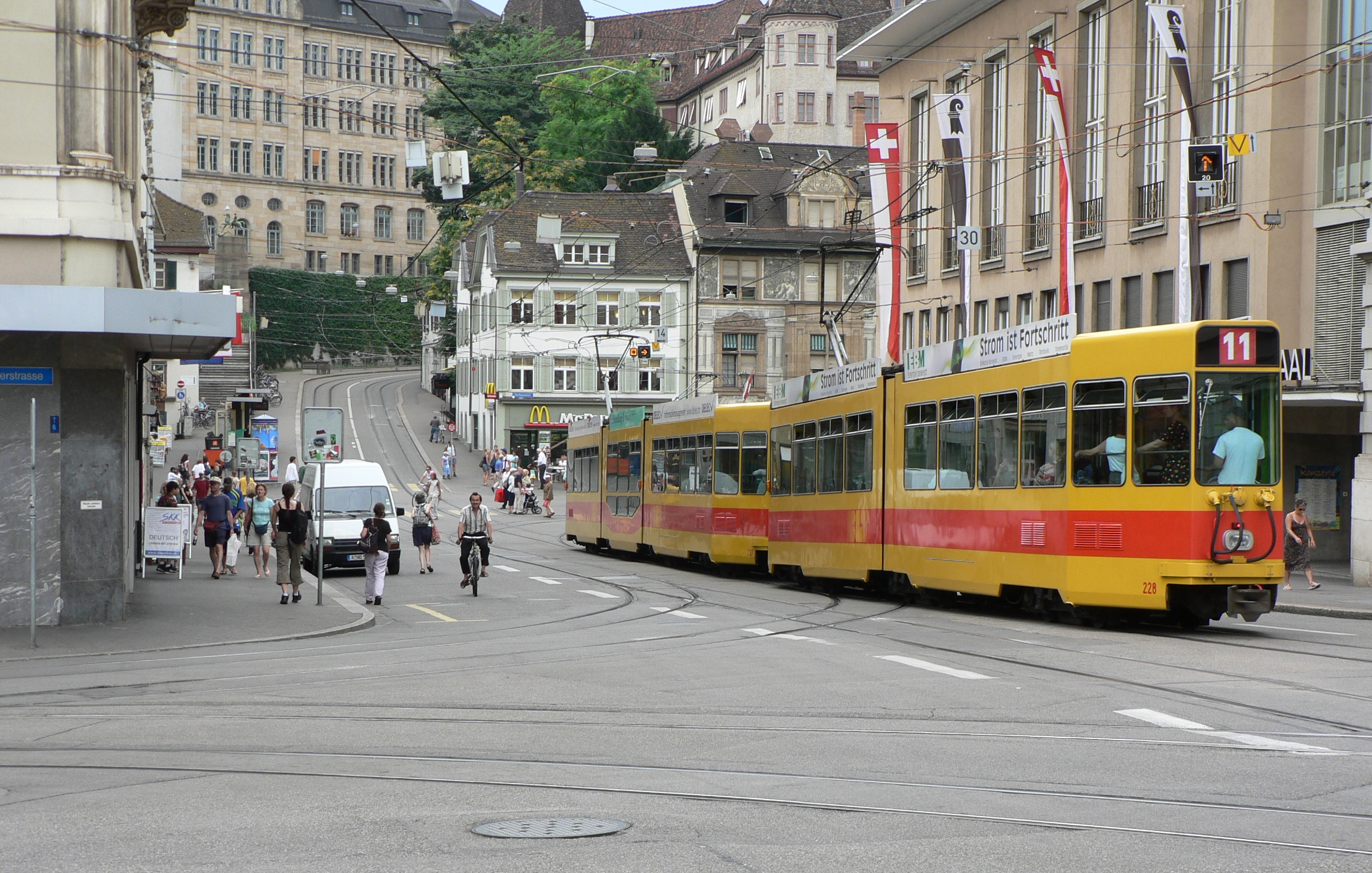
Legacy BLT stock; a 2 section BLT 4/6 coupled with a 3 section BLT 4/8, both built by Schindler.

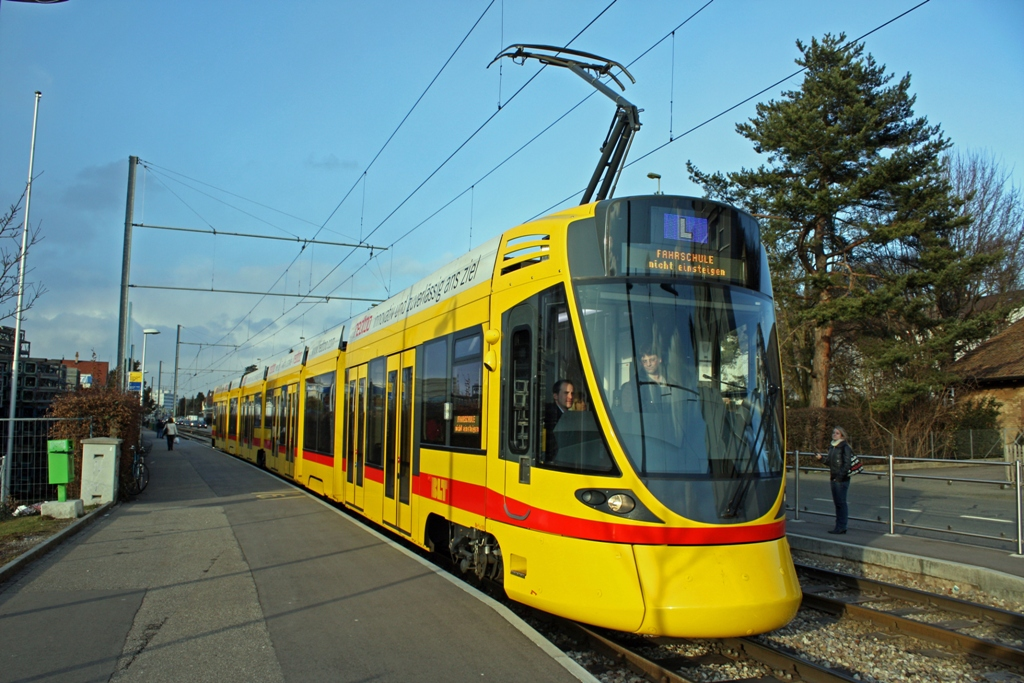
Newly delivered Stadler Tango Tram on a driver training run

=== Tram ===
BLT operates a modern fleet of entirely Stadler rolling stock.

Class	Image	Type	Top speed		Sections	Length metres	Capacity			Number built	Number in service	Fleet numbers	Routes operated	Built	Years operated	Notes
Class	Image	Type	mph	km/h	Sections	Length metres	Std	Sdg	Total	Number built	Number in service	Fleet numbers	Routes operated	Built	Years operated	Notes
Tango (Be 6/10)		Tram	50	80	6	44.89	167	101	268	38	38	151–154, 155–169, 171–189	10, 11	2008–2016	2009–present	
TINA (Be 8/10)		Tram	50	80	7	45.50	160	96	256	25	25	4201–4225	10, 11, 17, E11	2023–2025	2024–present	
Tramlink (Be 6/8)		Tram	50	80	7	44.18	177	104	281	10	10	101–110	19	2022	2022–present	Operates the Waldenburgerbahn Fiited with GoA2 as the Waldenburgerbahn is the first Swiss Railway approved for it. (February 2026)

=== Bus ===
Class	Image	Top speed		Length metres	Capacity			Number built	Number in service	Fleet numbers	Built	Years operated
Class	Image	mph	km/h	Length metres	Std	Sdg	Total	Number built	Number in service	Fleet numbers	Built	Years operated
Sprinter City 65	Bus of the same model in Poland			7.72			26	5	4	21–25	2007–2015	2007–present
Citaro G FL	Bus of the same model in Heidelberg	53	85	17.94	93	42	135	2		54–55	2011	2011–present
Citaro G C2	Bus of the same model in Nice	53	85	18.10	94–100	40–43	137–140	22		15–19, 51–53, 56–59, 90–99	2012–2021	2012–present
Citaro C2		62	100	12.14	65	31	96	23	18	1–4, 8, 30–34, 69, 81–87	2013–2020	2013–present
eCitaro		50	80	12.14	39–42	30	69–72	36		1001–1005, 1010–1017, 1020–1028, 1030–1038, 1040–1044	2021–2026	2021–present
Lion's City 10 E	Bus of the same model at Busworld	52	83	10.58	53	31	84	3		1111–1113	2024	2024–present
Tremonia City 75 ELECTRIC	Bus of the same model at Busworld			8.47			34	1		21	2026	2026–present

== See also ==
- Transport in Switzerland
