= Birsig =

River in France and Switzerland

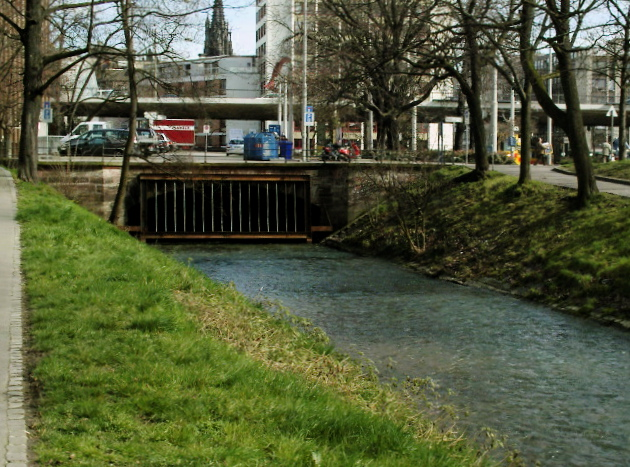
- Beginning of the Birsig's overbuilding near the Basel zoo

- Location within Switzerland

Location
- Countries: France; Switzerland

Physical characteristics
- Mouth
  - location: Rhine
  - coordinates: 47°33′37″N 7°35′17″E
- Length: 21 km (13 mi)
- Basin size: 82 km^{2} (32 mi^{2})

Basin features
- Progression: Rhine→ North Sea

The Birsig (German pronunciation: [ˈbɪʁzɪç]) is a rather small river in eastern France and northern Switzerland. Its source is in the village Biederthal, in the French Haut-Rhin department, near the Swiss border. The Birsig is about 21 kilometres (13 mi) long, and its watershed area is about 82 square kilometres (32 mi^{2}). It flows variably through Swiss and French territory and through the Birsig Valley. Afterwards it passes the city of Basel, where it enters the Rhine (left bank).

The river Birsig originally flowed openly through Basel, but the river was long ago channelled and its banks built up to prevent water damage to the houses. The river flowed directly along the houses in the lower part of the city, where many bridges were built over. It took the fecal waste from the houses and was therefore called "the city's big cloaca", which favoured the outbreak of cholera and typhus.

Nowadays the Birsig is covered over for most of its course in Basel; there are just a few hundred meters around the city zoo where the Birsig can be seen openly.
