= Biederthal =

Commune in Grand Est, France

Biederthal Bierthel
- Commune
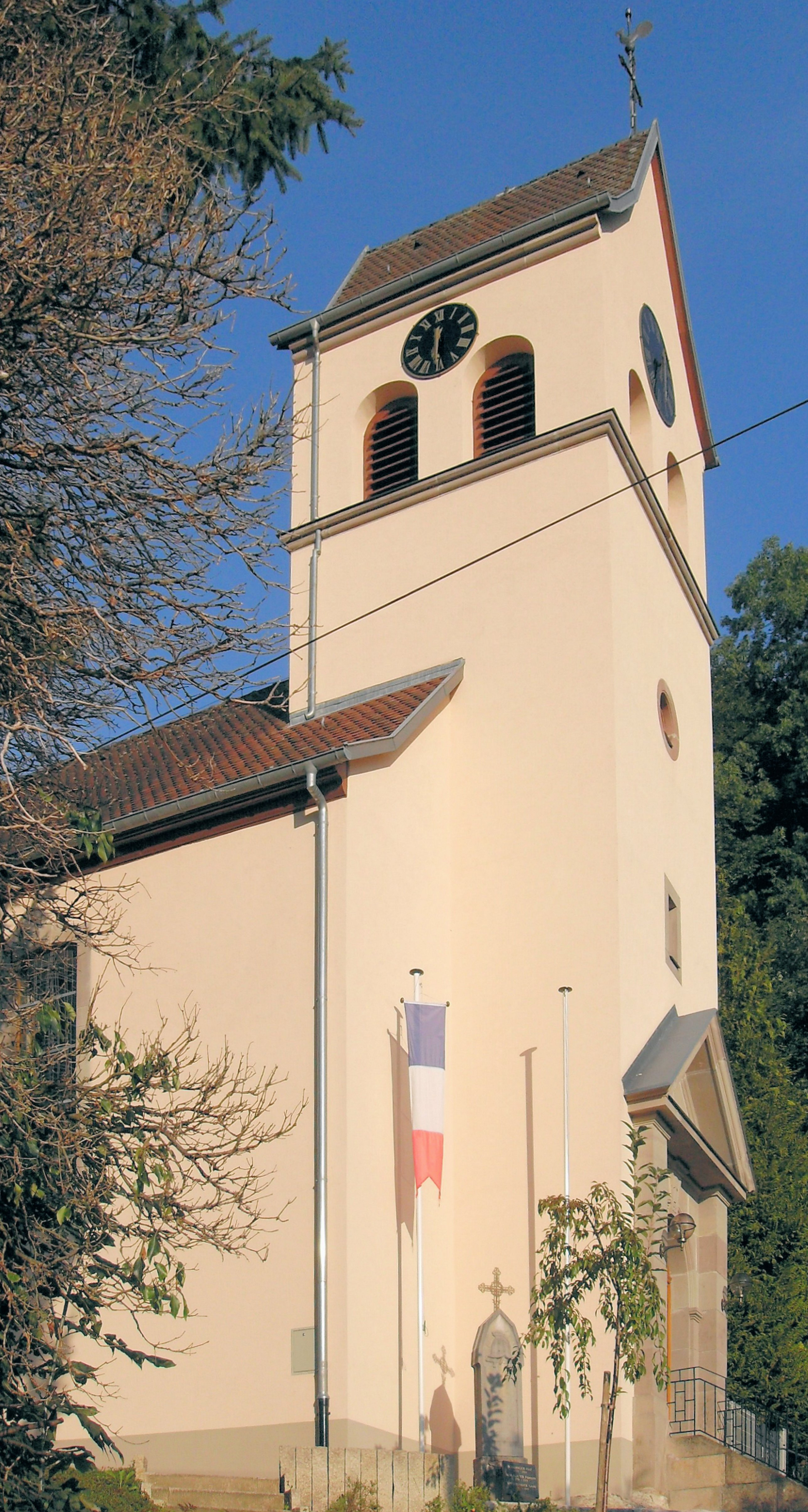
- Saint Michael Church in Biederthal

- Coat of arms
- Location of Biederthal
- Location within France Location within Grand Est
- Coordinates: 47°28′14″N 7°26′57″E
- Country: France
- Region: Grand Est
- Department: Haut-Rhin
- Arrondissement: Altkirch
- Canton: Altkirch

Government
  - Mayor (2020–2026): Danielle Cordier
- Area^{1}: 4.16 km^{2} (1.61 sq mi)
- Elevation: 420 m (1,380 ft)
- Highest elevation: 530 m (1,740 ft)
- Lowest elevation: 375 m (1,230 ft)
- Population (2023): 331
  - Density: 79.6/km^{2} (206/sq mi)
- Time zone: UTC+01:00 (CET)
  - Summer (DST): UTC+02:00 (CEST)
- INSEE/Postal code: 68035 /68480
- ^{1} French Land Register data, which excludes lakes, ponds, glaciers > 1 km^{2} (0.386 sq mi or 247 acres) and river estuaries.

Biederthal (Alemannic German: Bierthel) is a commune in the Haut-Rhin department in Alsace in north-eastern France. It is located on the border with Switzerland, next to the Swiss villages of Rodersdorf and Metzerlen-Mariastein.

== See also ==
- Communes of the Haut-Rhin department
