= Leymen =

Commune in Grand Est, France

- Commune
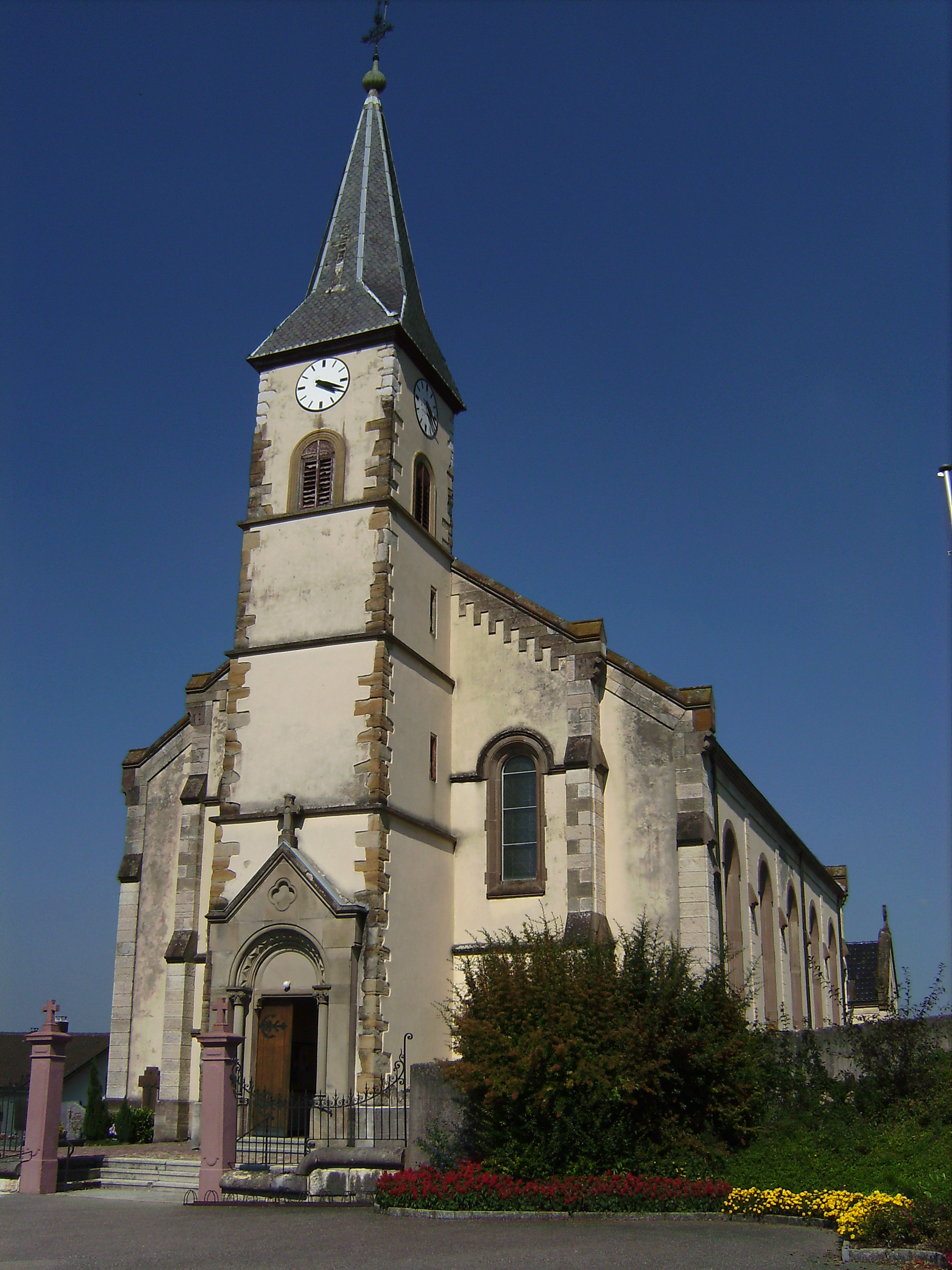
- Saint-Léger church in Leymen

- Coat of arms
- Location of Leymen
- Location within France Location within Grand Est
- Coordinates: 47°29′44″N 7°29′03″E
- Country: France
- Region: Grand Est
- Department: Haut-Rhin
- Arrondissement: Mulhouse
- Canton: Saint-Louis
- Intercommunality: Saint-Louis Agglomération

Government
  - Mayor (2020–2026): Rémy Otmane
- Area^{1}: 11.64 km^{2} (4.49 sq mi)
- Elevation: 347 m (1,138 ft)
- Highest elevation: 584 m (1,916 ft)
- Lowest elevation: 315 m (1,033 ft)
- Population (2023): 1,271
  - Density: 109.2/km^{2} (282.8/sq mi)
- Time zone: UTC+01:00 (CET)
  - Summer (DST): UTC+02:00 (CEST)
- INSEE/Postal code: 68182 /68220
- ^{1} French Land Register data, which excludes lakes, ponds, glaciers > 1 km^{2} (0.386 sq mi or 247 acres) and river estuaries.

Leymen (French pronunciation: [laimən]; German: Leimen) is a commune in the Haut-Rhin department in Alsace in north-eastern France. The commune is served by Leymen station, on line 10 of the Basel tramway between Rodersdorf and Flüh, and until December 2017 was the only such station to be located on French soil.

== See also ==
- Communes of the Haut-Rhin département
