= Basler Verkehrs-Betriebe =

Swiss public transport operator

- Industry: Public transport
- Founded: 1895
- Owner: canton of Basel-Stadt
- Website: www.bvb.ch

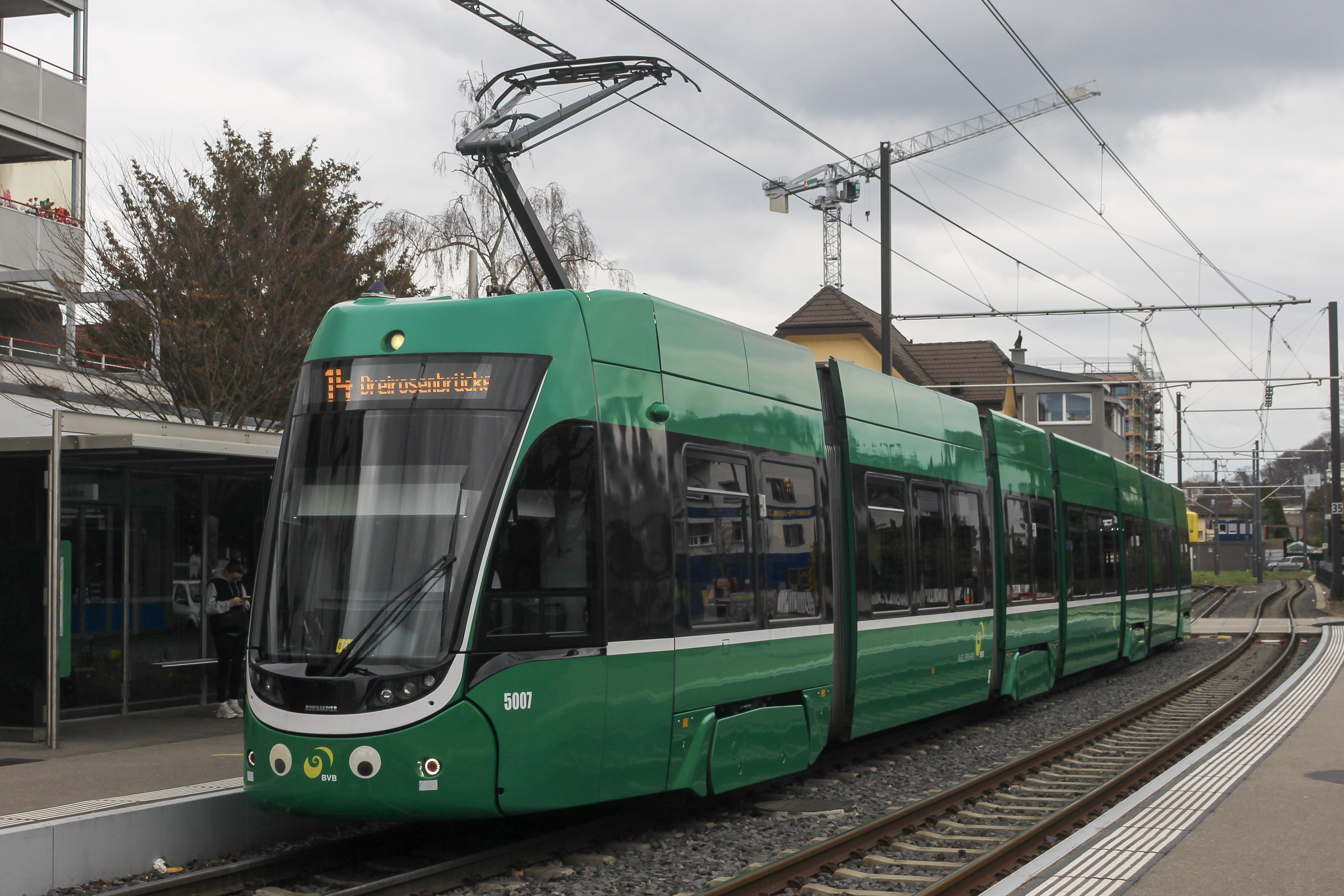
A Bombardier Flexity 2 tram of the BVB

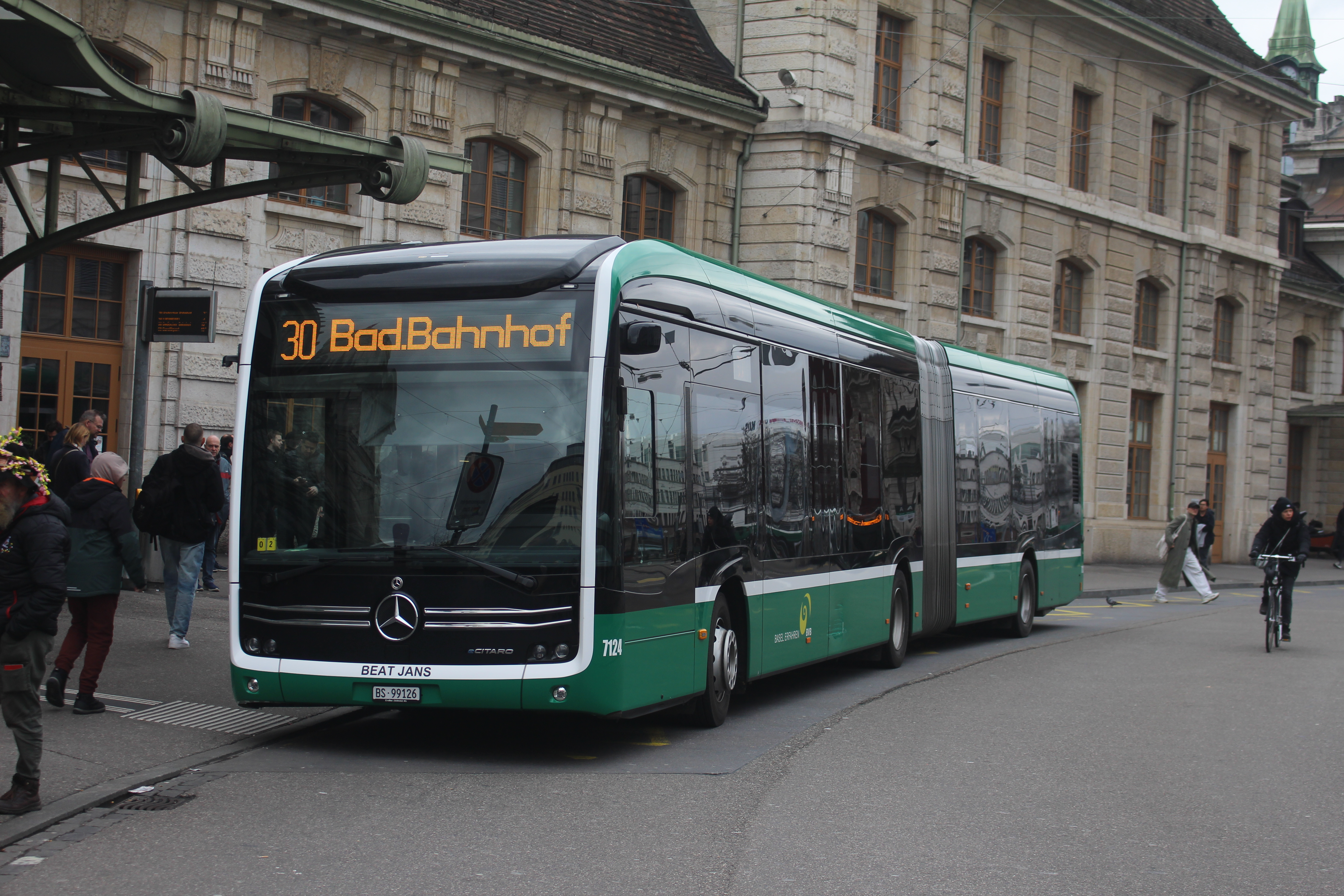
A Mercedes-Benz eCitaro bus of the BVB

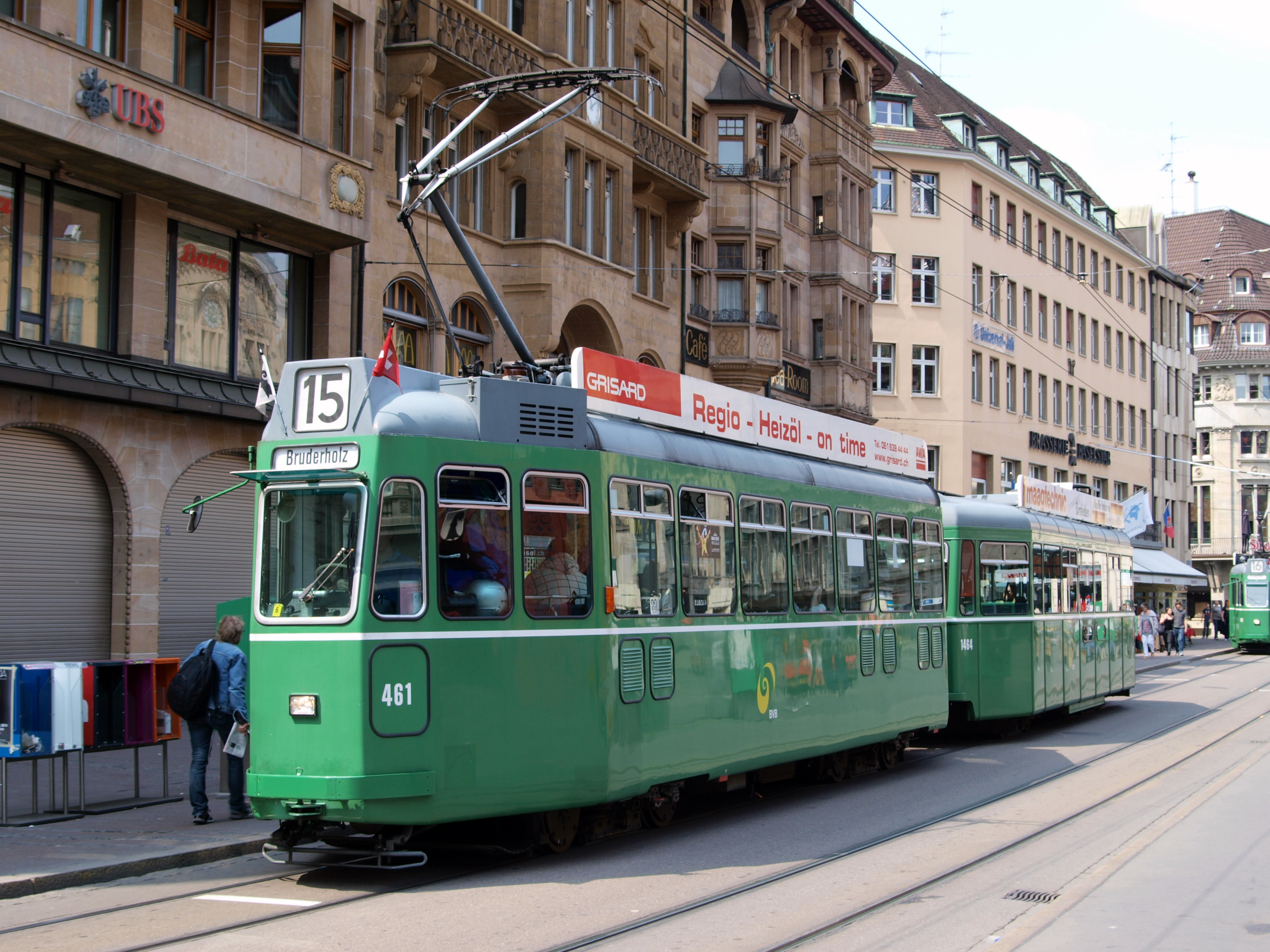
A BVB tram in 2009

Basler Verkehrs-Betriebe (BVB) is a public transport operator in the Swiss city of Basel, and is wholly owned by canton of Basel-Stadt, which consists of city of Basel and the municipalities of Bettingen and Riehen. The BVB was founded in 1895, and became a self-governing public corporation on 1 January 2006. It transports 132 million passengers per year, an average of roughly 360000 per day. It operates 128 motor trams and 74 trailers on 9 tram routes, as well as 99 buses on a total of 13 bus routes. These are kept operating by 1200 employees.

BVB jointly operates the Basel tram network with Baselland Transport AG (BLT), owned by the adjoining canton of Basel-Land. Whilst the BVB tends to operate the shorter urban services using green-coloured trams, its routes extend beyond the inner city into Basel-Land and parts of the German city of Weil am Rhein. Likewise the yellow-coloured BLT trams operate into the city centre. Both are part of the integrated fare network Tarifverbund Nordwestschweiz (TNW), which in itself is part of the three-country integrated fare network Triregio.

== History ==
Heinrich Imhoff was the pioneer of the Basler tramways who in 1880 obtained the concession from the local government in Basel to operate a horse-drawn "Tramomnibus". On 11 July 1881, a horse-drawn omnibus, popularly known as the "Rösslitram", began to operate. According to a fixed timetable, it connected the Badischer Bahnhof (which at that time stood at today's Messeplatz) with the Centralbahnhof (today's SBB railway station) crossing the Rhine over the Middle Bridge every 20 minutes. There were 6 coaches and 42 horses in service. The journey from station to station took 22 minutes. The Rösslitram ran without rails like a normal carriage on the road. The carriages were pulled by two horses, and a third horse had to be harnessed for each ascent on the Steinenberg. The operators were often negotiating for a better concession from the city of Basel and in 1892 the city council of Basel decided to build their own tramway.

== Tramway ==
The tramway was built between 1892 and 1895. In April 1895 the electrified tramway drove for the first time and in May the same year it was inaugurated to the public. In the first year, the company transported 2.7 million passengers, or three times more than the former Tramomnibus operator in the preceding year.

In April 1896 the city council decided on the expansion of the tramways and by 1897 additional lines were taken into service. Until 1908 lines to Riehen, Birsfelden and Allschwil among others were operated. In 1995 the tramway network accounted to 53 kilometers. Today, Basel has the largest tramway in terms of kilometers of rail tracks in Switzerland. Historically, only Geneva had a larger one at some point.

== Buses ==
In 1930, bus lines to Bettingen and the cemetery of Basel were placed in service. The bus network expanded through the 1950s and 1960s, until by 1995 it had surpassed even the extent of the tramway network. BVB operated the Basel trolleybus system until its closure in 2008.

== Employees ==
The tramway began its operation in 1895 with 43 employees, of whom all were men, and thanks to interventions by the social democratic politician Eugen Wullschleger, the new state company hired several employees of the private Tramomnibus operator. As in 1939, 320 men had to enter military service due to World War II, there was suddenly a lack of employees. Thereafter, women were recruited. The employees were organized in a workers' union since 1897. In the 1930s the employees had their own choir and football club.

== Fleet ==
=== Tram ===
Class	Image	Type	Top speed		Sections	Length metres	Capacity			Number built	Number in service	Fleet numbers	Routes operated	Built	Years operated
Class	Image	Type	mph	km/h	Sections	Length metres	Total	Std	Sdg	Number built	Number in service	Fleet numbers	Routes operated	Built	Years operated
Cornichon (Be 4/4)		Tram	37	60	1	13.97	70	28	98	26	25	477–502	2, 6, 15, 16, 21	1986–1987	1986–present
Combino (Be 6/8)		Tram	43	70	7	42.86	163	90	253	28	28	301–328	1/14, 2, 6, 8	2000–2002	2001–present
Flexity Basel (Be 6/8)		Tram	43	70	7	43.26	172	81	253	44	44	5001–5044	8,14,6,3	2014–2017	2014–present
Flexity Basel (Be 4/6)		Tram	43	70	5	31.83	123	60	183	17	17	6001–6017	15, 16, 21	2016–2018	2016–present

=== Bus ===
Class	Image	Top speed		Length metres	Capacity			Number built	Number in service	Fleet numbers	Built	Years operated
Class	Image	mph	km/h	Length metres	Std	Sdg	Total	Number built	Number in service	Fleet numbers	Built	Years operated
Auwärter CITYSTAR		43	70	7.83	9	11	20	5	3	861–865	2009	2009–present
Citaro C2 G		50	80	18.13	92	40	132	55		7001–7055	2015	2015–present
K-Bus City VIII		50	80	8.05	21	11	32	5		8601–8605	2018	2019–present
VDL Citea SLFA-181 Electric	Bus of the same model in Schiphol NL	50	80	18.15	77	39	116	1		7100	2018	2019–present
eCitaro		50	80	12.14	47	29	76	19		8101–8119	2022–2023	2022–present
eCitaro G	Visually similar to the C2 G	50	80	18.13	89	41	130	38		7101–7138	2023	2023–present
lighTram 25 OPP		50	80	24.37	106	44	150	8		9101–9108	2022–2023	2023–present

== See also ==
- Transport in Switzerland
