= Line 10 (BLT) =

International tramway line in Europe

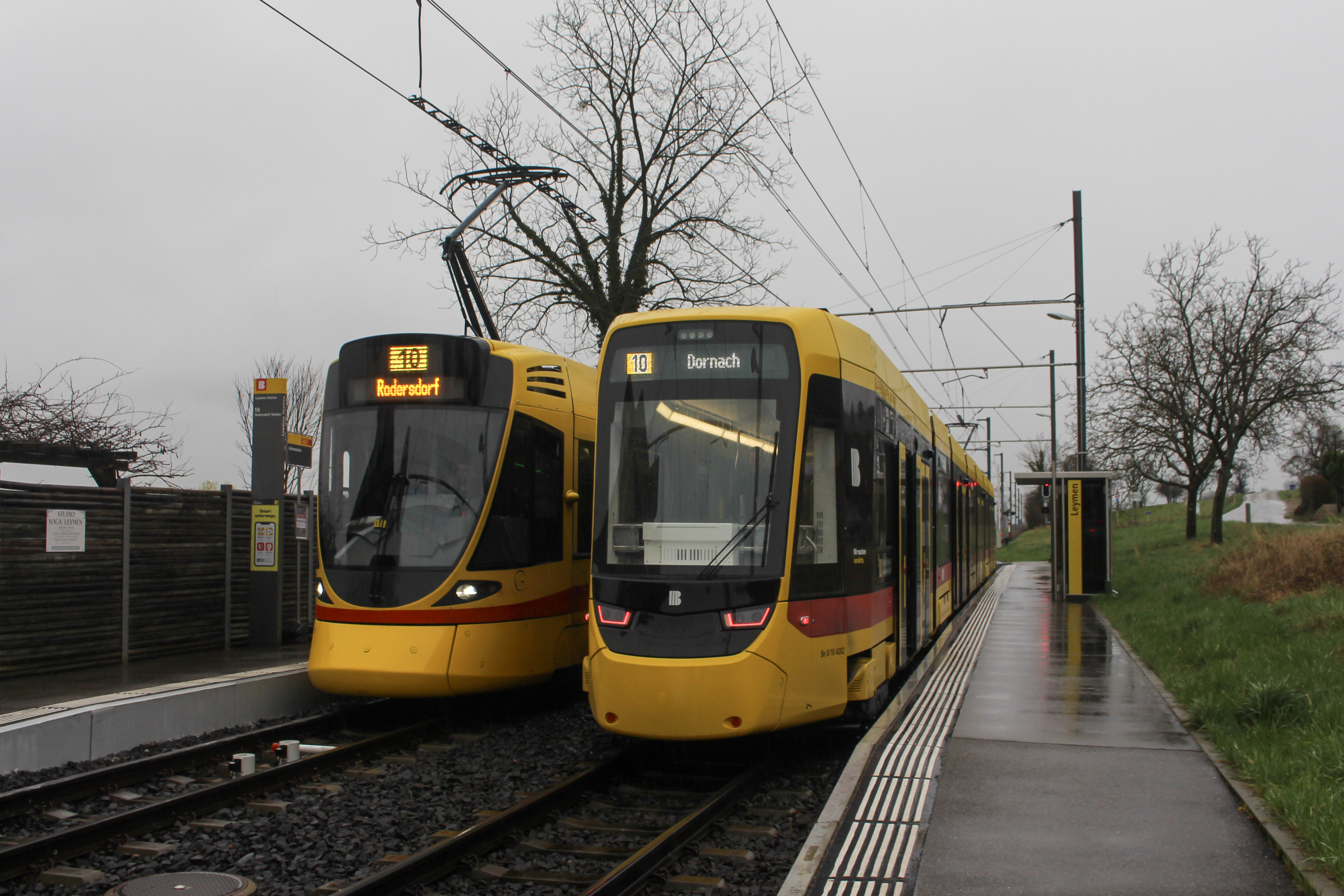
Two BLT trams on Line 10 at Leymen tram stop in France in March 2026.

BLT's tram line 10 is an international tramway line in Europe which is 25.6 kilometres (15.9 mi) in length. The line in the region of Basel, Switzerland, is operated by Baselland Transport (BLT).

The Basel–Dornach railway line opened in 1902 when it terminated at Aeschenplatz in Basel as part of the Birseckbahn (BEB). It was extended to Rodersdorf when BLT took control of the former Birsigtalbahn (BTB) 17 line from Rodersdorf (Canton of Solothurn) to Heuwaage in 1986. In 2001, both the 10 and 11 lines were redirected via Basel SBB, when BLT completed an extension from Münchensteinerstrasse to Basel SBB.

The line 10 is Basel's only direct tram line between the train station SBB and the main entrance to the Zoo Basel. It also has the almost-unique distinction of crossing an international border, as it passes through French territory for two miles and calls at the commune of Leymen in Alsace. There are just four other known international tram lines: Saarbrücken's Saarbahn from Germany to France (Sarreguemines), Strasbourg's D line to Kehl (Germany) and Basel's line 8 from Switzerland to Germany (Weil am Rhein). In 2017, the tram line 3 became the third international tram line in Basel when its terminus at Burgfelden Grenze was extended to Saint Louis station (Gare St. Louis) in France. The fifth one is the line 17 from Geneva (Switzerland) to Annemasse (France).

On Wednesday 2 November 2011 at 23.35 on the way to Dornach the tram derailed and crashed into a house at Tramstrasse after the Münchenstein Dorf stop injuring six and causing damages of over CHF 100,000 Swiss francs
