= Trams in Basel =

Overview of the tram system in Basel, Switzerland

Coordinates: 47°33′17″N 7°35′21″E

Basel tramway network
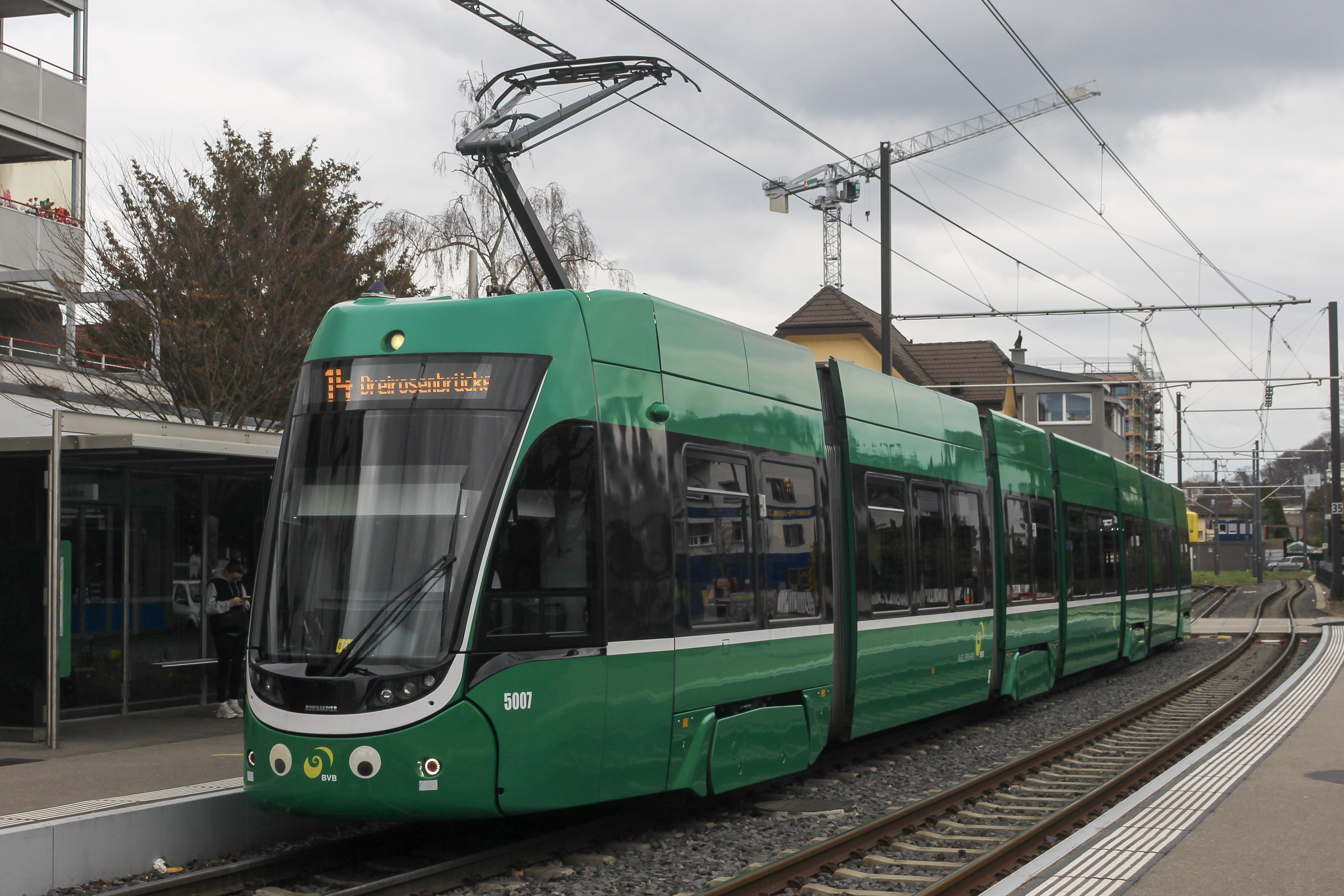
- A BVB Bombardier Flexity 2 tram on route 14 in 2026

Operation
- Locale: Basel, Switzerland
- Open: 6 May 1895
- Status: Operational
- Lines: 12
- Operators: Basler Verkehrs-Betriebe (BVB); Baselland Transport (BLT)

Infrastructure
- Track gauge: 1,000 mm (3 ft 3 3/8 in) metre gauge
- Electrification: 650 V DC

Statistics
- Route length: 128.5 km (79.8 mi)
Overview
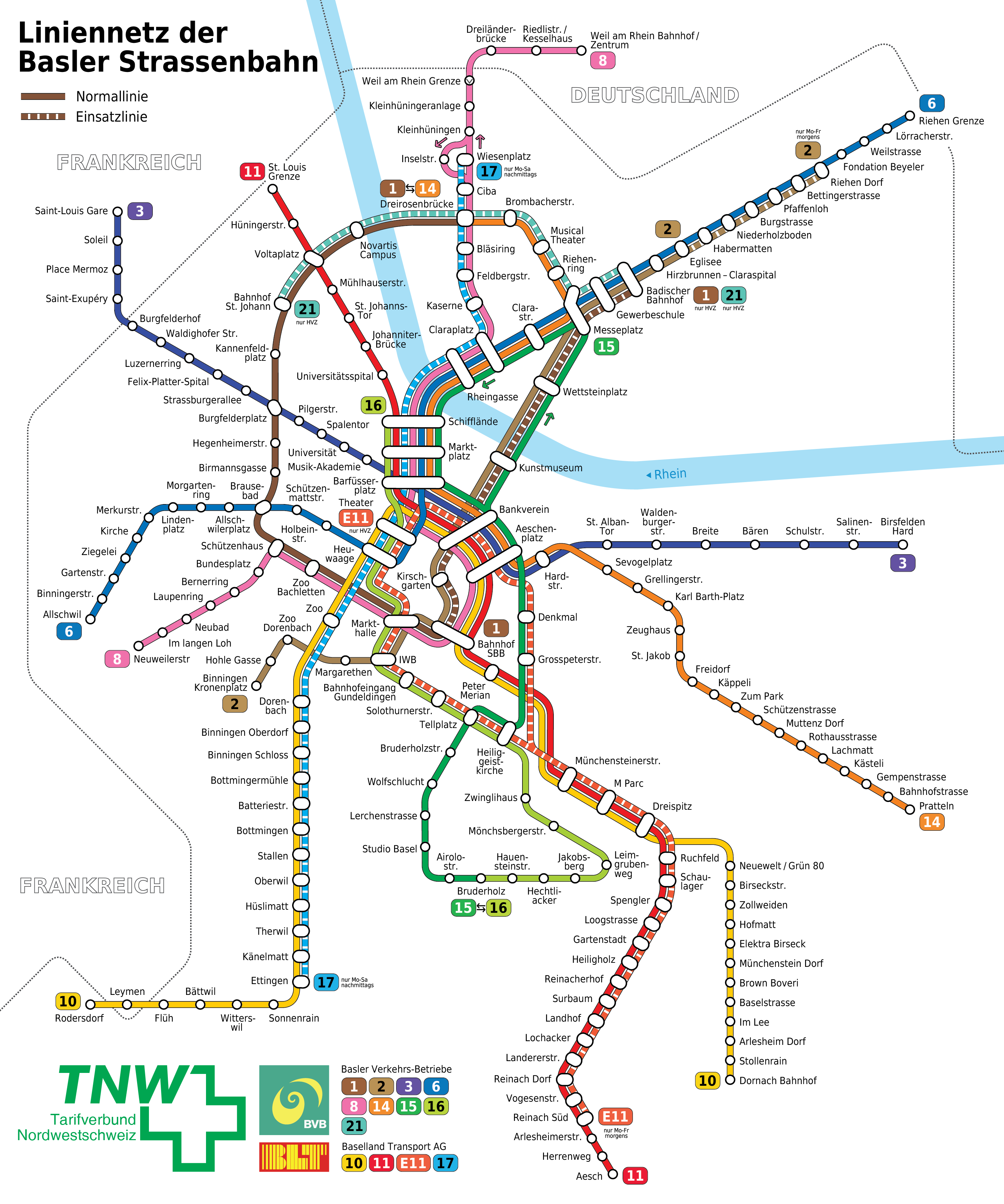
Map of the network in 2018.
- Website: http://www.bvb.ch Basler Verkehrs-Betriebe (in German)

The Basel tramway network (German: Basler Strassenbahn-Netz) is a network of tramways forming part of the public transport system in Basel, Switzerland, and its agglomeration - it also reaches into adjacent suburbs in Germany and France. The only two other tramway networks to cross an international border are Geneva's and Strasbourg's tramways. The Basel tram system consists of 12 lines. Due to its longevity (the network is now more than a century old), it is part of Basel's heritage and, alongside the Basel Minster, is one of the symbols of the city.

The trams on the network are operated by two transport providers: Basler Verkehrs-Betriebe (Basel Transport Service) (BVB) and Baselland Transport (BLT). Both operators are part of the integrated fare network Tarifverbund Nordwestschweiz (TNW), which in itself is part of the three countries-integrated fare network triregio.

BVB is owned by the Canton of Basel-Stadt. Its green trams operate mostly in the city, although termini of its lines 3, 6, 8 and 14 are across the cantonal or country border.

BLT is owned by the Canton of Basel-Land and has yellow and red livery. It owns the tram infrastructure in Basel-Land and runs the lines 10, 11 and 17 which pass through Basel on BVB-tracks. At the same time, BVB line 14 runs partially on BLT-tracks. BLT line 10 at one point passes through the territory of France.

== History ==
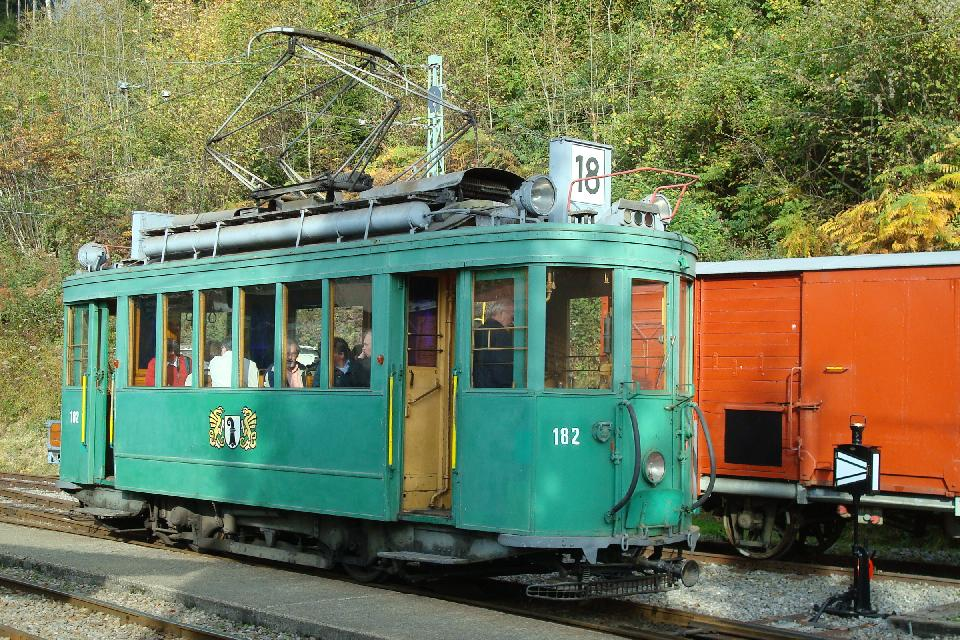
Ex-Basel heritage tram Ce 2/2 182 on the Blonay–Chamby Museum Railway

The first line of the Basel tramway network was opened on 6 May 1895. It followed the route Centralbahnhof–Marktplatz–Mittlere Brücke–Aeschenplatz–Badischer Bahnhof.

The network grew quickly. In 1897, six new sections were put in service, with one linking Basel and Birsfelden.

In 1900, the Basel tramway network acquired an international dimension, when a new cross-border line was opened to Sankt-Ludwig (now Saint-Louis, Haut-Rhin), in the then German Empire. The line operated until 1950. In 1910, a second international line was opened to Hüningen (now Huningue, also in Haut-Rhin), which was used until 1961. The line to Lörrach in Baden, Germany, was opened in 1919 and operated until 1967.

Since 1887, the tram from Basel to Rodersdorf, now part of Baselland Transport line n° 10, passed (and passes) through the village of Leymen in Alsace. Birsigthalbahn (Birsig Valley Railway) was joined to the general tram network of Basel as late as 1984.

From 1900 until 1936, at least one section of the network was modified each year. In 1934, upon the opening of a new section of line from Margarethenstr. to Binningen, the network reached its greatest length of 72 km (45 mi).

During the two World Wars, services were suspended on the parts of the line extending beyond Switzerland's borders. After World War II, several lines were closed. In 1958, the total length of the network's routes was 51.7 km (32.1 mi).

In 1974, the several companies that had been operating the suburban lines were merged to form the new company bearing the name Baselland Transport AG (BLT).

== Lines ==
As of 2022, the Basel tram network comprises 12 lines. Nine are operated by BVB and three by BLT. The combined line length of the 12 lines is 128.5 kilometres (79.8 mi). (Note: BVB operates Line No. 14 on behalf of BLT, using BLT infrastructure, and both companies include it in their annual reports.) (Note: The line length excludes the N6 and N14 night routes.)

No.	Route	Route length	Operator	Route map
1	Dreirosenbrücke – Brausebad - Bahnhof SBB (– Badischer Bahnhof)	7.31 kilometres (4.54 mi)	BVB	Route 1
2	Binningen Kronenplatz – Badischer Bahnhof - Eglisee (– Riehen Fondation Beyeler)	9.26 kilometres (5.75 mi)	BVB	Route 2
3	Saint-Louis (France) Burgfelderhof – Breite - Birsfelden Hard	9.58 kilometres (5.95 mi)	BVB	Route 3
6	Allschwil - Morgartenring – Badischer Bahnhof -Riehen Grenze	12.58 kilometres (7.82 mi)	BVB	Route 6
8	Neuweilerstrasse – Kleinhüningen - Weil am Rhein (Germany)	10.23 kilometres (6.36 mi)	BVB	Route 8
10	Rodersdorf - Flüh - Ettingen – Bahnhof SBB - Münchenstein-Dornach	25.974 kilometres (16.139 mi)	BLT	Route 10
11	St. Louis Grenze – Bahnhof SBB - Reinach Dorf - Aesch	14.235 kilometres (8.845 mi)	BLT	Route 11
14	Dreirosenbrücke - Aeschenplatz – Basel St. Jakob - Muttenz Dorf - Pratteln	12.81 kilometres (7.96 mi)	BVB	Route 14
15	Messeplatz – Bruderholz	5.39 kilometres (3.35 mi)	BVB	Route 15
16	Bruderholz – Schifflände	5.48 kilometres (3.41 mi)	BVB	Route 16
17	Wiesenplatz – Ettingen	12.215 kilometres (7.590 mi)	BLT	Route 17
21	Bahnhof St. Johann – Badischer Bahnhof	3.50 kilometres (2.17 mi)	BVB	Route 21

=== Cross-border routes ===
The Basel tram network is unusual in crossing international borders.

Line 10 to Rodersdorf runs via Leymen in France. For customs purposes the trams operate through France as privileged transit traffic. Passengers remaining on the tram are not subject to customs rules. Passengers may get on or off the tram in Leymen only if they are carrying goods within the customs limits.

In 2014, line 8 was extended across the border to Weil am Rhein station, in Germany.

Construction started in 2015 to extend Line 3 from its then-terminus at Bourgfelden Grenze to Saint-Louis station in France. The extension opened in 2017. Late-night services on the cross-border line were suspended in 2019 due to a series of attacks in which laser pointers were used to obstruct the vision of tram operators.

== See also ==
- Basel S-Bahn
- List of town tramway systems in Switzerland
- Trolleybuses in Basel
