= List of cities in Switzerland =

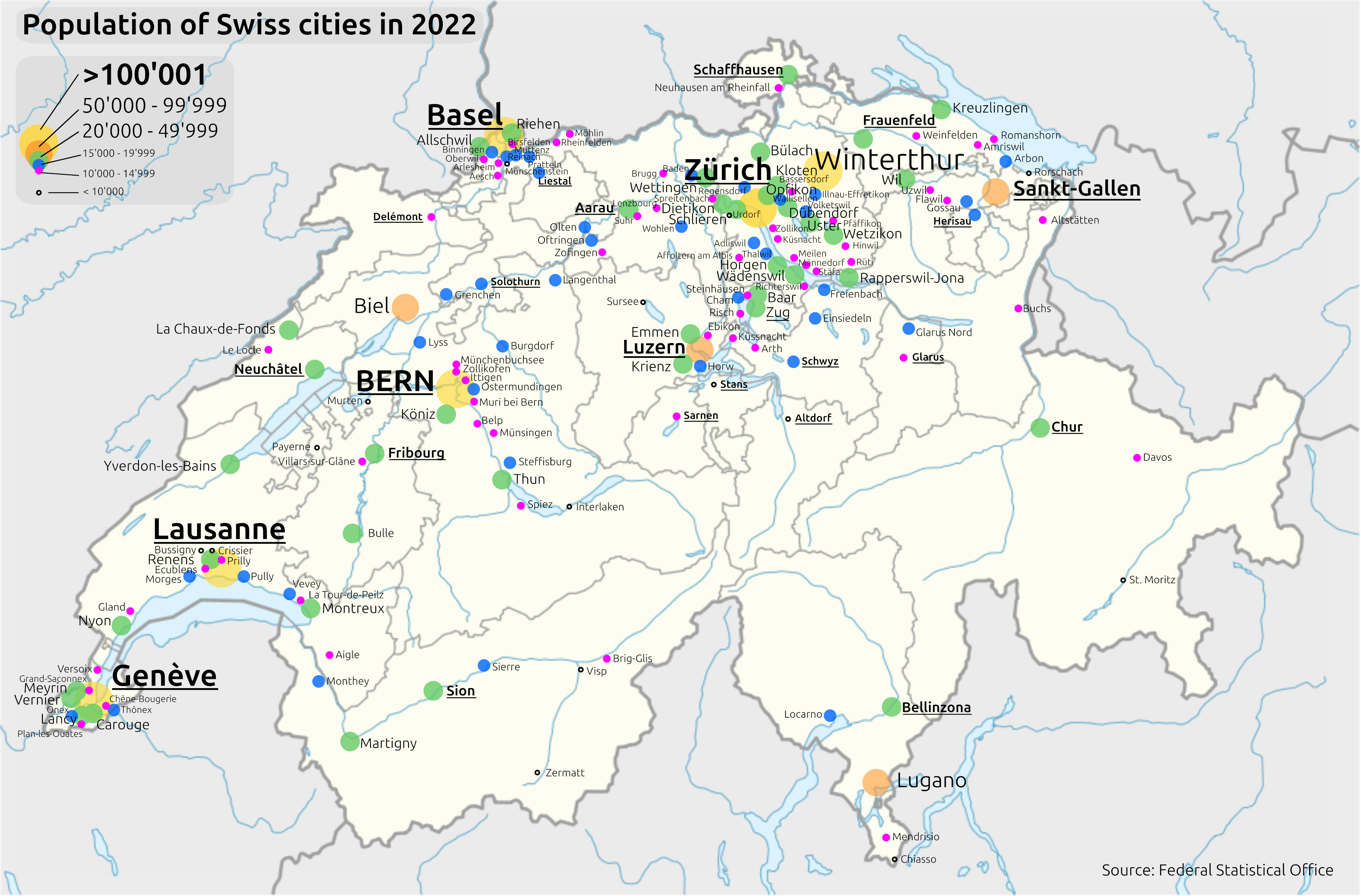
Population of towns (2022)

In Switzerland there is no difference between town (German: Stadt, French: ville(s), Italian: città) and city (German: Grossstadt, French: grande ville(s), Italian: metropoli) by definition; the latter is in no use in Swiss contexts.

Below is a list of towns and cities in Switzerland. Until 2014 municipalities with more than 10,000 inhabitants were considered to be towns. Since 2014, the Federal Statistical Office (FSO) uses a new algorithm (called German: Statistische Städte 2012, or French: Villes statistiques 2012) to define whether a municipality can be called a town or not; it now also depends on its character. Currently, FSO considers 162 municipalities as towns/cities (German: Statistische Städte, French: Villes statistiques) in Switzerland. Further, some municipalities which would fulfill such a definition nevertheless prefer to understand themselves still as a village, or consequently refer to themselves just as municipalities (German: Gemeinde, French: commune, Italian: comune). The Swiss definition of a town differs from the definition of a municipality.

== List of towns and cities ==
This is an alphabetical list of towns or cities (these English terms can be used interchangeably, as there is no official differentiation), which follows the FSO's definition (German: Statistische Städte 2012, French: Villes statistiques 2012), as well as places with historic town rights (h) and/or market towns (m).

- Places in **bold print** are towns because of the FSO's definition and historic town/market rights.
- Places in italics are towns excluded by the FSO's definition, but places which have either historic town rights (h) or historic market rights (m).
- Places in normal print are towns according to the FSO's definition.
- Places that had lost historic town rights previously are identified with "-h".
- Cantonal capitals (German: Hauptort, French: chef-lieu, Italian: capoluogo) are underlined.
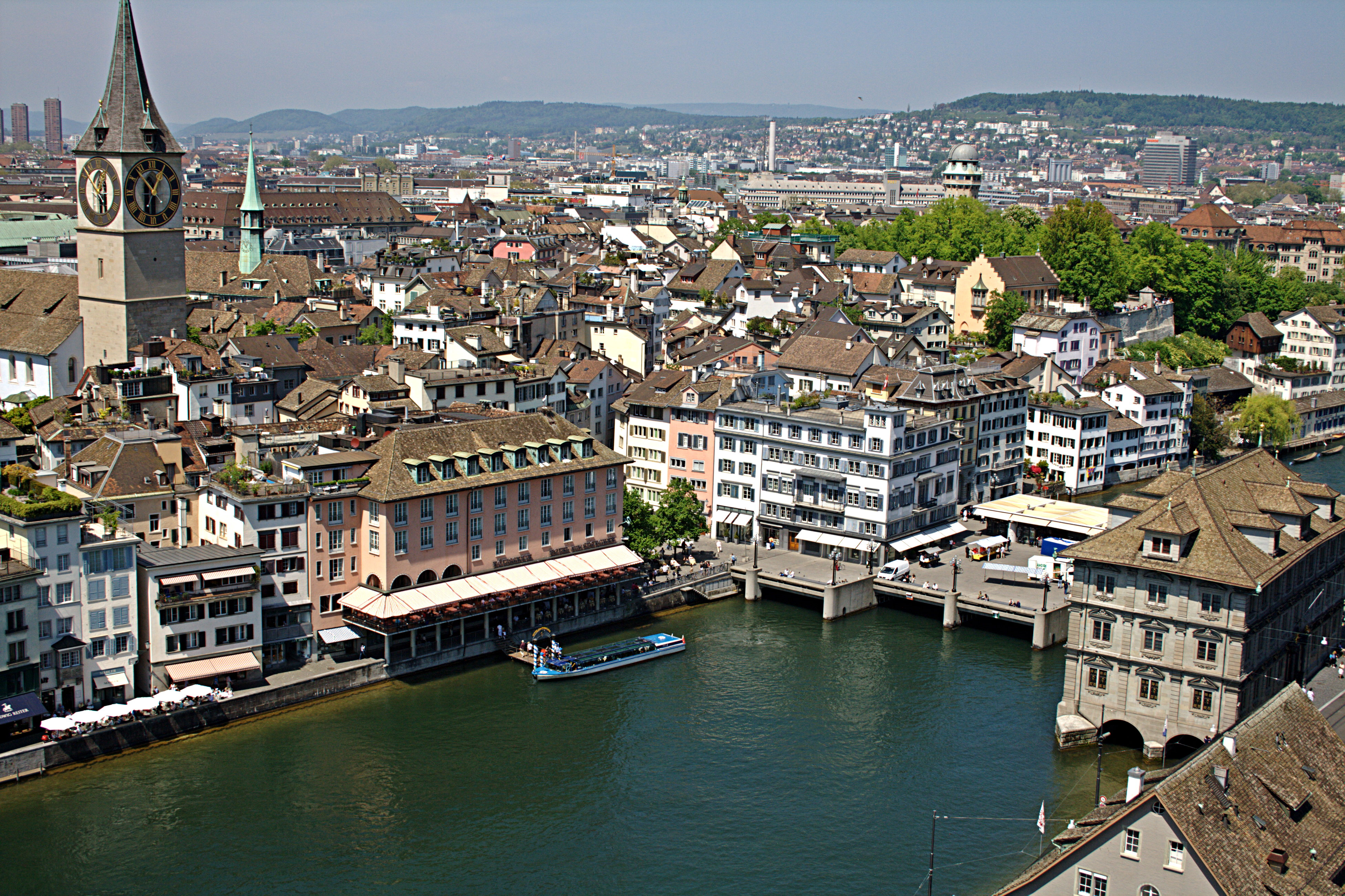
Zürich

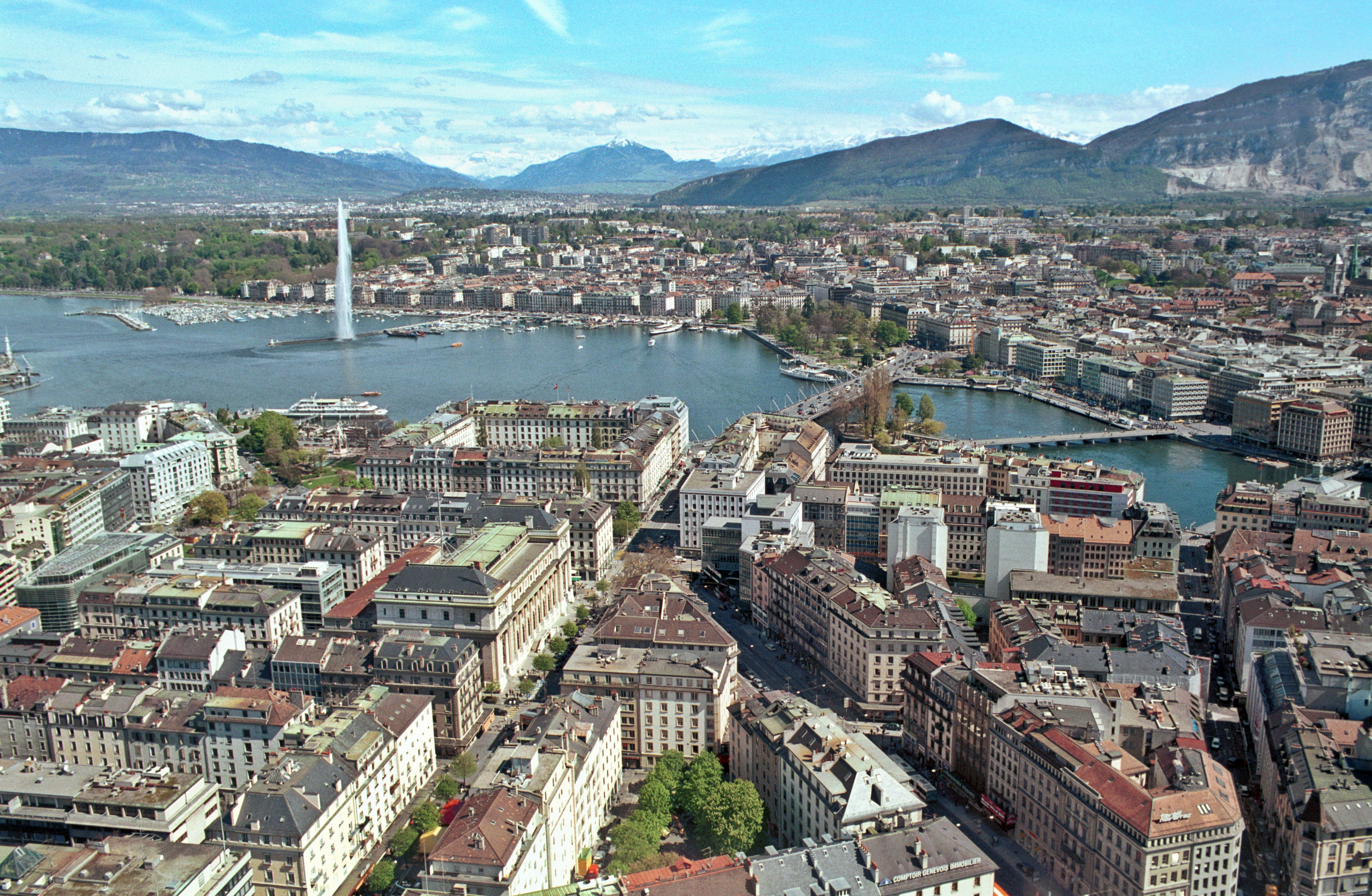
Geneva

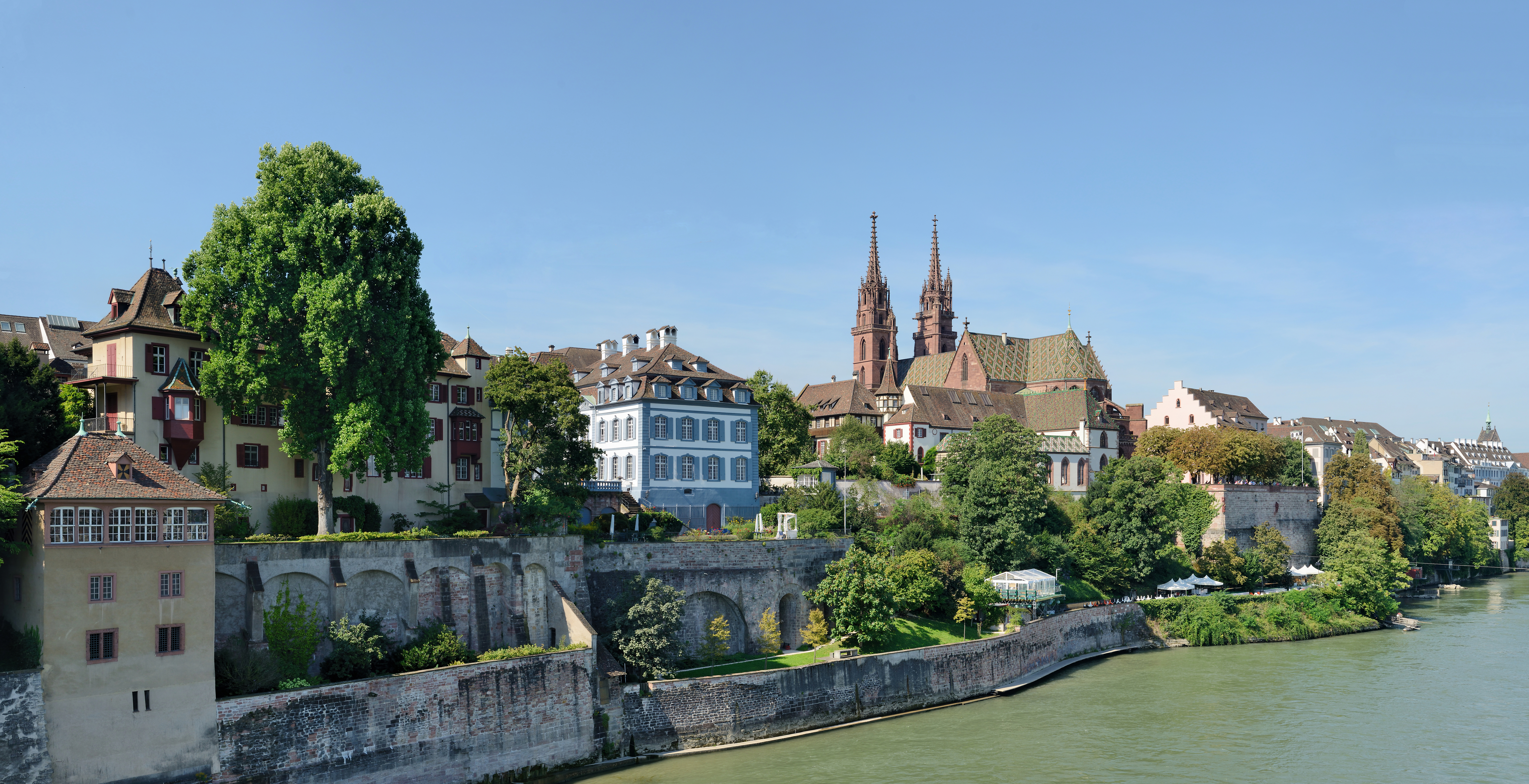
Basel

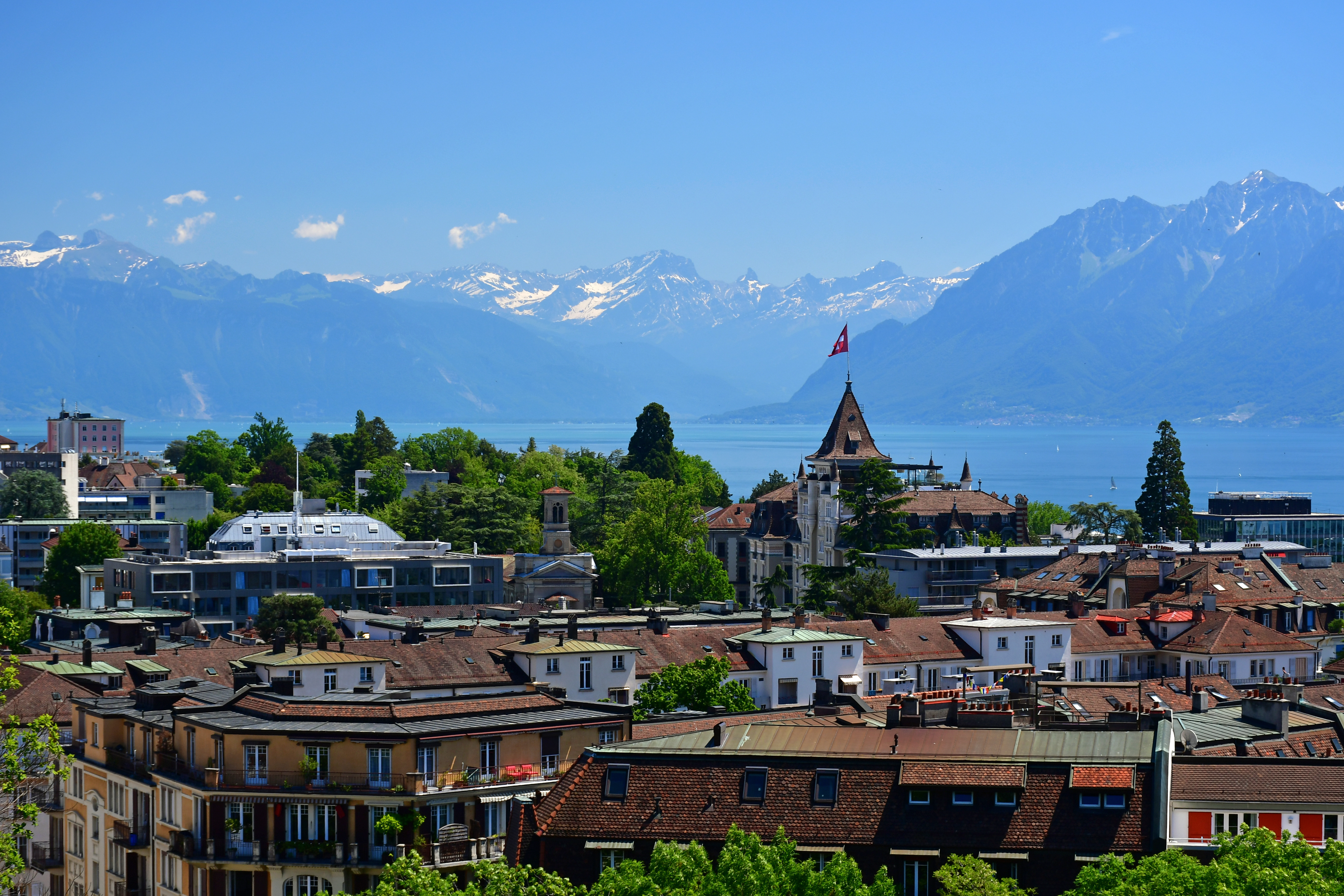
Lausanne

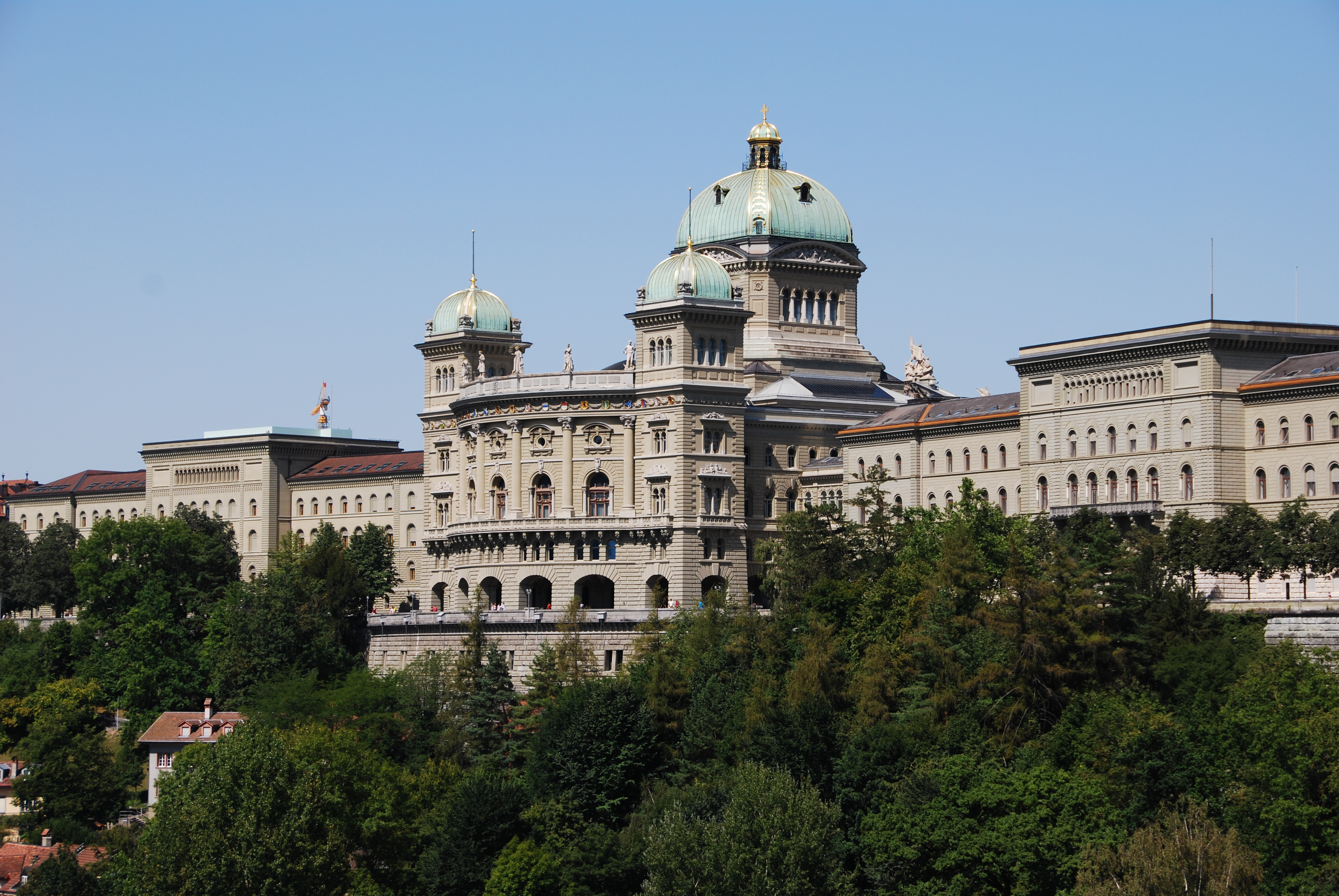
Bern

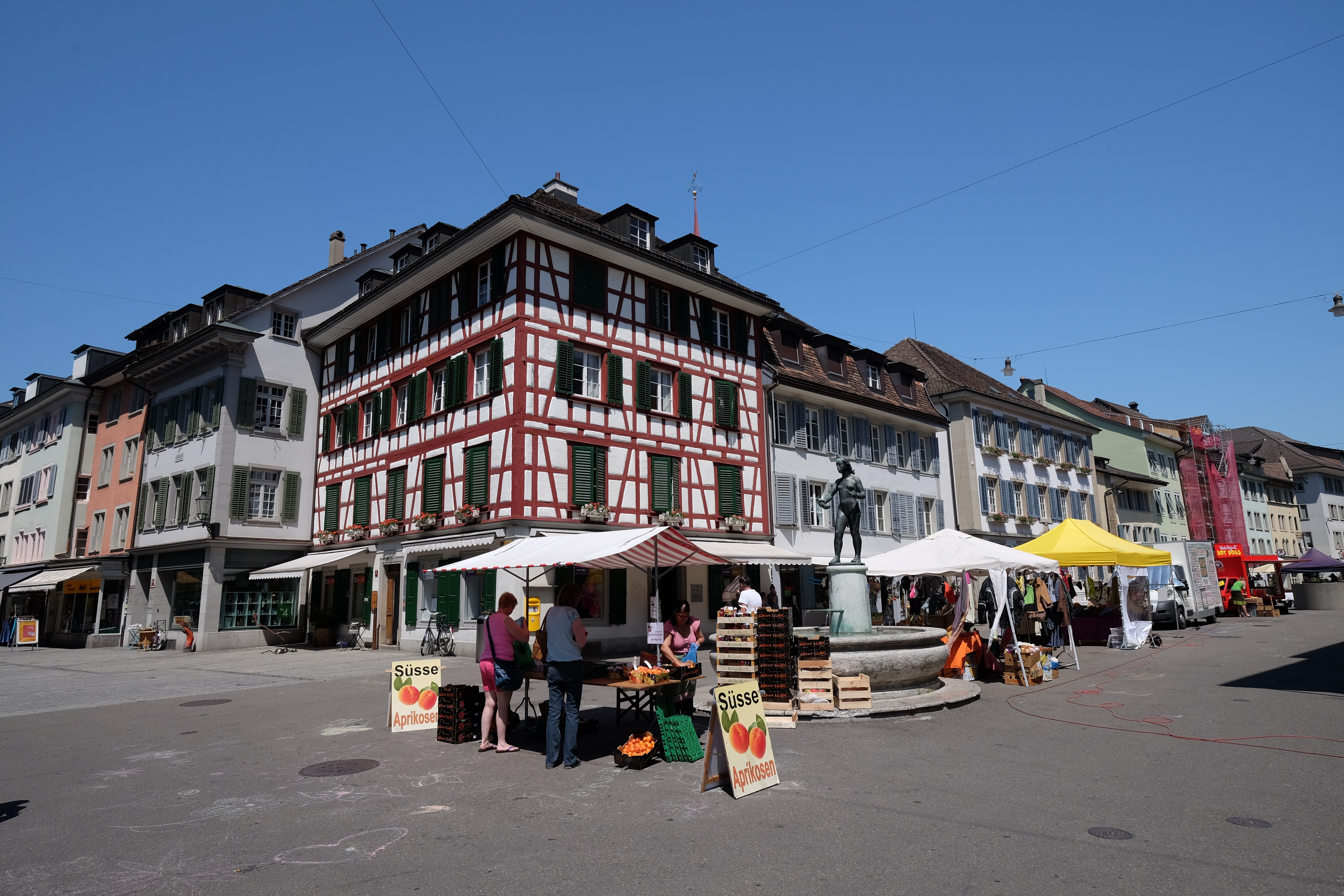
Winterthur

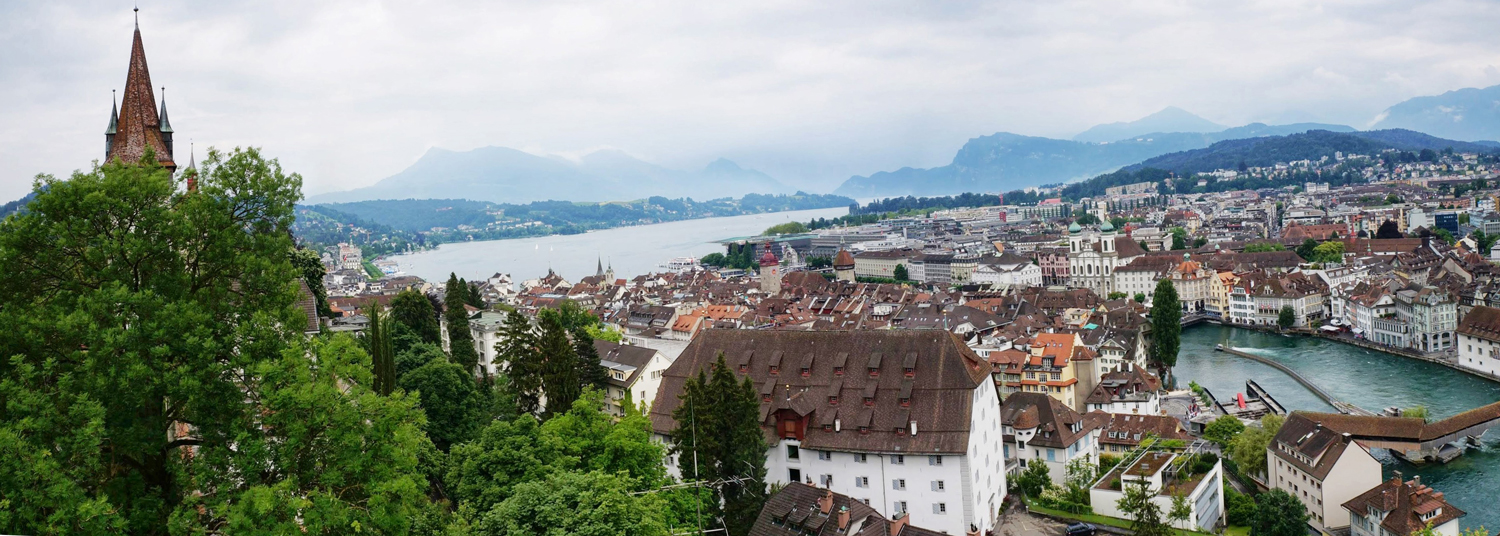
Lucerne

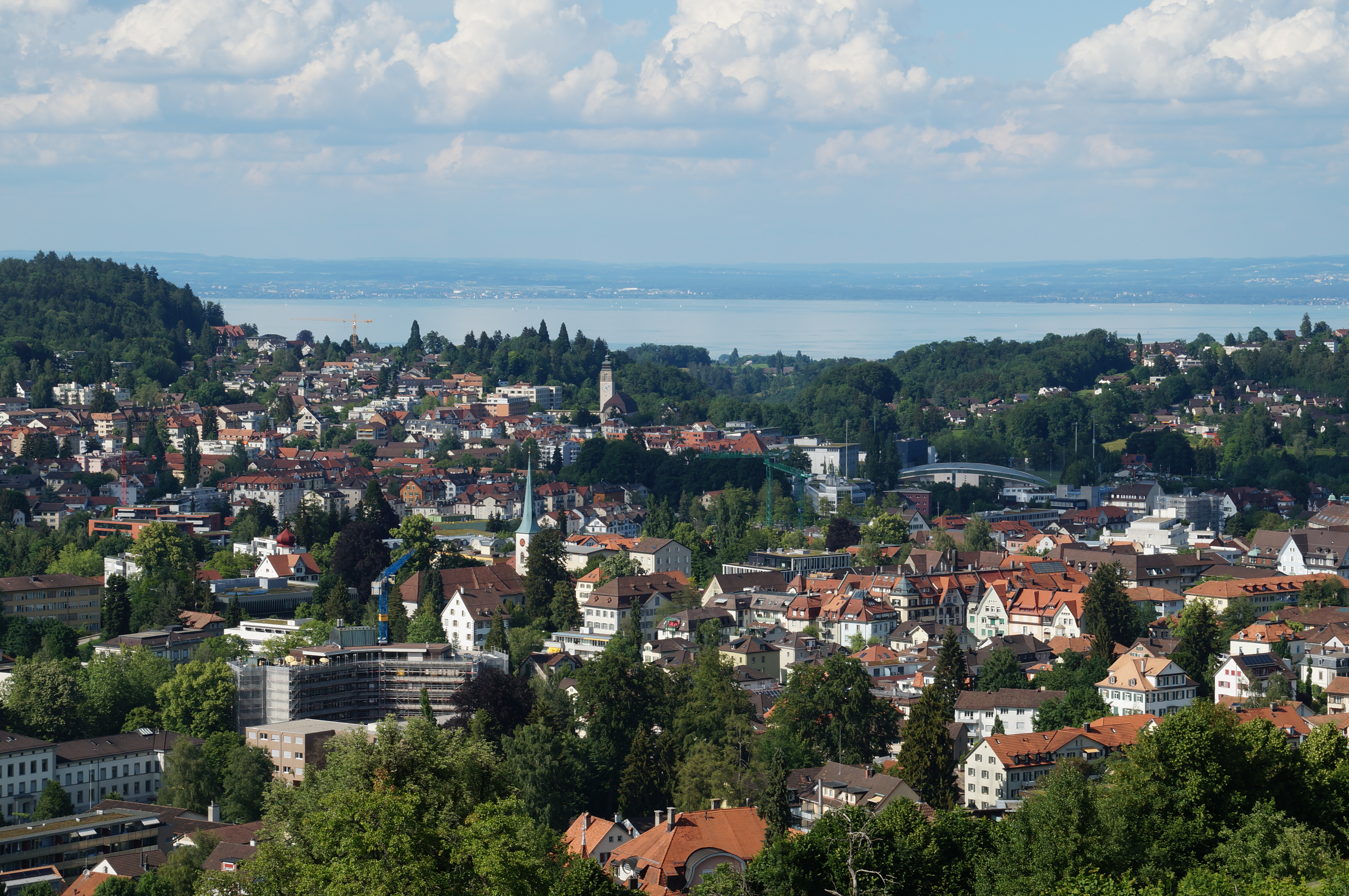
St. Gallen

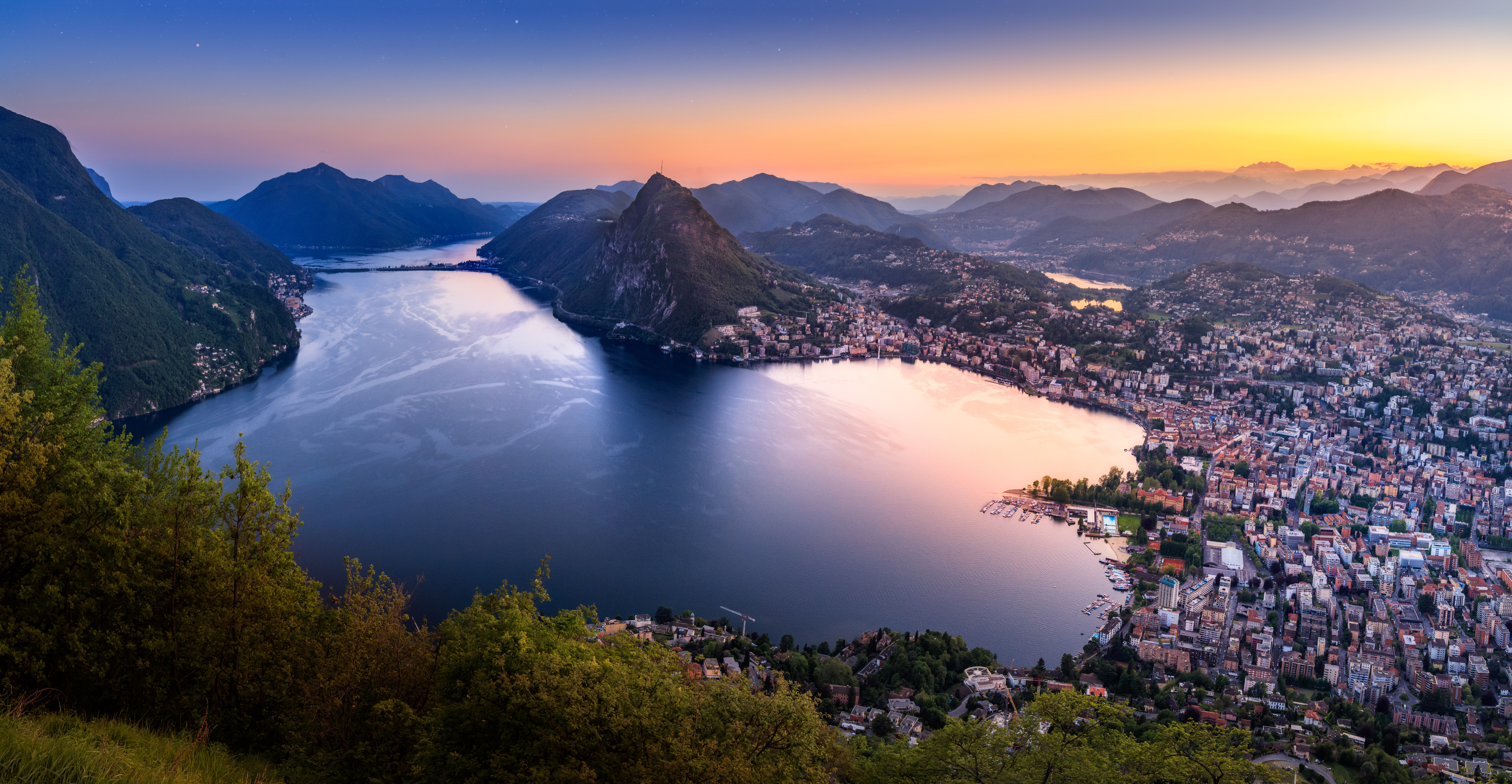
Lugano

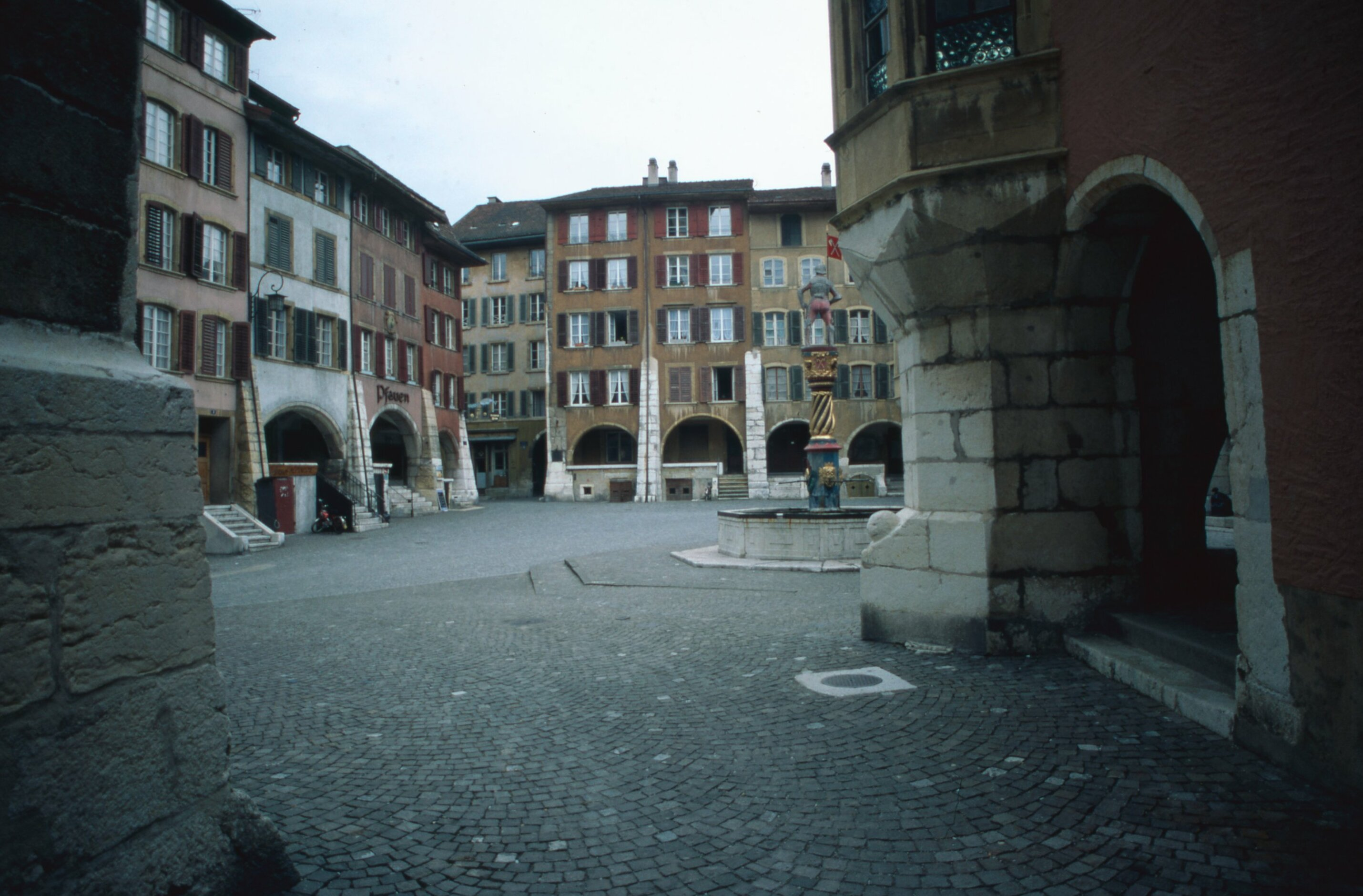
Biel/Bienne

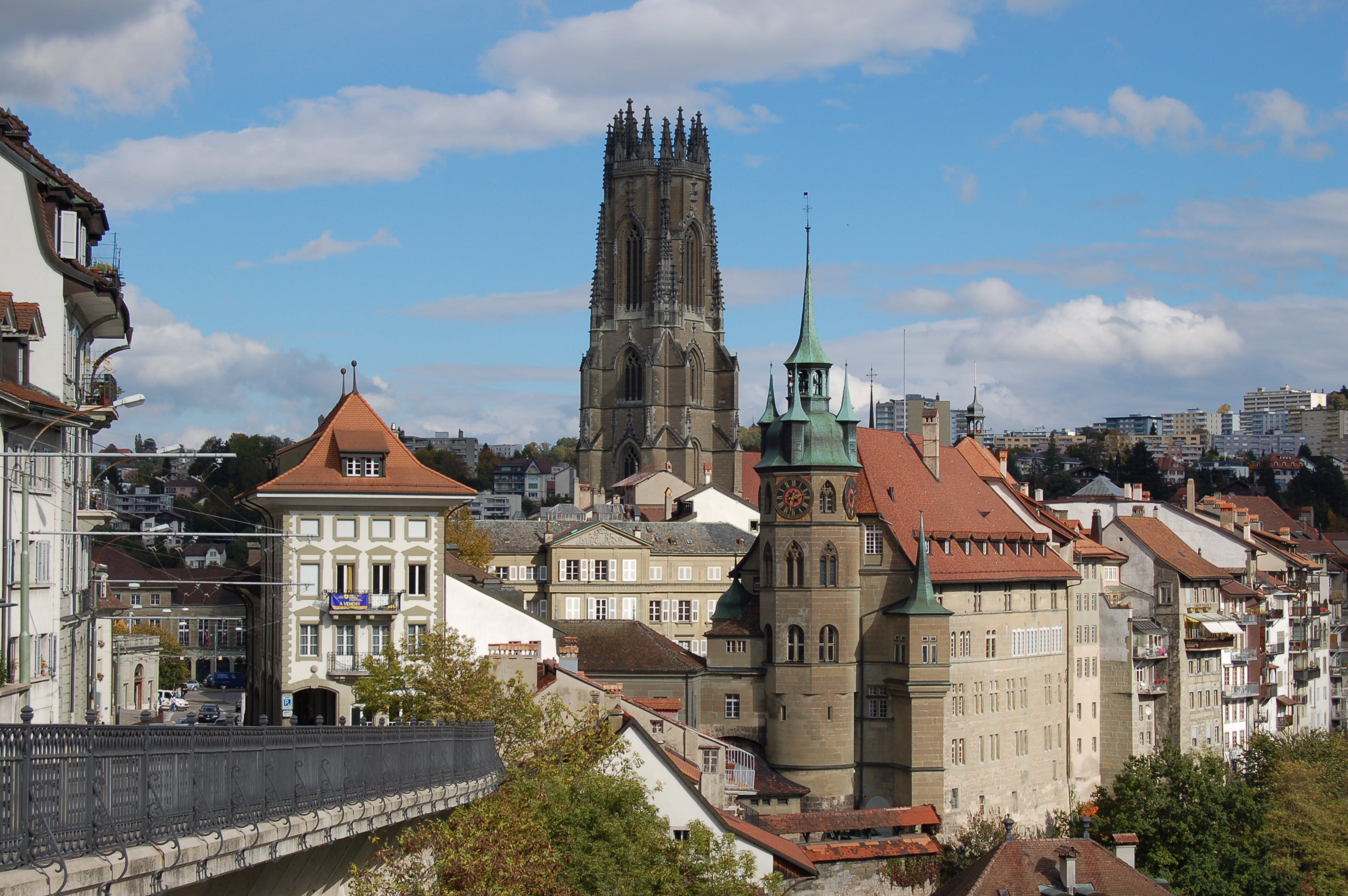
Fribourg/Freiburg

Town	Town (h) or market (m) right, founding date & reference	District	Canton	Population		Agglomeration
Town	Town (h) or market (m) right, founding date & reference	District	Canton	Town proper (2020)	Agglomeration (2015)	Agglomeration
**Aarau**	h 1240–1250	Aarau	AG	21,726	76,636	Aarau
Aarberg	h 1220–1225	Aarberg	BE	4,626		–
Aarburg	h ~1330	Zofingen	AG	8,577	98,535	Olten–Zofingen
Adliswil	–	Horgen	ZH	19,049	1,334,269	Zurich
Aesch (BL) (Note: It considers itself still as a village.)	–	Arlesheim	BL	10,368	541,011	Basel (CH)
Affoltern am Albis (Note: It does not call itself a town.)	–	Affoltern	ZH	12,289	1,334,269	Zurich
Agno	m Roman & Middle Age	Lugano	TI	4,376	151,037	Lugano (CH)
**Aigle**	m 1231	Aigle	VD	10,462		–
Allschwil	–	Arlesheim	BL	21,563	541,011	Basel (CH)
**Altdorf (UR)**	m n.d., c. Late Middle Age	–	UR	9,565	31,734	Altdorf (UR)
**Altstätten**	m	Rheintal	SG	11,938	56,777	Rheintal (CH)
Amriswil	–	Arbon	TG	14,211	25,271	Amriswil–Romanshorn
Appenzell	m	Appenzell	AI	5,793		–
**Arbon**	h first half 13th c.	Arbon	TG	14,950	53,689	Arbon–Rorschach
Arlesheim	–	Arlesheim	BL	9,240	541,011	Basel (CH)
Arosa	–	Plessur	GR	3,162		–
Arth	–	Schwyz	SZ	12,184		–
Ascona	h	Locarno	TI	5,554	55,528	Locarno (CH)
Aubonne	h	Morges	VD	3,235	409,295	Lausanne
Avenches	h	Broye-Vully	VD	4,477		–
Baar	–	–	ZG	24,686	127,095	Zug
**Baden**	h	Baden	AG	19,621	109,255	Baden–Brugg
**Basel**	h	–	BS	178,120	541,011	Basel (CH)
Bassersdorf	–	Bülach	ZH	11,924	1,334,269	Zurich
**Bellinzona**	h	Bellinzona	TI	43,360	52,061	Bellinzona
Belp	–	Bern-Mittelland	BE	11,603	410,894	Bern
**Bern**	h	Bern-Mittelland	BE	134,794	410,894	Bern
Beromünster	m	Sursee	LU	6,661		–
Biasca	m	Riviera	TI	6,094		–
**Biel/Bienne**	h	Biel/Bienne	BE	55,206	104,542	Biel/Bienne
Binningen	–	Arlesheim	BL	15,750	541,011	Basel (CH)
Birsfelden	–	Arlesheim	BL	10,447	541,011	Basel (CH)
Bischofszell	h	Weinfelden	TG	5,907		–
Boudry	h	Boudry	NE	6,193	89,441	Neuchâtel
Bourg-Saint-Pierre	h	Entremont	VS	211		–
Bremgarten (AG)	h	Bremgarten	AG	8,415	1,334,269	Zurich
**Brig-Glis**	m	Brig	VS	13,221	47,041	Brig–Visp
**Brugg**	h	Brugg	AG	12,738	109,255	Baden–Brugg
Buchs (SG)	–	Werdenberg	SG	13,053	27,467	Buchs (SG) (CH)
**Bülach**	h	Bülach	ZH	21,998	1,334,269	Zurich
Büren a.A.	h	Seeland	BE	3,622		–
**Bulle**	h	Gruyère	FR	24,412	31,703	Bulle
**Burgdorf**	h	Emmental	BE	16,583		–
Bussigny	–	Ouest Lausannois	VD	9,603	409,295	Lausanne
Carouge (GE)	–	–	GE	22,536	579,227	Genève (CH)
Cham	–	–	ZG	17,042	127,095	Zug
Châtel-Saint-Denis	h	Veveyse	FR	7,449	84,869	Vevey–Montreux
Chêne-Bougeries	–	–	GE	12,621	579,227	Genève (CH)
Chiasso	h	Mendrisio	TI	7,581	51,668	Chiasso–Mendrisio (CH)
**Chur**	h	Plessur	GR	36,336	58,266	Chur
Conthey	h	Conthey	VS	8,857	84,138	Sion
Coppet	h	Nyon	VD	3,280	579,227	Genève (CH)
Cossonay	h	Morges	VD	4,223	409,295	Lausanne
Croglio	h	Lugano	TI	861	151,037	Lugano (CH)
Crissier	–	Ouest Lausannois	VD	8,727	409,295	Lausanne
Cudrefin	h	Broye-Vully	VD	1,780		–
Cully	h	Lavaux	VD	1,700?	409,295	Lausanne
Davos*	–	Prättigau/Davos	GR	10,832		–
**Delémont**	h	Delémont	JU	12,618	29,527	Delémont (CH)
Diessenhofen	h	Frauenfeld	TG	4,085		–
Dietikon	–	Dietikon	ZH	28,057	1,334,269	Zurich
Dübendorf	–	Uster	ZH	29,907	1,334,269	Zurich
Ebikon	–	Lucerne	LU	14,066	226,091	Lucerne
Échallens	h	Gros-de-Vaud	VD	5,729	409,295	Lausanne
Ecublens (VD)	–	Ouest Lausannois	VD	13,157	409,295	Lausanne
Eglisau	h	Bülach	ZH	5,491	1,334,269	Zurich
Einsiedeln	–	Einsiedeln	SZ	16,247		–
Elgg	h	Winterthur	ZH	4,960		–
Emmen	–	Hochdorf	LU	31,039	226,091	Lucerne
Erlach	h	Seeland	BE	1,386		–
Estavayer-le-Lac	h	Broye	FR	6,208		–
Flawil	–	Wil	SG	10,510		–
**Frauenfeld**	h	Frauenfeld	TG	25,974	24,864	Frauenfeld
Freienbach	–	Höfe	SZ	16,520	1,334,269	Zurich
**Fribourg**	h	Sarine	FR	38,039	105,406	Fribourg
**Geneva**	h	–	GE	203,856	579,227	Genève (CH)
Gland	–	Nyon	VD	13,258	579,227	Genève (CH)
**Glarus**	m	–	GL	12,539	30,367	Glarus
Glarus Nord*	–	–	GL	18,832	30,367	Glarus
Gordola	h	Locarno	TI	4,650	55,528	Locarno (CH)
Gossau (SG)	–	St. Gallen	SG	17,990	165,860	St. Gallen
Grandcour	h	Broye-Vully	VD	967		–
Grandson	h	Jura-Nord Vaudois	VD	3,358	41,079	Yverdon-les-Bains
Greifensee	h	Uster	ZH	5,307	1,334,269	Zurich
Grenchen	–	Lebern	SO	17,577	26,570	Grenchen
Grüningen	–	Hinwil	ZH	3,716	1,334,269	Zurich
Gruyères	–	Gruyère	FR	2,205		–
Herisau	–	–	AR	15,649	165,860	St. Gallen
Hermance	h	–	GE	1,073	579,227	Genève (CH)
Hinwil	–	Hinwil	ZH	11,354	1,334,269	Zurich
Horgen	–	Horgen	ZH	23,090	1,334,269	Zurich
Horw	–	Lucerne	LU	14,211	226,091	Lucerne
Huttwil	h	Oberaargau	BE	5,009		–
Ilanz	h	Surselva	GR	4,797		–
Illnau-Effretikon	–	Pfäffikon	ZH	16,298	1,334,269	Zurich
Interlaken	–	Interlaken-Oberhasli	BE	5,719	23,943	Interlaken
Ittigen	–	Bern-Mittelland	BE	11,430	410,894	Bern
Kaiserstuhl (AG)	h	Zurzach	AG	426	1,334,269	Zurich
Klingnau	h	Zurzach	AG	3,540		–
Kloten	h	Bülach	ZH	20,429	1,334,269	Zurich
Köniz	–	Bern-Mittelland	BE	42,388	410,894	Bern
Kreuzlingen	–	Kreuzlingen	TG	22,390	23,713	Kreuzlingen (CH)
Kriens	–	Lucerne	LU	28,245	226,091	Lucerne
Küsnacht (ZH)	–	Meilen	ZH	14,811	1,334,269	Zurich
**La Chaux-de-Fonds**	h	–	NE	36,915	53,002	La Chaux-de-Fonds–Le Locle (CH)
La Neuveville	h	La Neuveville	BE	3,780		–
La Sarraz	h	Morges	VD	2,595		–
**La Tour-de-Peilz**	h	Riviera-Pays-d'Enhaut	VD	12,068	84,869	Vevey–Montreux
La Tour-de-Trême	h	Gruyère	FR	24,412	31,703	Bulle
Lachen (SZ)	m	March	SZ	9,137	29,124	Lachen
Lancy	–	–	GE	33,989	579,227	Genève (CH)
**Langenthal**	m	Oberaargau	BE	15,544		–
Laufen (BL)	h	Laufen	BL	5,814	541,011	Basel (CH)
Laufenburg	h	Laufenburg	AG	3,659		–
Laupen	h	Bern-Mittelland	BE	3,230	410,894	Bern
**Lausanne**	h	Lausanne	VD	140,202	409,295	Lausanne
Le Grand-Saconnex	–	–	GE	12,378	579,227	Genève (CH)
Le Landeron	h	–	NE	4,642		–
Le Locle	–	–	NE	9,864	53,002	La Chaux-de-Fonds–Le Locle (CH)
**Lenzburg**	h	Lenzburg	AG	11,024	22,188	Lenzburg
Les Clées	–	Jura-Nord Vaudois	VD	187		–
Leuk	m	Leuk	VS	3,991		–
Lichtensteig	h	Toggenburg	SG	1,879		–
**Liestal**	h	Liestal	BL	14,963	541,011	Basel (CH)
**Locarno**	h	Locarno	TI	15,728	55,528	Locarno (CH)
Losone	h	Locarno	TI	6,647	55,528	Locarno (CH)
**Lugano**	h	Lugano	TI	62,315	151,037	Lugano (CH)
Lutry	h	Lavaux-Oron	VD	10,459	409,295	Lausanne
**Lucerne**	h	Lucerne	LU	82,620	226,091	Lucerne
Lyss	–	Seeland	BE	15,763		–
Männedorf	–	Meilen	ZH	11,397	1,334,269	Zurich
Maienfeld	h	Landquart	GR	3,029		–
**Martigny**	h	Martigny	VS	18,291	20,818	Martigny
Meilen	–	Meilen	ZH	14,539	1,334,269	Zurich
Mellingen	h	Baden	AG	5,865	109,255	Baden–Brugg
Mendrisio	–	Mendrisio	TI	14,902	51,668	Chiasso–Mendrisio (CH)
Meyrin	–	–	GE	26,129	579,227	Genève (CH)
Möhlin	–	Rheinfelden	AG	11,088	541,011	Basel (CH)
Monthey	–	Monthey	VS	17,820	32,442	Monthey
Montreux	–	Riviera-Pays-d'Enhaut	VD	26,090	84,869	Vevey–Montreux
Morcote |	h	Lugano	TI	734		–
**Morges**	h	Morges	VD	16,101	409,295	Lausanne
Moudon	h	Broye-Vully	VD	6,101		–
Moutier	m	Moutier	JU	7,348		–
Münchenbuchsee	–	Bern-Mittelland	BE	10,233	410,894	Bern
Münchenstein	–h	Arlesheim	BL	12,128	541,011	Basel (CH)
Münsingen	–	Bern-Mittelland	BE	12,966		–
Muri bei Bern	–	Bern-Mittelland	BE	13,182	410,894	Bern
Murten	h	See	FR	8,244		–
Muttenz	–	Arlesheim	BL	18,020	541,011	Basel (CH)
**Neuchâtel**	h	–	NE	33,455	89,441	Neuchâtel
Neuhausen am Rheinfall	–	–	SH	10,467	69,517	Schaffhausen (CH)
Neunkirch	h	–	SH	2,404		–
Nidau	h	Biel/Bienne	BE	6,943	104,542	Biel/Bienne
**Nyon**	h	Nyon	VD	21,718	579,227	Genève (CH)
Oberwil (BL)	–	Arlesheim	BL	11,167	541,011	Basel (CH)
Oftringen	–	Zofingen	AG	14,455	98,535	Olten–Zofingen
**Olten**	–	Olten	SO	18,496	98,535	Olten–Zofingen
Onex	–	–	GE	18,933	579,227	Genève (CH)
Opfikon	–	Bülach	ZH	20,954	1,334,269	Zurich
Orbe	h	Jura-Nord Vaudois	VD	7,108		–
Orsières	m	Entremont	VS	3,194		–
Ostermundigen	–	Bern-Mittelland	BE	17,758	410,894	Bern
**Payerne**	h	Broye-Vully	VD	10,069		–
Peseux	–	–	NE	5,796	89,441	Neuchâtel
Pfäffikon	–	Uster	ZH	12,174	1,334,269	Zurich
Plan-les-Ouates	–	–	GE	10,601	579,227	Genève (CH)
Porrentruy	h	Porrentruy	JU	6,434		–
Pratteln	–	Liestal	BL	16,621	541,011	Basel (CH)
Prilly	–	Ouest Lausannois	VD	12,360	409,295	Lausanne
Pully	–	Lavaux-Oron	VD	18,694	409,295	Lausanne
**Rapperswil-Jona**	h	See-Gaster	SG	27,483	46,343	Rapperswil-Jona–Rüti
Regensberg	h	Dielsdorf	ZH	459	1,334,269	Zurich
Regensdorf	–	Dielsdorf	ZH	18,568	1,334,269	Zurich
Reinach (BL)	–	Arlesheim	BL	19,260	541,011	Basel (CH)
Renens (VD)	–	Ouest Lausannois	VD	20,834	409,295	Lausanne
Rheinau	h	Andelfingen	ZH	1,287		–
Rheineck	h	Rheintal	SG	3,404	53,689	Arbon–Rorschach
**Rheinfelden**	h	Rheinfelden	AG	13,551	541,011	Basel (CH)
Richterswil	–	Horgen	ZH	13,670	1,334,269	Zurich
Riehen	–	–	BS	21,788	541,011	Basel (CH)
Risch	–	–	ZG	11,212	127,095	Zug
Riva San Vitale	h	Mendrisio	TI	2,626	51,668	Chiasso–Mendrisio (CH)
Rolle	h	Nyon	VD	6,260		–
Romainmôtier	h	Jura-Nord Vaudois	VD	526		–
Romanshorn	h	Arbon	TG	11,327	25,271	Amriswil–Romanshorn
Romont (FR)	h	Glane	FR	5,417		–
Rorschach	m	Rorschach	SG	9,646	53,689	Arbon–Rorschach
Rue	h	Glane	FR	1,537		–
Rüti (ZH)	–	Hinwil	ZH	12,494	46,343	Rapperswil-Jona–Rüti
Saillon	h	Martigny	VS	2,818		–
Saint-Maurice	–	Saint-Maurice	VS	4,518		–
Saint-Prex	h	Morges	VD	5,855	409,295	Lausanne
Saint-Ursanne	h	Porrentruy	JU	700?		–
Sargans	h	Sarganserland	SG	6,213		–
**Sarnen**	m	–	OW	10,514		–
**Schaffhausen**	h	–	SH	36,952	69,517	Schaffhausen (CH)
Schlieren	–	Dietikon	ZH	19,881	1,334,269	Zurich
**Schwyz**	m	Schwyz	SZ	15,435		–
Sembrancher	–	Entremont	VS	1,050		–
Sempach	h	Sursee	LU	4,234		–
Sierre	–	Sierre	VS	16,819	26,132	Sierre
**Sion**	h	Sion	VS	34,978	84,138	Sion
**Solothurn**	h	Solothurn	SO	16,802	78,046	Solothurn
Spiez	–h	Frutigen-Niedersimmental	BE	12,926		–
Spreitenbach	–	Baden	AG	12,126	1,334,269	Zurich
Splügen	m	Viamala	GR	377		–
**St. Gallen**	h	St. Gallen	SG	76,213	165,860	St. Gallen
St. Moritz	–	Maloja	GR	4,945		–
Stäfa	–	Meilen	ZH	14,791	1,334,269	Zurich
**Stans**	m	-	NW	8,171		–
Steckborn	h	Frauenfeld	TG	3,840		–
Steffisburg	–	Thun	BE	15,991		–
Steinhausen	–	–	ZG	10,198	127,095	Zug
Suhr	–	Aarau	AG	10,724	76,636	Aarau
Stein am Rhein	h	–	SH	3,561		–
**Sursee**	h	Sursee	LU	10,361		–
Thalwil	–	Horgen	ZH	18,278	1,334,269	Zurich
Thônex	–	–	GE	14,573	579,227	Genève (CH)
**Thun**	h	Thun	BE	43,476	80,264	Thun
Thusis	h	Viamala	GR	9,453		–
Unterseen	h 1280	Interlaken-Oberhasli	BE	5,760	23,943	Interlaken
Urdorf	–	Dietikon	ZH	10,019	1,334,269	Zurich
Uster	–	Uster	ZH	35,337	1,334,269	Zurich
Uznach	h	See-Gaster	SG	6,519		–
Uzwil	–	Wil	SG	13,284	73,299	Wil (SG)
**Val-de-Travers**	–	–	NE	10,579		–
Valangin	h	–	NE	526		–
Vernier	–	–	GE	34,898	579,227	Genève (CH)
Versoix	–	–	GE	13,281	579,227	Genève (CH)
**Vevey**	h	Riviera-Pays-d'Enhaut	VD	19,752	84,869	Vevey–Montreux
**Veyrier**	–	–	GE	11,861	579,227	Genève (CH)
Villeneuve	h Roman (Penne Locos), 1214 (Villeneuve-de-Chillon)	Aigle	VD	5,834	84,869	Vevey–Montreux
Villars-sur-Glâne	–	Sarine	FR	12,219	105,406	Fribourg
**Visp**	m	Visp	VS	8,060	47,041	Brig–Visp
Volketswil	–	Uster	ZH	18,865	1,334,269	Zurich
Wädenswil	–	Horgen	ZH	21,792	1,334,269	Zurich
Waldenburg	h	Waldenburg	BL	1,124		–
Walenstadt	h	Sarganserland	SG	5,728		–
Wallisellen	–	Bülach	ZH	17,218		–
Wangen an der Aare	h	Oberaargau	BE	2,377		–
Werdenberg	h	Werdenberg	SG	60	27,467	Buchs (SG) (CH)
Weinfelden	–	Weinfelden	TG	11,629		–
Wettingen	–	Baden	AG	21,099	109,255	Baden–Brugg
Wetzikon (ZH)	–	Hinwil	ZH	25,056	1,334,269	Zurich
Wiedlisbach	h	Oberaargau	BE	2,382		–
**Wil (SG)**	h	Wil	SG	24,132	73,299	Wil (SG)
Willisau	h	Willisau	LU	7,752		–
**Winterthur**	h	Winterthur	ZH	114,220	138,252	Winterthur
Wohlen (AG)	–	Bremgarten	AG	16,881	22,621	Wohlen (AG)
**Yverdon-les-Bains**	h	Jura-Nord Vaudois	VD	29,955	41,079	Yverdon-les-Bains
Zermatt	–	Visp	VS	5,820		–
**Zofingen**	h	Zofingen	AG	12,104	98,535	Olten–Zofingen
Zollikofen	–	Bern-Mittelland	BE	10,640	410,894	Bern
Zollikon	–	Meilen	ZH	13,311	1,334,269	Zurich
**Zug**	h	–	ZG	30,934	127,095	Zug
**Zürich**	h	Zurich	ZH	421,878	1,334,269	Zurich
**Bad Zurzach**	m	Zurzach	AG	4,379		–

== See also ==
- List of municipalities of Switzerland
- List of places in Switzerland
- List of postal codes of Switzerland
