= Therwil =

- Municipality
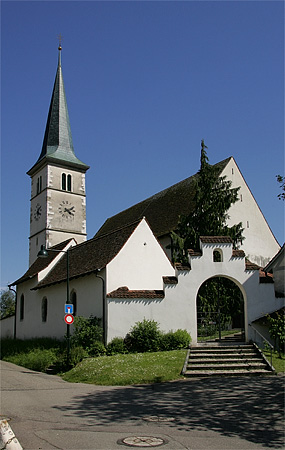

- Coat of arms
- Location of Therwil
- Location within Switzerland Location within Canton of Basel-Landschaft
- Coordinates: 47°30′N 7°33′E
- Country: Switzerland
- Canton: Basel-Landschaft
- District: Arlesheim

Area
  - Total: 7.63 km^{2} (2.95 sq mi)
- Elevation: 306 m (1,004 ft)

Population (June 2021)
  - Total: 10,042
  - Density: 1,320/km^{2} (3,410/sq mi)
- Time zone: UTC+01:00 (CET)
  - Summer (DST): UTC+02:00 (CEST)
- Postal code: 4106
- SFOS number: 2775
- ISO 3166 code: CH-BL
- Surrounded by: Aesch, Biel-Benken, Ettingen, Oberwil, Reinach, Witterswil (SO)
- Website: www.therwil.ch

Therwil (Swiss German: Därwyl) is a municipality in the district of Arlesheim in the canton of Basel-Country in Switzerland.

== Geography ==
Aerial view (1950)

Therwil is located about 8 kilometres south of the city centre of Basel, to which it is connected by a contiguously built-up area, covered by the municipalities of Oberwil, BL, Bottmingen and Binningen.

Therwil has an area, as of 2009, of 7.63 square kilometers (2.95 sq mi). Of this area, 3.52 km^{2} (1.36 sq mi), or 46.1% is used for agricultural purposes, while 1.88 km^{2} (0.73 sq mi) or 24.6% is forested. Of the rest of the land, 2.22 km^{2} (0.86 sq mi) or 29.1% is settled (buildings or roads), 0.01 km^{2} (2.5 acres) or 0.1% is either rivers or lakes and 0.03 km^{2} (7.4 acres) or 0.4% is unproductive land.

Of the built up area, industrial buildings made up 1.4% of the total area while housing and buildings made up 18.6% and transportation infrastructure made up 5.8%. while parks, green belts and sports fields made up 2.5%. Out of the forested land, 22.4% of the total land area is heavily forested and 2.2% is covered with orchards or small clusters of trees. Of the agricultural land, 34.1% is used for growing crops and 7.1% is pastures, while 5.0% is used for orchards or vine crops. All the water in the municipality is flowing water.

== Coat of arms ==
The blazon of the municipal coat of arms is Or, a Quarter sinistre Sable.

== Demographics ==
Therwil has a population (as of June 2021) of 10,042. As of 2008, 13.8% of the population are resident foreign nationals. Over 10 years (1997–2007) the population changed at a rate of 20%.

Most of the population (as of 2000) speaks German (7,640 or 90.6%), with English being second most common (169 or 2.0%) and Italian language being third (164 or 1.9%). There are 123 people who speak French and 6 people who speak Romansh.

As of 2008, the gender distribution of the population was 48.6% male and 51.4% female. The population was made up of 8,203 Swiss citizens (85.6% of the population), and 1,381 non-Swiss residents (14.4%) Of the population in the municipality 1,754 or about 20.8% were born in Therwil and lived there in 2000. There were 1,517 or 18.0% who were born in the same canton, while 3,468 or 41.1% were born somewhere else in Switzerland, and 1,421 or 16.8% were born outside of Switzerland.

In 2008 there were 75 live births to Swiss citizens and 16 births to non-Swiss citizens, and in same time span there were 44 deaths of Swiss citizens and 2 non-Swiss citizen deaths. Ignoring immigration and emigration, the population of Swiss citizens increased by 31 while the foreign population increased by 14. There were 6 Swiss men and 10 Swiss women who immigrated back to Switzerland. At the same time, there were 42 non-Swiss men and 38 non-Swiss women who immigrated from another country to Switzerland. The total Swiss population change in 2008 (from all sources, including moves across municipal borders) was an increase of 20 and the non-Swiss population change was an increase of 80 people. This represents a population growth rate of 1.1%.

The age distribution, as of 2010, in Therwil is; 592 children or 6.2% of the population are between 0 and 6 years old and 1,441 teenagers or 15.0% are between 7 and 19. Of the adult population, 945 people or 9.9% of the population are between 20 and 29 years old. 1,093 people or 11.4% are between 30 and 39, 1,716 people or 17.9% are between 40 and 49, and 1,953 people or 20.4% are between 50 and 64. The senior population distribution is 1,440 people or 15.0% of the population are between 65 and 79 years old and there are 404 people or 4.2% who are over 80.

As of 2000, there were 3,214 people who were single and never married in the municipality. There were 4,394 married individuals, 362 widows or widowers and 464 individuals who are divorced.

As of 2000, there were 3,555 private households in the municipality, and an average of 2.3 persons per household. There were 1,003 households that consist of only one person and 168 households with five or more people. Out of a total of 3,591 households that answered this question, 27.9% were households made up of just one person and 11 were adults who lived with their parents. Of the rest of the households, there are 1,178 married couples without children, 1,134 married couples with children There were 195 single parents with a child or children. There were 34 households that were made up unrelated people and 36 households that were made some sort of institution or another collective housing.

In 2000 there were 1,583 single family homes (or 77.9% of the total) out of a total of 2,031 inhabited buildings. There were 259 multi-family buildings (12.8%), along with 129 multi-purpose buildings that were mostly used for housing (6.4%) and 60 other use buildings (commercial or industrial) that also had some housing (3.0%). Of the single family homes 46 were built before 1919, while 364 were built between 1990 and 2000. The greatest number of single family homes (529) were built between 1961 and 1970.

In 2000 there were 3,705 apartments in the municipality. The most common apartment size was 4 rooms of which there were 1,351. There were 96 single room apartments and 1,286 apartments with five or more rooms. Of these apartments, a total of 3,499 apartments (94.4% of the total) were permanently occupied, while 163 apartments (4.4%) were seasonally occupied and 43 apartments (1.2%) were empty. As of 2007, the construction rate of new housing units was 5.8 new units per 1000 residents. As of 2000 the average price to rent a two-room apartment was about 946.00 CHF (US$760, £430, €610), a three-room apartment was about 1103.00 CHF (US$880, £500, €710) and a four-room apartment cost an average of 1408.00 CHF (US$1130, £630, €900). The vacancy rate for the municipality, in 2008, was 0.22%.

The historical population is given in the following chart:

== Politics ==
In the 2007 federal election the most popular party was the SVP which received 26.11% of the vote. The next three most popular parties were the SP (23.98%), the CVP (21.26%) and the FDP (15.95%). In the federal election, a total of 3,247 votes were cast, and the voter turnout was 49.4%.

== Economy ==
As of 2007, Therwil had an unemployment rate of 2.11%. As of 2005, there were 130 people employed in the primary economic sector and about 21 businesses involved in this sector. 710 people were employed in the secondary sector and there were 64 businesses in this sector. 1,219 people were employed in the tertiary sector, with 219 businesses in this sector. There were 4,354 residents of the municipality who were employed in some capacity, of which females made up 44.0% of the workforce.

In 2008 the total number of full-time equivalent jobs was 1,850. The number of jobs in the primary sector was 56, all of which were in agriculture. The number of jobs in the secondary sector was 762, of which 655 or (86.0%) were in manufacturing and 95 (12.5%) were in construction. The number of jobs in the tertiary sector was 1,032. In the tertiary sector; 210 or 20.3% were in wholesale or retail sales or the repair of motor vehicles, 75 or 7.3% were in the movement and storage of goods, 61 or 5.9% were in a hotel or restaurant, 47 or 4.6% were in the information industry, 43 or 4.2% were the insurance or financial industry, 122 or 11.8% were technical professionals or scientists, 138 or 13.4% were in education and 206 or 20.0% were in health care.

In 2000, there were 1,697 workers who commuted into the municipality and 3,582 workers who commuted away. The municipality is a net exporter of workers, with about 2.1 workers leaving the municipality for every one entering. About 17.7% of the workforce coming into Therwil are coming from outside Switzerland, while 0.4% of the locals commute out of Switzerland for work. Of the working population, 32.3% used public transportation to get to work, and 41.3% used a private car.

== Religion ==
From the 2000 census, 3,219 or 38.2% were Roman Catholic, while 3,046 or 36.1% belonged to the Swiss Reformed Church. Of the rest of the population, there were 53 members of an Orthodox church (or about 0.63% of the population), there were 54 individuals (or about 0.64% of the population) who belonged to the Christian Catholic Church, and there were 231 individuals (or about 2.74% of the population) who belonged to another Christian church. There were 9 individuals (or about 0.11% of the population) who were Jewish, and 179 (or about 2.12% of the population) who were Islamic. There were 18 individuals who were Buddhist, 15 individuals who were Hindu and 11 individuals who belonged to another church. 1,319 (or about 15.64% of the population) belonged to no church, are agnostic or atheist, and 280 individuals (or about 3.32% of the population) did not answer the question.

== Education ==
In Therwil about 3,677 or (43.6%) of the population have completed non-mandatory upper secondary education, and 1,563 or (18.5%) have completed additional higher education (either university or a Fachhochschule). Of the 1,563 who completed tertiary schooling, 62.7% were Swiss men, 25.0% were Swiss women, 7.4% were non-Swiss men and 5.0% were non-Swiss women.

As of 2000, there were 244 students in Therwil who came from another municipality, while 364 residents attended schools outside the municipality.

The BBC reported that in April 2016 Therwil became "the centre of a national debate about Swiss identity" after it exempted two Muslim students from greeting their professors with a handshake, as it is otherwise customary in Therwil for all other students. USA Today further reported that one of the students has "posted material on his Facebook page in support of the Islamic State".

== Sports ==
The local Baseball Team "Therwil Flyers" is one of the oldest baseball teams in Switzerland. In existence for over 30 years, they have won the national baseball championship (NLA) eight times and the softball championships nine times.
