= John Mills (Gloucestershire cricketer) =

English cricketer, born 1848

- Born: 1848; England
- Died: 14 April 1935 (aged 86); Oberwil, Switzerland

John Mills (1848 – 14 April 1935) was an English cricketer who played in only one recorded first-class cricket match in 1870, this being the inaugural first-class match played by Gloucestershire against Surrey at Durdham Down in June 1870. Mills had scored 17 runs during his batting period, with an average of 8.50. During the fielding period, he did not bowl but held one catch.

== Bibliography ==
- Wisden Cricketers' Almanack, several volumes to 1879.
