= International School Basel =

Location
- Main Campus: Fleischbachstrasse 2, 4153 Reinach BL 2, Switzerland; Reinach and Aesch, Baselland, 4153; Switzerland

Information
- Type: Private coeducational International school
- Motto: The only International Baccalaureate (IB) World School in Basel offering three IB programmes for children ages 3-19 in English, and in English/German in Junior School.
- Established: 1979
- Founder: Janet Galli
- Director: Bradley Roberts
- Junior School: Michelle Phillips
- Middle School: Siân Thomas
- Senior School: Ian Hoke
- Staff: 54
- Faculty: 130 approx.
- Grades: PYP1-DP2
- Age range: 3-18 years
- Enrollment: 1100+ approx.
- Language: English and English/German
- Campuses: Reinach Campus, Fiechten Campus, Aesch Campus
- Athletics: Yes
- Sports: Yes
- Mascot: Gus the Dragon
- Annual tuition: CHF 14,390 - CHF 38,000
- Affiliations: CIS, NEASC (USA), IB
- Website: http://www.isbasel.ch

The International School of the Basel Region AG (ISBR AG), commonly known as International School Basel (ISB), is a non-profit international school in the Basel region of Switzerland. It provides education for students aged 3 to 19 (Early Childhood 1 to Grade 12) through International Baccalaureate (IB) programmes.

English is the primary language of instruction, while German is taught as a compulsory subject from Early Childhood through Grade 8. A dual-language German-English pathway is offered within the Primary Years Programme, with plans to extend the pathway into the Middle Years Programme from 2027.

The school serves both international and Swiss students.

== History ==
The school was founded in 1979 by Janet Galli, an American entrepreneur, in response to a demand from expatriate families for English-language education in the Basel region. It began with approximately 15 students in a single facility. As enrolment increased, the school expanded to multiple sites across the region.

In 1995, the school became an authorised International Baccalaureate World School with the introduction of the Diploma Programme (DP). In 2001, it transitioned into a non-for-profit organisation under the name International School of the Basel Region AG and introduced the Middle Years Program (MYP). The Primary Years Programme (PYP) was introduced in 2003 alongside the opening of the Reinach campus.

The Aesch campus opened in 2007 as a purpose-built facility. From 2012, the Fiechten campus has been used for early secondary education.

The school currently educates over 1100 students representing approximately 55 nationalities.

== Campuses ==
ISB operates multiple campuses in the Basel region. Its main campus and administrative headquarters are located in Reinach, Basel-Landschaft. Additional campuses include Fiechten (Reinach) and Aesch.

== Curriculum and Languages ==
ISB is an authorised International Baccalaureate World School offering three IB programmes:

- Primary Years Programme (PYP)
- Middle Years Programme (MYP)
- Diploma Programme (DP)

English is the primary language of instruction. German is taught as a compulsory subject for all students from Early Childhood 1 (EC1) through Grade 8.

=== Dual Language Pathway ===
A dual-language German and English pathway is offered within the Primary Years Programme (PYP). The school has announced plans to extend this pathway into the Middle Years Programme (MYP) from 2027.

=== Additional Languages ===
Additional language options, including French and Spanish, are offered in the Middle Years Programme (MYP) and Diploma Programme (DP).

=== Bilingual Diploma ===
Students completing the Diploma Programme may be eligible for the International Baccalaureate Bilingual Diploma, depending on their programme of study and examination results.

== Accreditation and Authorisation ==
ISB is authorised by the International Baccalaureate Organisation as an IB World School.

- International Baccalaureate Organisation

It is accredited by the Council of International Schools (CIS) and the New England Association of Schools and Colleges (NEASC).

- Council of International Schools
- New England Association of Schools and Colleges

The school is an approved centre for external examinations including the PSAT/NMSQT and SAT, and also serves as an examination centre for the Associated Board of the Royal Schools of Music (ABRSM).[citation needed]

- College Board (SAT/PSAT)
- ABRSM

=== Swiss Authorisation and University Recognition ===
ISB is authorised as a private school in the canton of Basel-Landschaft. Its IB programmes operate independently of the Swiss public education system and are not aligned with Swiss state curricula (Volksschule or Mittelschule). As a result, the school does not award the Swiss Matura/Maturität.

The IB Diploma Programme is recognised by universities in Switzerland and internationally, subject to admission requirements established by national higher education authorities and individual institutions. In Switzerland, recognition is governed by the requirements established by swissuniversities.

== Tuition and Fees ==
ISB charges a one-time registration fee for new students and for returning students after a prolonged absence. Annual tuition fees vary by grade level, ranging from approximately CHF 14,390 to CHF 38,000 for the 2026/27 academic year.
