= Bottmingen Castle =

Castle in Bottminger, Switzerland

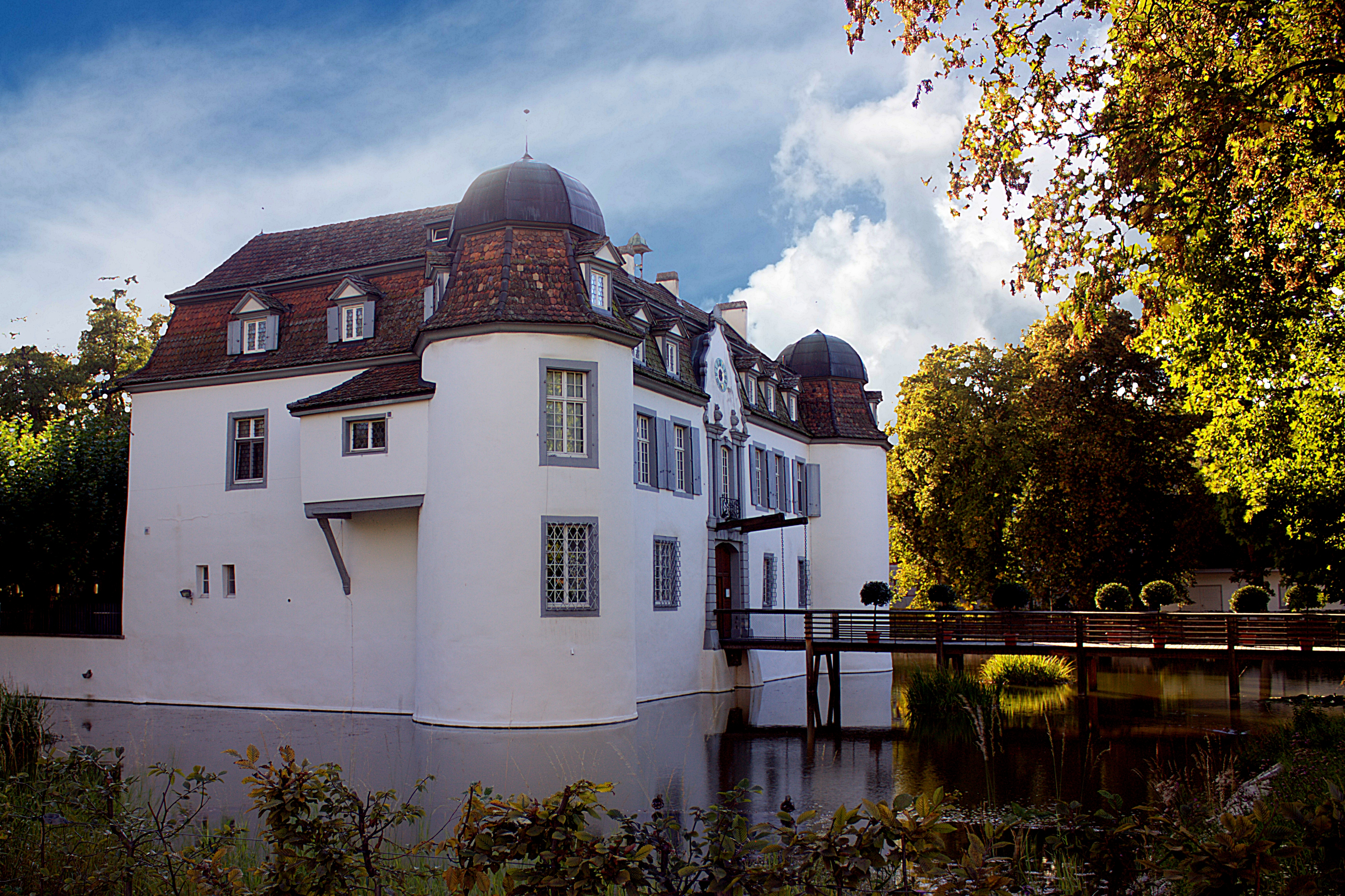

- Location within Switzerland

General information
- Status: Preserved
- Type: Castle
- Location: Bottmingen
- Coordinates: 47°31′25″N 7°34′13″E
- Completed: Before 1363

Bottmingen Castle (German: Schloss Bottmingen) is a castle in the municipality of Bottmingen in the canton of Basel-Land in Switzerland. It is a Swiss heritage site of national significance.

== History ==
The castle was probably built in the second half of the 13th century. Its oldest documented owner was the Kämmerer family, which owned it as of 1363. The castle was rebuilt during the 18th century into an early-Baroque country manor in the French style by Johannes Coster.

== See also ==
- List of castles in Switzerland
