= Arlesheim District =

Coordinates: 47°29′N 7°37′E

Arlesheim District Bezirk Arlesheim
- District
- Country: Switzerland
- Canton: Basel-Landschaft
- Capital: Arlesheim

Area
  - Total: 96.24 km^{2} (37.16 sq mi)

Population (2021)
  - Total: 157,896
  - Density: 1,641/km^{2} (4,249/sq mi)
- Time zone: UTC+1 (CET)
  - Summer (DST): UTC+2 (CEST)
- Municipalities: 15

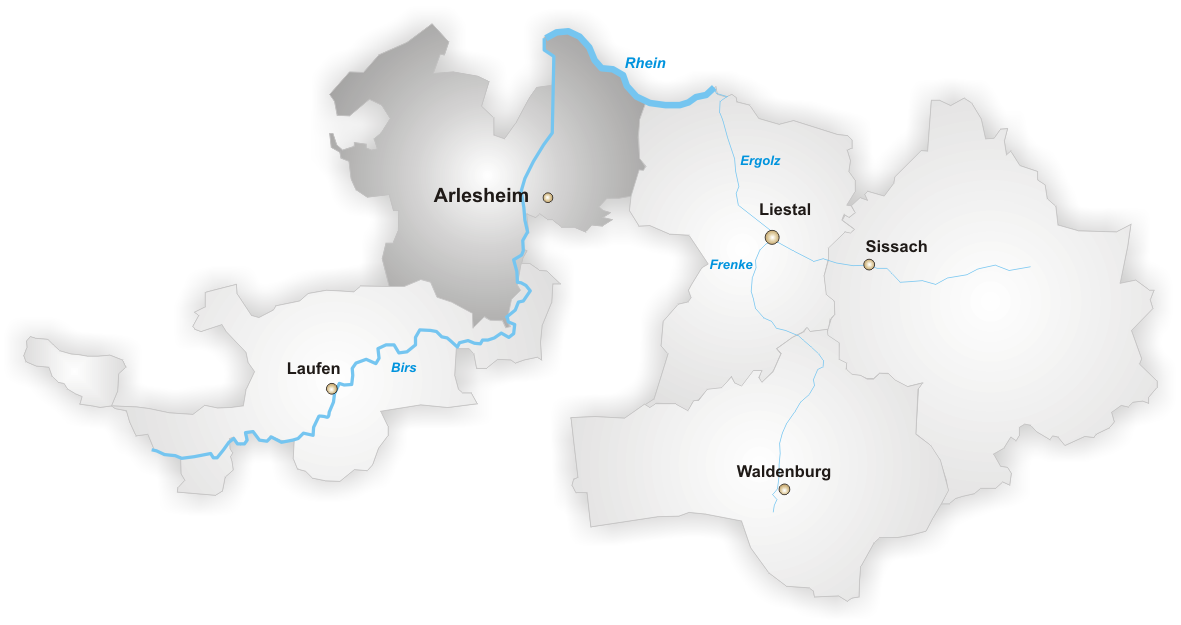

Arlesheim District is one of the five districts of the largely German-speaking canton of Basel-Country, Switzerland. Its capital is the town of Arlesheim. It has a population of 157,896 (as of 30 June 2021).

== Geography ==
Arlesheim district has an area, as of 2009, of 96.24 square kilometers (37.16 sq mi). Of this area, 27.86 km^{2} (10.76 sq mi) or 28.9% is used for agricultural purposes, while 27.82 km^{2} (10.74 sq mi) or 28.9% is forested. Of the rest of the land, 39.17 km^{2} (15.12 sq mi) or 40.7% is settled (buildings or roads), 1.17 km^{2} (0.45 sq mi) or 1.2% is either rivers or lakes and 0.19 km^{2} (0.073 sq mi) or 0.2% is unproductive land.

Of the built up area, industrial buildings made up 4.6% of the total area while housing and buildings made up 21.3% and transportation infrastructure made up 9.3%. Power and water infrastructure as well as other special developed areas made up 1.3% of the area while parks, green belts and sports fields made up 4.1%. Out of the forested land, 27.5% of the total land area is heavily forested and 1.4% is covered with orchards or small clusters of trees. Of the agricultural land, 17.8% is used for growing crops and 7.4% is pastures, while 3.8% is used for orchards or vine crops. All the water in the district is flowing water.

== Municipalities ==
Arlesheim contains a total of fifteen municipalities:

Municipality	Population (30 June 2021)	Area, km^{2}
Aesch	10,368	7.39
Allschwil	21,563	8.92
Arlesheim	9,240	6.94
Biel-Benken	3,577	4.12
Binningen	15,750	4.43
Birsfelden	10,447	2.52
Bottmingen	6,924	2.99
Ettingen	5,538	6.35
Münchenstein	12,128	7.18
Muttenz	18,020	16.64
Oberwil	11,167	7.88
Pfeffingen	2,430	4.89
Reinach	19,260	7.00
Schönenbuch	1,442	1.36
Therwil	10,042	7.63
Total	157,896	96.24

== Demographics ==
Arlesheim district has a population (as of June 2021) of 157,896. As of 2008, 18.5% of the population are resident foreign nationals.

Most of the population (as of 2000) speaks German (123,190 or 87.0%), with Italian language being second most common (4,772 or 3.4%) and French being third (2,704 or 1.9%). There are 132 people who speak Romansh.

As of 2008, the gender distribution of the population was 48.4% male and 51.6% female. The population was made up of 120,288 Swiss citizens (80.5% of the population), and 29,054 non-Swiss residents (19.5%)

In 2008 there were 917 live births to Swiss citizens and 298 births to non-Swiss citizens, and in same time span there were 1,140 deaths of Swiss citizens and 84 non-Swiss citizen deaths. Ignoring immigration and emigration, the population of Swiss citizens decreased by 223 while the foreign population increased by 214. There were 28 Swiss men and 40 Swiss women who emigrated from Switzerland. At the same time, there were 593 non-Swiss men and 573 non-Swiss women who immigrated from another country to Switzerland. The total Swiss population change in 2008 (from all sources, including moves across municipal borders) was an increase of 13 and the non-Swiss population change was an increase of 1,143 people. This represents a population growth rate of 0.8%.

The age distribution, as of 2010, in the Arlesheim district is; 9,085 children or 6.1% of the population are between 0 and 6 years old and 19,004 teenagers or 12.7% are between 7 and 19. Of the adult population, 16,147 people or 10.8% of the population are between 20 and 29 years old. 18,616 people or 12.5% are between 30 and 39, 24,589 people or 16.5% are between 40 and 49, and 30,141 people or 20.2% are between 50 and 64. The senior population distribution is 23,520 people or 15.7% of the population are between 65 and 79 years old and there are 8,240 people or 5.5% who are over 80.

As of 2000, there were 53,006 people who were single and never married in the municipality. There were 72,020 married individuals, 8,242 widows or widowers and 8,331 individuals who are divorced.

There were 21,805 households that consist of only one person and 2,612 households with five or more people. Out of a total of 64,712 households that answered this question, 33.7% were households made up of just one person and 339 were adults who lived with their parents. Of the rest of the households, there are 20,869 married couples without children, 16,599 married couples with children There were 3,388 single parents with a child or children. There were 788 households that were made up unrelated people and 924 households that were made some sort of institution or another collective housing.

As of 2000 the average price to rent a two-room apartment was about 859.00 CHF (US$690, £390, €550), a three-room apartment was about 1070.00 CHF (US$860, £480, €680) and a four-room apartment cost an average of 1355.00 CHF (US$1080, £610, €870).

The historical population is given in the following chart:

== Politics ==
In the 2007 federal election the most popular party was the SP which received 27.33% of the vote. The next three most popular parties were the SVP (25.62%), the FDP (16.93%) and the CVP (13.53%). In the federal election, a total of 50,214 votes were cast, and the voter turnout was 49.3%.

== Religion ==
From the 2000 census, 49,324 or 34.8% were Roman Catholic, while 50,232 or 35.5% belonged to the Swiss Reformed Church. Of the rest of the population, there were 1,560 members of an Orthodox church (or about 1.10% of the population), there were 646 individuals (or about 0.46% of the population) who belonged to the Christian Catholic Church, and there were 4,056 individuals (or about 2.86% of the population) who belonged to another Christian church. There were 266 individuals (or about 0.19% of the population) who were Jewish, and 4,524 (or about 3.19% of the population) who were Islamic. There were 479 individuals who were Buddhist, 867 individuals who were Hindu and 157 individuals who belonged to another church. 24,848 (or about 17.55% of the population) belonged to no church, are agnostic or atheist, and 4,640 individuals (or about 3.28% of the population) did not answer the question.

== Education ==
In the Arlesheim district about 59,226 or (41.8%) of the population have completed non-mandatory upper secondary education, and 24,217 or (17.1%) have completed additional higher education (either University or a Fachhochschule). Of the 24,217 who completed tertiary schooling, 58.4% were Swiss men, 25.5% were Swiss women, 9.6% were non-Swiss men and 6.5% were non-Swiss women.
