= Bottmingen =

- Municipality
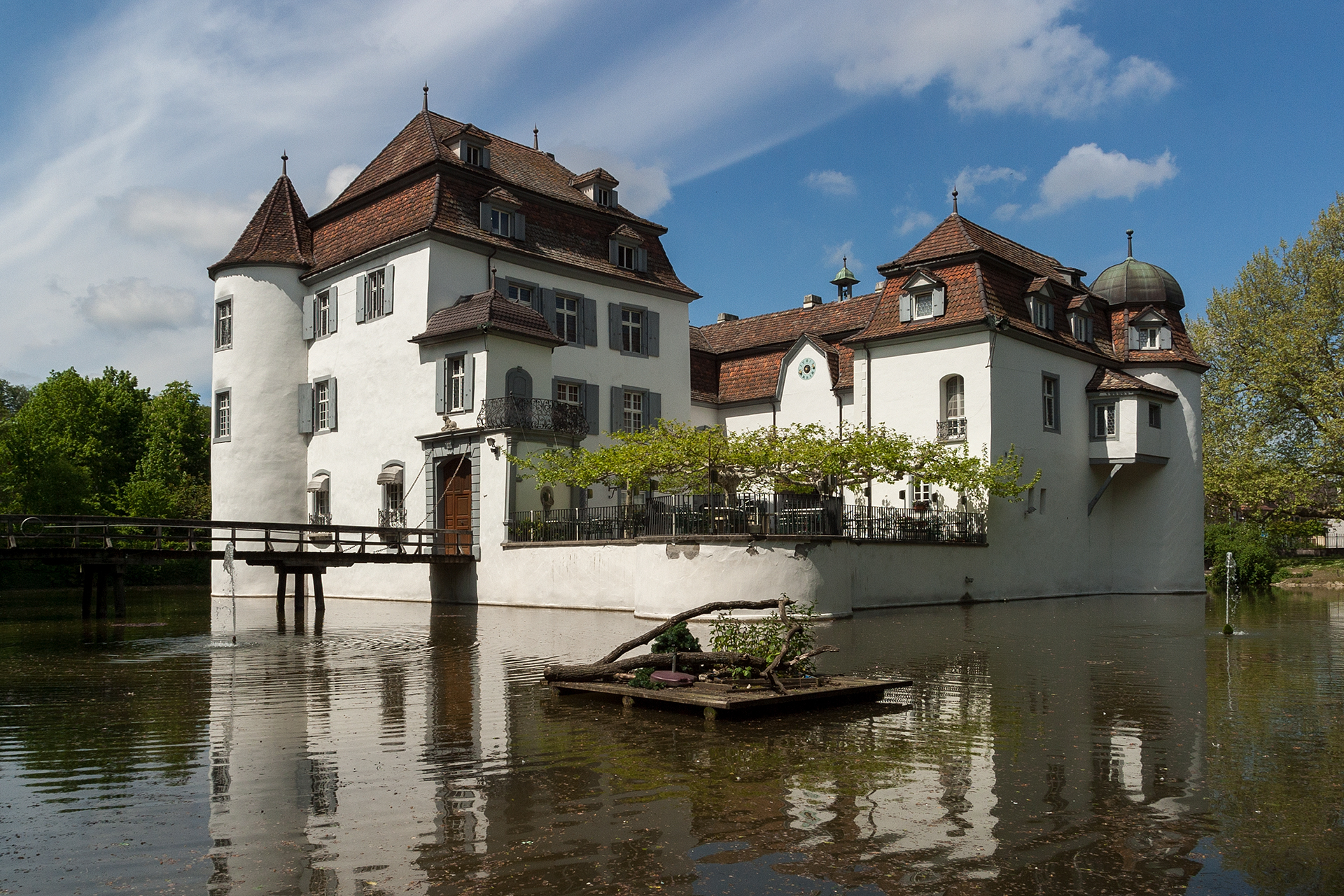

- Coat of arms
- Location of Bottmingen
- Location within Switzerland Location within Canton of Basel-Landschaft
- Coordinates: 47°31′N 7°34′E
- Country: Switzerland
- Canton: Basel-Landschaft
- District: Arlesheim

Area
  - Total: 2.99 km^{2} (1.15 sq mi)
- Elevation: 295 m (968 ft)

Population (June 2021)
  - Total: 6,924
  - Density: 2,320/km^{2} (6,000/sq mi)
- Time zone: UTC+01:00 (CET)
  - Summer (DST): UTC+02:00 (CEST)
- Postal code: 4103
- SFOS number: 2767
- ISO 3166 code: CH-BL
- Surrounded by: Basel (BS), Binningen, Oberwil, Reinach
- Website: www.bottmingen.ch

Bottmingen (Swiss German: Bottmige) is a municipality in the district of Arlesheim in the canton of Basel-Land in Switzerland.

== History ==
Bottmingen is first mentioned in 1246 as Bothmingen.

== Geography ==
Aerial view (1948)

Bottmingen has an area, as of 2009, of 2.99 square kilometers (1.15 sq mi). Of this area, 0.77 km^{2} (0.30 sq mi) or 25.8% is used for agricultural purposes, while 0.55 km^{2} (0.21 sq mi) or 18.4% is forested. Of the rest of the land, 1.61 km^{2} (0.62 sq mi) or 53.8% is settled (buildings or roads), 0.02 km^{2} (4.9 acres) or 0.7% is either rivers or lakes and 0.01 km^{2} (2.5 acres) or 0.3% is unproductive land.

Of the built up area, industrial buildings made up 1.3% of the total area while housing and buildings made up 34.8% and transportation infrastructure made up 12.0%. Power and water infrastructure as well as other special developed areas made up 1.7% of the area while parks, green belts and sports fields made up 4.0%. Out of the forested land, all of the forested land area is covered with heavy forests. Of the agricultural land, 14.0% is used for growing crops and 5.0% is pastures, while 6.7% is used for orchards or vine crops. All the water in the municipality is in lakes.

The municipality is located in the Arlesheim district, along the Birsig river. Until 1837 it was part of Binningen. Over the course of the 19th century, it was absorbed by the agglomeration of Basel.

== Coat of arms ==
The blazon of the municipal coat of arms is described as "Two crossed figures on a red background whose meaning cannot be determined with certainty. It is the seal of the Basel aristocrat Schilling, the second owner of the Bottmingen castle."

== Demographics ==
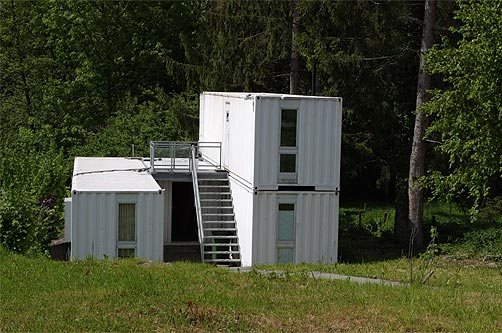
A house made from shipping containers in Bottmingen

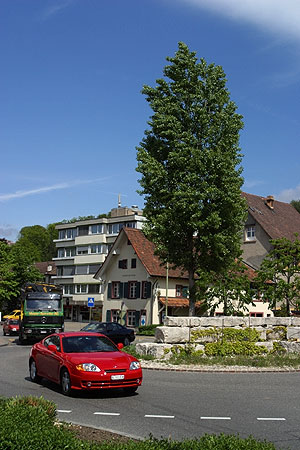
Houses in Bottmingen

Bottmingen has a population (as of June 2021) of 6,924. As of 2008, 19.4% of the population are resident foreign nationals. Over the last 10 years (1997–2007) the population has changed at a rate of 7.5%.

Most of the population (as of 2000) speaks German (4,699 or 85.3%), with English being second most common (152 or 2.8%) and French being third (143 or 2.6%). There are 4 people who speak Romansh.

As of 2008, the gender distribution of the population was 48.1% male and 51.9% female. The population was made up of 4,902 Swiss citizens (80.2% of the population), and 1,211 non-Swiss residents (19.8%) Of the population in the municipality 829 or about 15.1% were born in Bottmingen and lived there in 2000. There were 854 or 15.5% who were born in the same canton, while 2,400 or 43.6% were born somewhere else in Switzerland, and 1,293 or 23.5% were born outside of Switzerland.

In 2008 there were 31 live births to Swiss citizens and 13 births to non-Swiss citizens, and in same time span there were 38 deaths of Swiss citizens and 3 non-Swiss citizen deaths. Ignoring immigration and emigration, the population of Swiss citizens decreased by 7 while the foreign population increased by 10. There was 1 Swiss man and 5 Swiss women who emigrated from Switzerland. At the same time, there were 38 non-Swiss men and 38 non-Swiss women who immigrated from another country to Switzerland. The total Swiss population change in 2008 (from all sources, including moves across municipal borders) was an increase of 54 and the non-Swiss population change was an increase of 74 people. This represents a population growth rate of 2.2%.

The age distribution, as of 2010, in Bottmingen is; 408 children or 6.7% of the population are between 0 and 6 years old and 679 teenagers or 11.1% are between 7 and 19. Of the adult population, 662 people or 10.8% of the population are between 20 and 29 years old. 733 people or 12.0% are between 30 and 39, 970 people or 15.9% are between 40 and 49, and 1,297 people or 21.2% are between 50 and 64. The senior population distribution is 1,060 people or 17.3% of the population are between 65 and 79 years old and there are 304 people or 5.0% who are over 80.

As of 2000, there were 2,083 people who were single and never married in the municipality. There were 2,898 married individuals, 257 widows or widowers and 270 individuals who are divorced.

As of 2000, there were 2,388 private households in the municipality, and an average of 2.2 persons per household. There were 741 households that consist of only one person and 114 households with five or more people. Out of a total of 2,422 households that answered this question, 30.6% were households made up of just one person and 8 were adults who lived with their parents. Of the rest of the households, there are 818 married couples without children, 660 married couples with children There were 138 single parents with a child or children. There were 23 households that were made up unrelated people and 34 households that were made some sort of institution or another collective housing.

In 2000 there were 1,127 single family homes (or 77.0% of the total) out of a total of 1,464 inhabited buildings. There were 193 multi-family buildings (13.2%), along with 108 multi-purpose buildings that were mostly used for housing (7.4%) and 36 other use buildings (commercial or industrial) that also had some housing (2.5%). Of the single family homes 46 were built before 1919, while 111 were built between 1990 and 2000. The greatest number of single family homes (264) were built between 1971 and 1980.

In 2000 there were 2,565 apartments in the municipality. The most common apartment size was 4 rooms of which there were 680. There were 55 single room apartments and 1,088 apartments with five or more rooms. Of these apartments, a total of 2,344 apartments (91.4% of the total) were permanently occupied, while 174 apartments (6.8%) were seasonally occupied and 47 apartments (1.8%) were empty. As of 2007, the construction rate of new housing units was 7.9 new units per 1000 residents. As of 2000 the average price to rent a two-room apartment was about 955.00 CHF (US$760, £430, €610), a three-room apartment was about 1135.00 CHF (US$910, £510, €730) and a four-room apartment cost an average of 1446.00 CHF (US$1160, £650, €930). The vacancy rate for the municipality, in 2008, was 0.36%.

The historical population is given in the following chart:

== Heritage sites of national significance ==
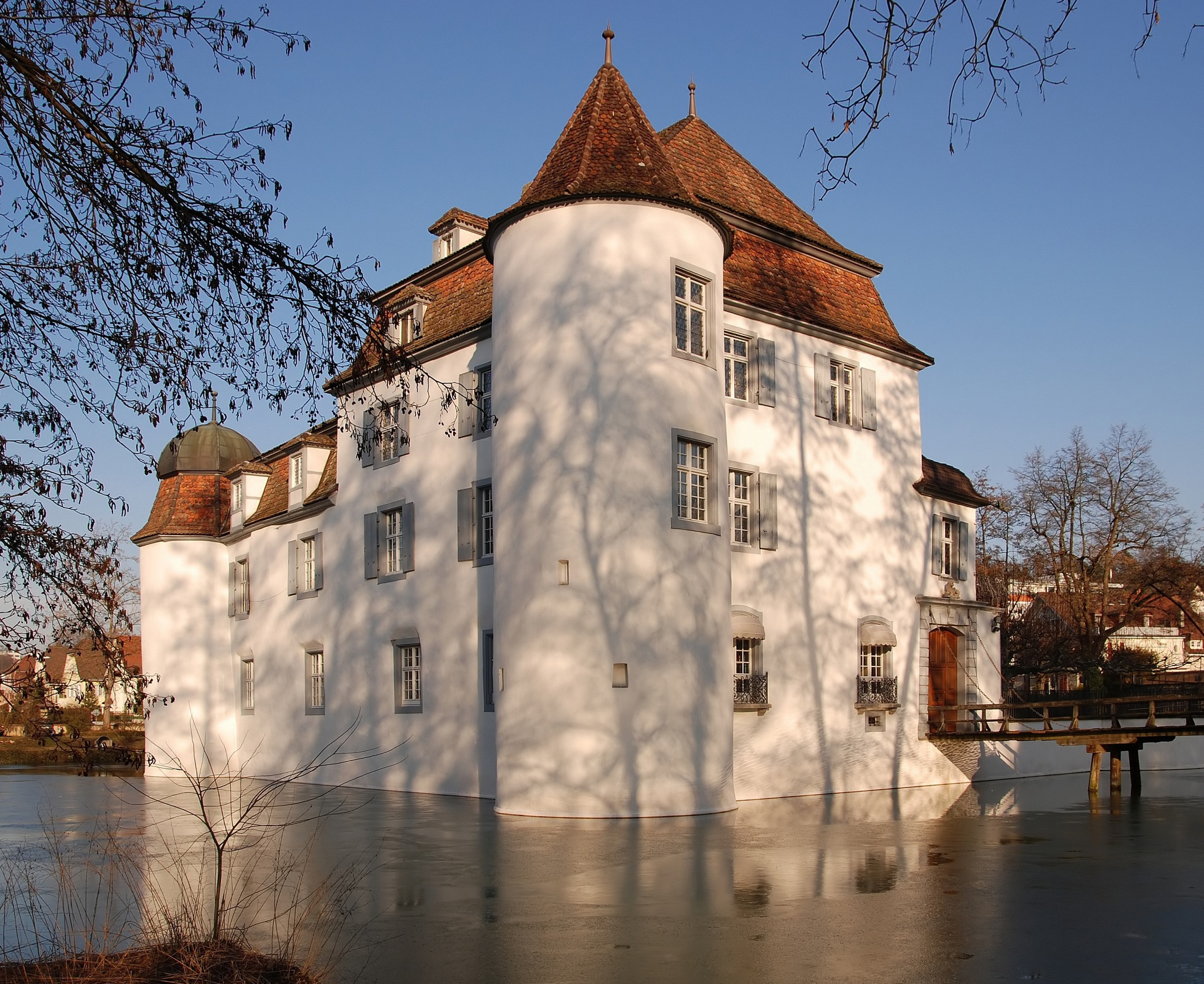
Weiherschloss (Bottmingen Castle)

The Weiherschloss (Bottmingen Castle) is listed as a Swiss heritage site of national significance.

== Politics ==
In the 2007 federal election the most popular party was the FDP which received 24.08% of the vote. The next three most popular parties were the SVP (23.91%), the SP (23.81%) and the Green Party (12.9%). In the federal election, a total of 2,292 votes were cast, and the voter turnout was 55.8%.

== Economy ==
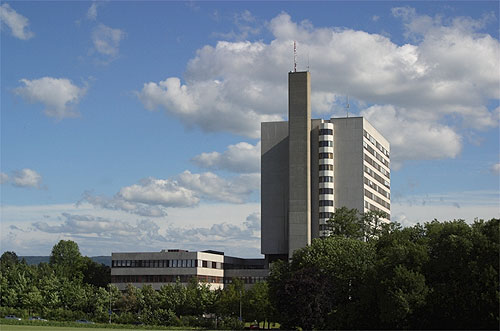
Cantonal hospital Bruderholz, about 18% of the jobs in Bottmingen are in health care

As of 2007, Bottmingen had an unemployment rate of 1.99%. As of 2005, there were 94 people employed in the primary economic sector and about 17 businesses involved in this sector. 195 people were employed in the secondary sector and there were 29 businesses in this sector. 895 people were employed in the tertiary sector, with 138 businesses in this sector. There were 2,773 residents of the municipality who were employed in some capacity, of which females made up 44.5% of the workforce.

In 2008 the total number of full-time equivalent jobs was 1,048. The number of jobs in the primary sector was 21, all of which were in agriculture. The number of jobs in the secondary sector was 206, of which 150 or (72.8%) were in manufacturing and 56 (27.2%) were in construction. The number of jobs in the tertiary sector was 821. In the tertiary sector; 138 or 16.8% were in wholesale or retail sales or the repair of motor vehicles, 7 or 0.9% were in the movement and storage of goods, 56 or 6.8% were in a hotel or restaurant, 49 or 6.0% were in the information industry, 154 or 18.8% were the insurance or financial industry, 86 or 10.5% were technical professionals or scientists, 53 or 6.5% were in education and 150 or 18.3% were in health care.

In 2000, there were 1,847 workers who commuted into the municipality and 2,393 workers who commuted away. The municipality is a net exporter of workers, with about 1.3 workers leaving the municipality for every one entering. About 26.9% of the workforce coming into Bottmingen are coming from outside Switzerland, while 0.3% of the locals commute out of Switzerland for work. Of the working population, 35.2% used public transportation to get to work, and 39.2% used a private car.

== Religion ==
From the 2000 census, 1,620 or 29.4% were Roman Catholic, while 2,303 or 41.8% belonged to the Swiss Reformed Church. Of the rest of the population, there were 52 members of an Orthodox church (or about 0.94% of the population), there were 21 individuals (or about 0.38% of the population) who belonged to the Christian Catholic Church, and there were 121 individuals (or about 2.20% of the population) who belonged to another Christian church. There were 13 individuals (or about 0.24% of the population) who were Jewish, and 122 (or about 2.21% of the population) who were Islamic. There were 10 individuals who were Buddhist, 52 individuals who were Hindu and 7 individuals who belonged to another church. 1,055 (or about 19.15% of the population) belonged to no church, are agnostic or atheist, and 132 individuals (or about 2.40% of the population) did not answer the question.

== Education ==
In Bottmingen about 2,109 or (38.3%) of the population have completed non-mandatory upper secondary education, and 1,411 or (25.6%) have completed additional higher education (either university or a Fachhochschule). Of the 1,411 who completed tertiary schooling, 55.4% were Swiss men, 25.9% were Swiss women, 10.6% were non-Swiss men and 8.2% were non-Swiss women. As of 2000, there were 341 students in Bottmingen who came from another municipality, while 508 residents attended schools outside the municipality.

== Famous residents ==
- Roger Federer – professional tennis player who was born in Basel and currently resides in Bottmingen
