= Reinach, Basel-Landschaft =

Reinach
- Municipality
- Coat of arms
- Location of Reinach
- Location within Switzerland Location within Canton of Basel-Landschaft
- Coordinates: 47°29′N 7°35′E
- Country: Switzerland
- Canton: Basel-Landschaft
- District: Arlesheim

Area
  - Total: 7.00 km^{2} (2.70 sq mi)
- Elevation: 303 m (994 ft)

Population (June 2021)
  - Total: 19,260
  - Density: 2,750/km^{2} (7,130/sq mi)
- Time zone: UTC+01:00 (CET)
  - Summer (DST): UTC+02:00 (CEST)
- Postal code: 4153
- SFOS number: 2773
- ISO 3166 code: CH-BL
- Surrounded by: Aesch, Arlesheim, Basel (BS), Bottmingen, Dornach (SO), Münchenstein, Oberwil, Therwil
- Twin towns: Ostfildern (Germany)
- Website: www.reinach-bl.ch

Reinach (German pronunciation: [ˈraɪnax]; Swiss German: Rynach) is a municipality in the district Arlesheim in the canton of Basel-Country in Switzerland.

== History ==
Reinach is first mentioned around 1168-76 as Rinacho.

== Geography ==
Reinach has an area, as of 2009, of 7 square kilometers (2.7 sq mi). Of this area, 1.84 km^{2} (0.71 sq mi) or 26.3% is used for agricultural purposes, while 1.16 km^{2} (0.45 sq mi) or 16.6% is forested. Of the rest of the land, 3.87 km^{2} (1.49 sq mi) or 55.3% is settled (buildings or roads), 0.06 km^{2} (15 acres) or 0.9% is either rivers or lakes and 0.04 km^{2} (9.9 acres) or 0.6% is unproductive land.

Of the built up area, industrial buildings made up 4.1% of the total area while housing and buildings made up 33.0% and transportation infrastructure made up 11.9%. Power and water infrastructure as well as other special developed areas made up 1.6% of the area while parks, green belts and sports fields made up 4.7%. Out of the forested land, 15.1% of the total land area is heavily forested and 1.4% is covered with orchards or small clusters of trees. Of the agricultural land, 21.1% is used for growing crops and 2.9% is pastures, while 2.3% is used for orchards or vine crops. All the water in the municipality is flowing water.

The municipality is located in the Arlesheim district. The original village grew up along a small stream. At the beginning of the 21st century, it is part of the agglomeration of Basel at the crossing of the Basel-Aesch-Birstal and Dornach-Therwil-Leimental lines.

== Coat of arms ==
The blazon of the municipal coat of arms is Per pale, Argent a Crozier issuant Gules, Azure, three Bezants.

The coat of arms symbolises St. Nicholas who is closely connected to the town.

== Demographics ==
Reinach has a population (as of June 2021) of 19,260. As of 2008, 17.1% of the population are resident foreign nationals. Over the last 10 years (1997–2007) the population has changed at a rate of 4.8%.

Most of the population (as of 2000) speaks German (16,239 or 88.6%), with Italian language being second most common (556 or 3.0%) and French being third (307 or 1.7%). There are 11 people who speak Romansh.

As of 2008, the gender distribution of the population was 48.3% male and 51.7% female. The population was made up of 15,424 Swiss citizens (82.0% of the population), and 3,377 non-Swiss residents (18.0%) Of the population in the municipality 3,366 or about 18.4% were born in Reinach and lived there in 2000. There were 2,730 or 14.9% who were born in the same canton, while 8,021 or 43.8% were born somewhere else in Switzerland, and 3,613 or 19.7% were born outside of Switzerland.

In 2008 there were 101 live births to Swiss citizens and 30 births to non-Swiss citizens, and in same time span there were 162 deaths of Swiss citizens and 10 non-Swiss citizen deaths. Ignoring immigration and emigration, the population of Swiss citizens decreased by 61 while the foreign population increased by 20. There were 9 Swiss men and 9 Swiss women who emigrated from Switzerland. At the same time, there were 49 non-Swiss men and 61 non-Swiss women who immigrated from another country to Switzerland. The total Swiss population change in 2008 (from all sources, including moves across municipal borders) was a decrease of 152 and the non-Swiss population change was an increase of 118 people. This represents a population growth rate of -0.2%.

The age distribution, as of 2010, in Reinach is; 1,033 children or 5.5% of the population are between 0 and 6 years old and 2,377 teenagers or 12.6% are between 7 and 19. Of the adult population, 1,976 people or 10.5% of the population are between 20 and 29 years old. 2,237 people or 11.9% are between 30 and 39, 3,014 people or 16.0% are between 40 and 49, and 3,969 people or 21.1% are between 50 and 64. The senior population distribution is 3,205 people or 17.0% of the population are between 65 and 79 years old and there are 990 people or 5.3% who are over 80.

As of 2000, there were 6,643 people who were single and never married in the municipality. There were 9,557 married individuals, 968 widows or widowers and 1,155 individuals who are divorced.

As of 2000, there were 8,271 private households in the municipality, and an average of 2.2 persons per household. There were 2,708 households that consist of only one person and 282 households with five or more people. Out of a total of 8,376 households that answered this question, 32.3% were households made up of just one person and 23 were adults who lived with their parents. Of the rest of the households, there are 2,880 married couples without children, 2,156 married couples with children There were 428 single parents with a child or children. There were 76 households that were made up unrelated people and 105 households that were made some sort of institution or another collective housing.

In 2000 there were 2,754 single family homes (or 70.8% of the total) out of a total of 3,889 inhabited buildings. There were 692 multi-family buildings (17.8%), along with 325 multi-purpose buildings that were mostly used for housing (8.4%) and 118 other use buildings (commercial or industrial) that also had some housing (3.0%). Of the single family homes 70 were built before 1919, while 403 were built between 1990 and 2000. The greatest number of single family homes (688) were built between 1961 and 1970.

In 2000 there were 8,704 apartments in the municipality. The most common apartment size was 4 rooms of which there were 2,941. There were 224 single room apartments and 2,198 apartments with five or more rooms. Of these apartments, a total of 8,125 apartments (93.3% of the total) were permanently occupied, while 410 apartments (4.7%) were seasonally occupied and 169 apartments (1.9%) were empty. As of 2007, the construction rate of new housing units was 2.1 new units per 1000 residents. The vacancy rate for the municipality, in 2008, was 0.33%.

The historical population is given in the following chart:

== Politics ==
In the 2007 federal election the most popular party was the SP which received 28.12% of the vote. The next three most popular parties were the SVP (26.67%), the FDP (16.43%) and the CVP (13.8%). In the federal election, a total of 6,593 votes were cast, and the voter turnout was 48.8%.

== Economy ==
As of 2007, Reinach had an unemployment rate of 2.23%. As of 2005, there were 42 people employed in the primary economic sector and about 16 businesses involved in this sector. 3,297 people were employed in the secondary sector and there were 135 businesses in this sector. 6,093 people were employed in the tertiary sector, with 671 businesses in this sector. There were 9,536 residents of the municipality who were employed in some capacity, of which females made up 45.3% of the workforce.

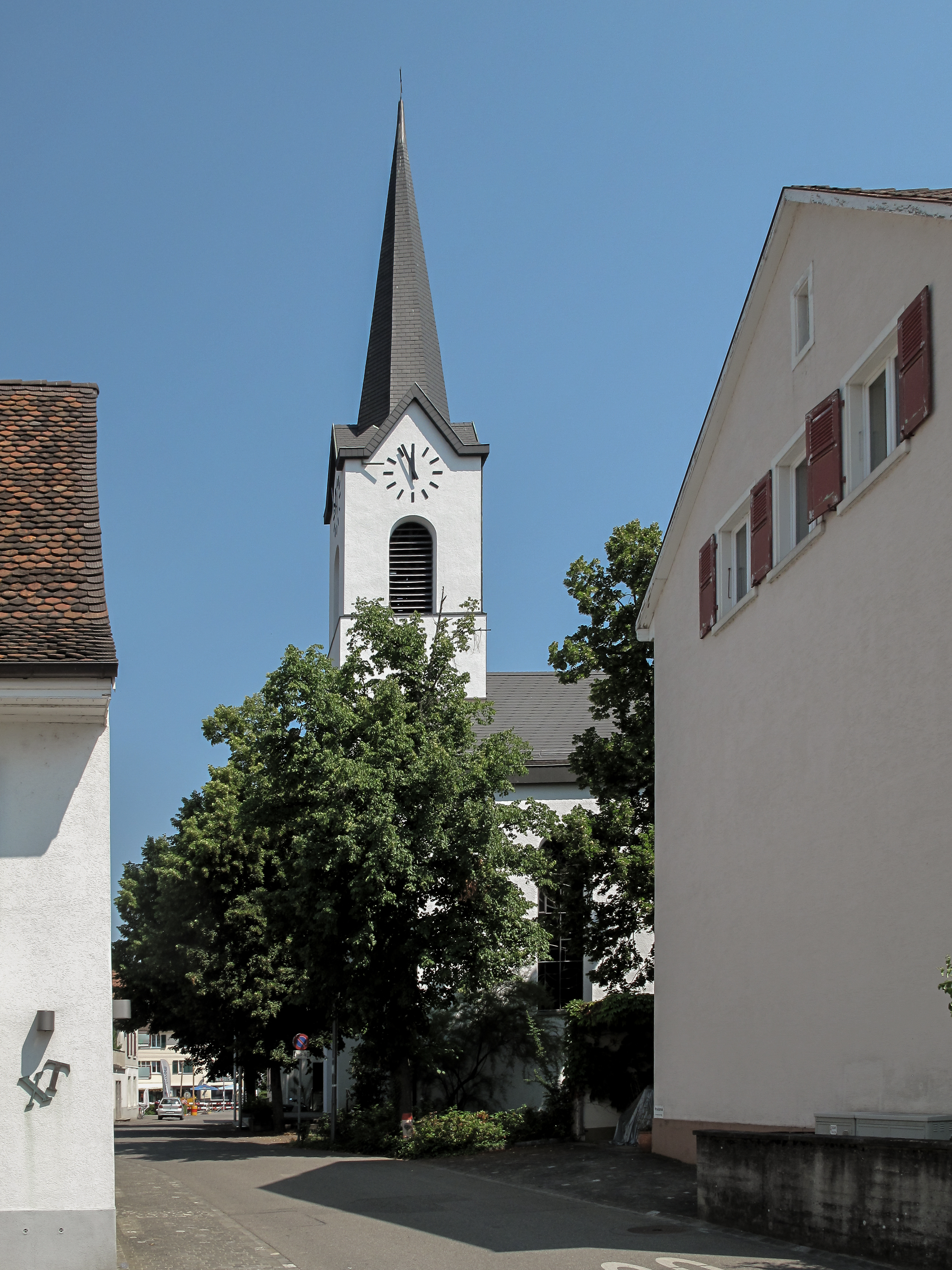
Sankt Nikolaus Church in Reinach

In 2008 the total number of full-time equivalent jobs was 9,388. The number of jobs in the primary sector was 9, all of which were in agriculture. The number of jobs in the secondary sector was 3,527, of which 2,724 or (77.2%) were in manufacturing and 730 (20.7%) were in construction. The number of jobs in the tertiary sector was 5,852. In the tertiary sector; 2,281 or 39.0% were in wholesale or retail sales or the repair of motor vehicles, 256 or 4.4% were in the movement and storage of goods, 199 or 3.4% were in a hotel or restaurant, 353 or 6.0% were in the information industry, 231 or 3.9% were the insurance or financial industry, 631 or 10.8% were technical professionals or scientists, 439 or 7.5% were in education and 826 or 14.1% were in health care.

In 2000, there were 7,994 workers who commuted into the municipality and 7,018 workers who commuted away. The municipality is a net importer of workers, with about 1.1 workers entering the municipality for every one leaving. About 17.6% of the workforce coming into Reinach are coming from outside Switzerland, while 0.1% of the locals commute out of Switzerland for work. Of the working population, 33.5% used public transportation to get to work, and 38.1% used a private car.

== Religion ==
From the 2000 census, 6,822 or 37.2% were Roman Catholic, while 6,114 or 33.4% belonged to the Swiss Reformed Church. Of the rest of the population, there were 184 members of an Orthodox church (or about 1.00% of the population), there were 58 individuals (or about 0.32% of the population) who belonged to the Christian Catholic Church, and there were 494 individuals (or about 2.70% of the population) who belonged to another Christian church. There were 30 individuals (or about 0.16% of the population) who were Jewish, and 597 (or about 3.26% of the population) who were Islamic. There were 71 individuals who were Buddhist, 69 individuals who were Hindu and 15 individuals who belonged to another church. 3,321 (or about 18.12% of the population) belonged to no church, are agnostic or atheist, and 548 individuals (or about 2.99% of the population) did not answer the question.

== Education ==
In Reinach about 8,100 or (44.2%) of the population have completed non-mandatory upper secondary education, and 2,908 or (15.9%) have completed additional higher education (either university or a Fachhochschule). Of the 2,908 who completed tertiary schooling, 60.7% were Swiss men, 24.7% were Swiss women, 9.0% were non-Swiss men and 5.6% were non-Swiss women.

As of 2000, there were 531 students in Reinach who came from another municipality, while 648 residents attended schools outside the municipality.

Reinach holds the International School of Basel, a school where most of the international students go to study, and it is situated on the Tram station Reinacherhof. The city has two of its three campuses : Reinach Campus, and Fiechten Campus.

There are four local primary schools: Fiechten, Surbaum, Aumatt, Weiermatt, Reinacherhof and parts of the Bachmatten campus. The only secondary school is the Bachmatten campus which is made up of two buildings.
