= Types of trams =

Classes of on-street light rail by form or usage

Trams have been used since the 19th century, and since then, there have been various uses and designs for trams around the world. This article covers the many design types, most notably the articulated, double-decker, drop-centre, low-floor, single ended, double-ended, rubber-tired, and tram-train; and the various uses of trams, both historical and current, most notably cargo trams, a dog car, hearse tram, maintenance trams, a mobile library service, a nursery tram, a restaurant tram, a tourist tram, and as mobile offices.

== Passenger levels and floor height ==
=== Low-floor ===
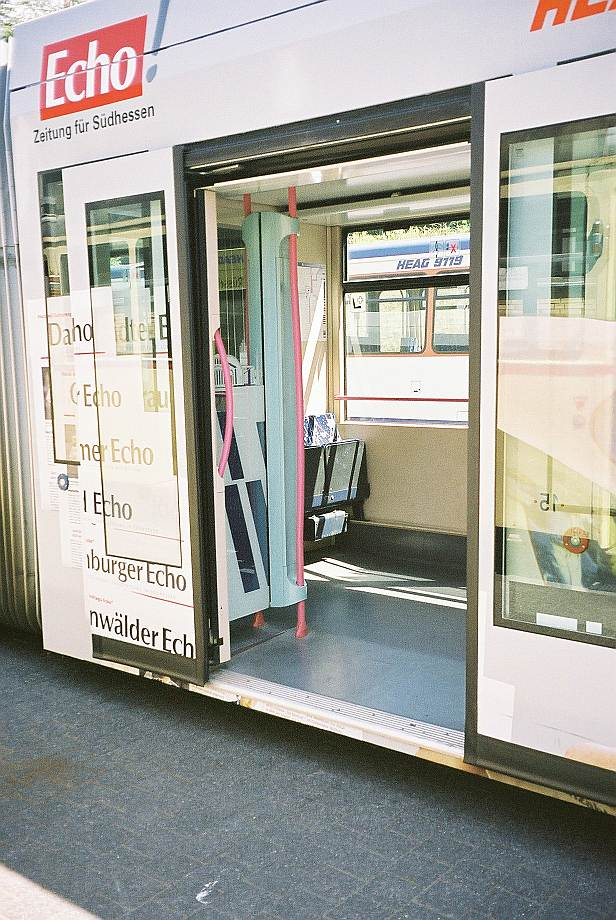
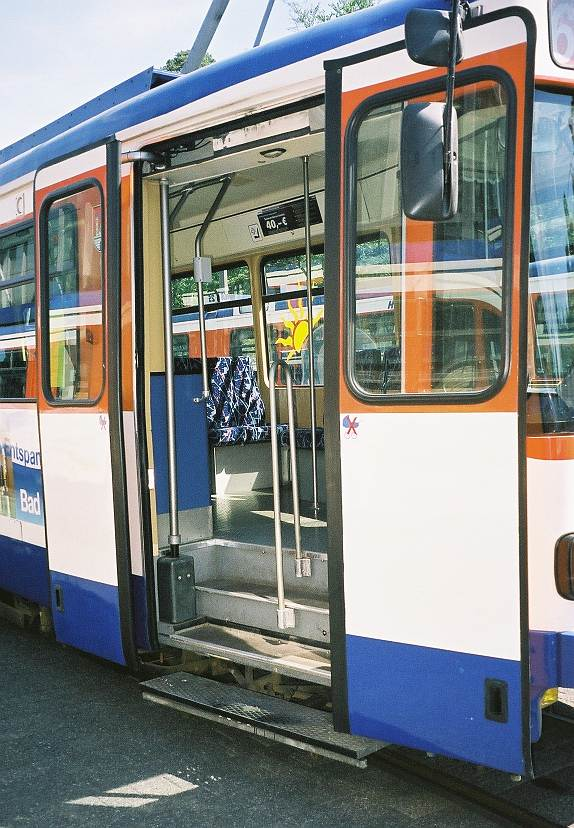
A low-floor tram (left) compared to a "high-floor" tram (right). Since the 1990s manufacturers have attempted to reduce the floor level of trams.

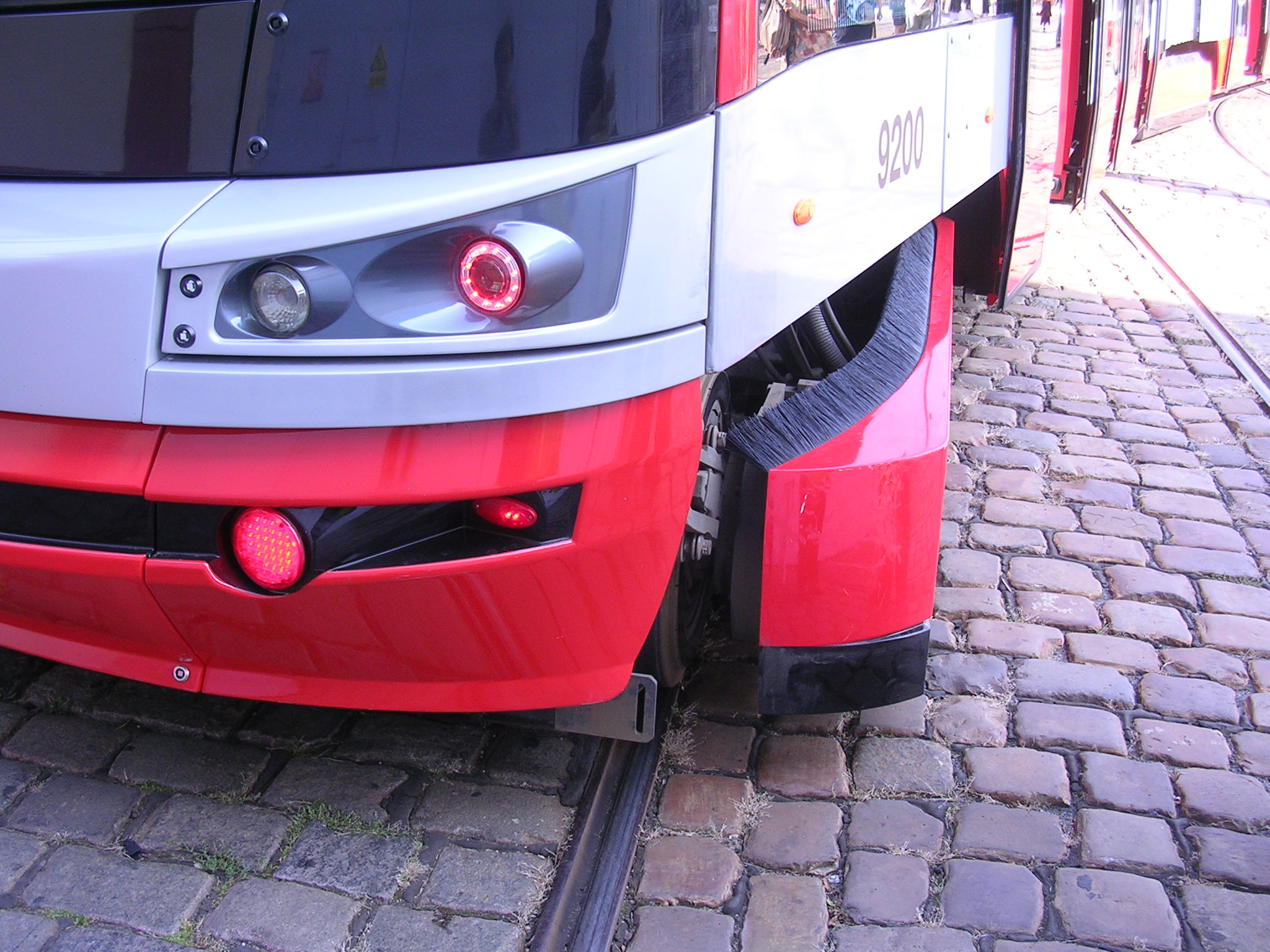
The low-floor Škoda 15T use a pivoting bogie in order to help the tram pivot on curved tracks.

From around the 1990s, light rail vehicles not made for the occasional high platform light rail system have usually been of partial or fully low-floor design, with the floor 300 to 360 mm (11.8 to 14.2 in) above top of rail, a capability not found in older vehicles. This allows them to load passengers, including those in wheelchairs or with perambulators directly from low-rise platforms that are not much more than raised footpaths/sidewalks. This satisfies requirements to provide access to disabled passengers without using expensive wheelchair lifts, while at the same time making boarding faster and easier for other passengers. Passengers appreciate the ease of boarding and alighting from low-floor trams and moving about inside one hundred per cent low-floor trams. Passenger satisfaction with low-floor trams is high. In some jurisdictions this has even been made mandatory since the 1990s, for example by Her Majesty's Railway Inspectorate in Britain and the Disability Discrimination Act in the United Kingdom and other Commonwealth countries.

Various companies have developed low-floor designs, varying from part-low-floor (with internal steps between the low-floor section and the high-floor sections over the bogies), e.g. Citytram and Siemens S70, to one hundred per cent low-floor, where the floor passes through a corridor between the drive wheels, thus maintaining a constant (stepless) level from end to end of the tram.

Prior to the introduction of the Škoda ForCity,, that carried the mechanical penalty of requiring bogies to be fixed and unable to pivot (except for less than 5 degrees in some trams) and thus reducing curve negotiation. This creates undue wear on the tracks and wheels.

Low-floor trams are now running in many cities around the world, including Adelaide, Amsterdam, Bratislava, Dublin, Gold Coast, Helsinki, Hiroshima, Houston, Istanbul, Melbourne, Milan, Prague, Sydney, Lviv, Warsaw and many others.

The Ultra-Low Floor or (ULF) tram is a type of low-floor tram operating in Vienna, Austria, as of 1997 and in Oradea, Romania, with the lowest floor-height of any such vehicle. In contrast to other low-floor trams, the floor in the interior of ULF is at sidewalk height (about 18 cm or 7 inches above the road surface), which makes access to trams easy for passengers in wheelchairs or with baby carriages. This configuration required a new undercarriage. The axles had to be replaced by a complicated electronic steering of the traction motors. Auxiliary devices are installed under the car's roof.

Most low-floor trams carry the mechanical penalty of requiring bogies to be fixed and unable to pivot. This creates undue wear on the tracks and wheels and reduces the speed at which a tram can drive through a curve. Some manufacturers such as Alstom deal with the issue by introducing partially high floor trams. Others, such as Škoda, developed pivoting bogies at the ends and with jacobs bogies between the articulations for the Škoda 15 T, but this solution proved expensive.

=== Double-decker ===
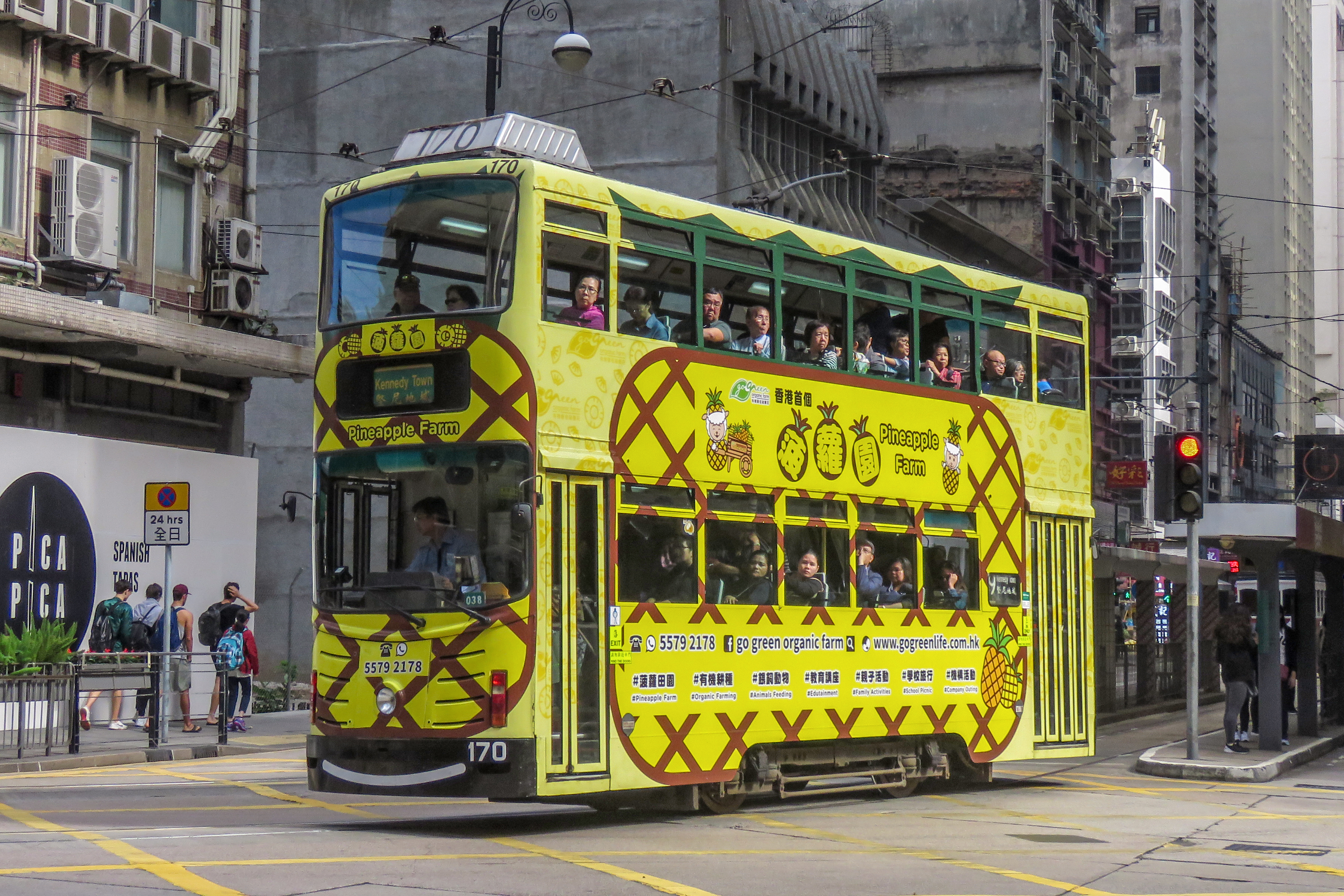
Hong Kong Tramways fleet is entirely made up of double-decker trams.

A double-decker tram is a tram that has two levels. Some double-decker trams have open tops. The earliest double-deck trams were horse drawn. The first electric double-deck trams were those built for the Blackpool Tramway in 1885, one of which survives at the National Tramway Museum.

Double decker trams were commonplace in Great Britain and Dublin in Ireland before most tramways were torn up in the 1950s and 1960s. New York City's New York Railways experimented in 1912 with a Brill double deck Hedley-Doyle stepless centre entrance car, nicknamed the "Broadway Battleship", a term that spread to other large streetcars. Hobart, Tasmania, Australia made extensive use of double decker trams. The most unusual double-decker tram used to run between the isolated Western Australian outback town of Leonora and the nearby settlement of Gwalia.

Double decker trams still operate in Alexandria, Blackpool, Hong Kong, Dubai and Oranjestad.

=== Drop-centre ===
Many early 20th century trams used a lowered central section between the bogies (trucks). This made passenger access easier, reducing the number of steps required to reach the inside of the vehicle. These cars were frequently referred to as "drop-centres". It is believed that the design first originated in Christchurch, New Zealand, in 1906 when Boon & Co Ltd. built twenty-six such trams in three series. A number of these trams have been preserved. They were a favored design in Australia and New Zealand, with at least 780 such tramcars being built for use in Melbourne alone. Trams built since the 1970s have had conventional high or low floors.

== Articulation ==
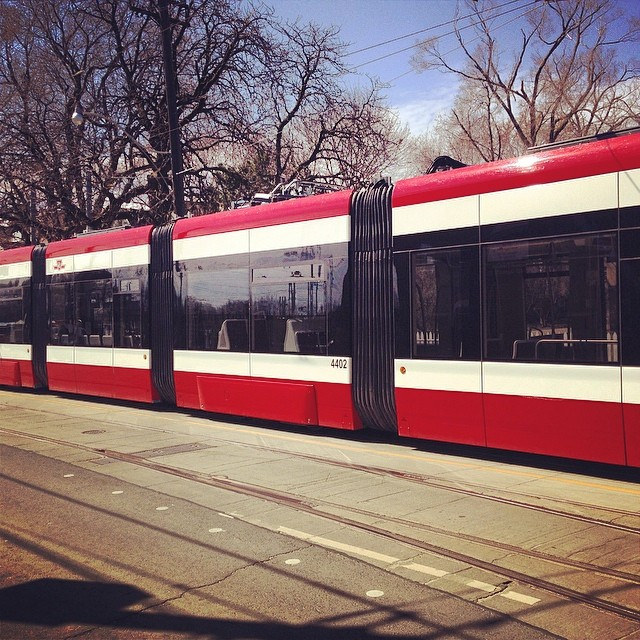
Articulated trams are made up of multiple body sections, connected by flexible joints.

Articulated trams –like articulated buses– have increased passenger capacity. In practice, these trams can be up to 56 metres (184 ft) long (such as CAF Urbos 3 in Budapest, Hungary), while a regular tram is much shorter. With this CAF design, the articulation is suspended between carbody sections; the wheelsets under the supporting carbodies have a very small pivoting capacity. This type is also used with the Alstom Citadis series, the Siemens Combino and several former types of Bombardier. Theoretically, trams may be up to 72 metres (236 ft) long and carry 510 passengers at a comfortable 4 passengers/m^{2}; at crush loadings this would be even higher.

An articulated tram may be low-floor variety or high-floor (regular) variety. In the Škoda ForCity, which is the world's first 100% low floor tram with pivoting bogies, a Jacobs bogie supports the articulation between the two or more carbody sections. The articulated Stadler TINA also features a 100% low floor tram with pivoting bogies, but without the use of Jacobs bogies.

=== History ===
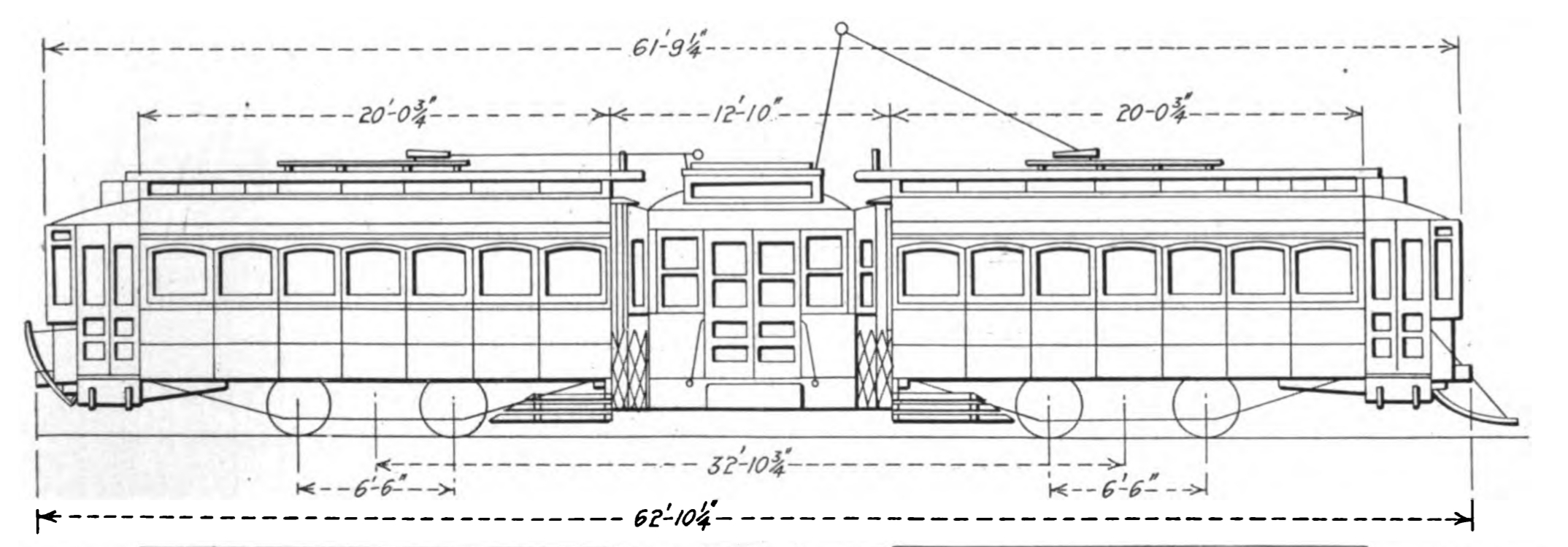
Drawing of a BERy car (Boston, United States)

The articulated tram was invented and first used by the Boston Elevated Railway in 1912–13 at a total length of about 18.8 meters long (61.7 ft), these trams were called "two rooms and a bath". Each pioneering example of the three-section articulated tram car, had two body sections with fixed wheelsets, connected by flexible joints and a suspended midsection.

Italian engineer Mario Urbinati designed one of the first trams with a Jacobs bogie, the first prototype was finished in 1938. The twin-section articulated tram car, was connected by flexible joints and a round pivoting platform. This so called "Urbinati carousel" paved the way for the articulated tram in Europe. Some of these trams from the 1940s are still in use in Rome.

=== Short-articulated tram ===
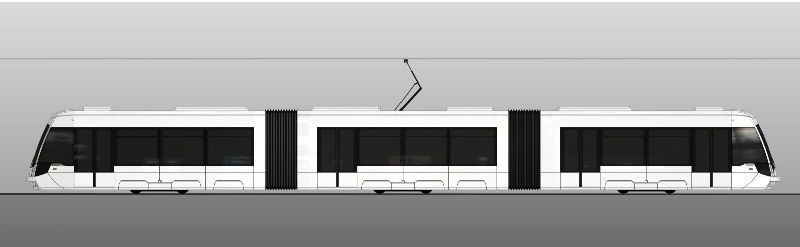
Three section tram with the wheels centred.

A short-articulated tram entering a curve.

A short-articulated tram (German Kurzgelenkwagen) is a type of articulated tram. This tram type is carried on a single bogie in the center of each section. These car sections are directly linked by a pivoting joint (articulation) and enclosed by protective bellows inside and outside and a cover plate on the floor. The sections may be controlled by rods and/or hydraulics. Alternatively with low-floor trams, this type is also termed Einzelgelenkwagen; and sometimes directly translated into single-articulated tram. This term is the opposite of the multi-articulated tram.

The need to build large tramcars can be seen in the development from two-axle cars to four-axle cars with two bogies. These four-axle cars were mostly 13 m to 15 m long; longer bodies would limit the usability in curves. Bigger trams needed an articulation resulting in six-axle trams with a Jacobs bogie, and around the same time, three section two-rooms-and-a-bath cars appeared. The first –with their three pivoting bogies– were expensive to build; the latter –having only two fixed bogies– were uncomfortable and caused additional wear of the rails. To cope with these problems, the "short-articulated tram" was developed. The German word kurz (meaning "short") was applied because the inititial tramtypes were shorter than the six-axle cars. Over time, the "short-articulated tram" grew to about 20 m, almost the length of six-axle cars.

==== History ====
An early attempt to link sections directly resulted in the RETM tram 501/502. This tram with four fixed axles only ran from 1924 to 1928. Due to its poor running characteristics, initially few models were replicated: a single test tram, such as the Ce160/162, was put on rails in Bern, Switzerland. In Munich four four-axle trams were coupled in pairs in 1936/37, resulting in two eight-axle trams.

==== Bremen Type ====
A prototype of this concept was built in Bremen in 1959. These following series were locally called GT4, chronologically supplemented by a letter from the alphabet: GT4a through GT4f. Series a, b, and c were built in the 1960s, while series d, e, and f were a further development and were built in the 1970s. These four-axle trams have better running characteristics than the pre-war articulated four-axle trams in other cities, because they are equipped with bogies instead of a fixed truck.

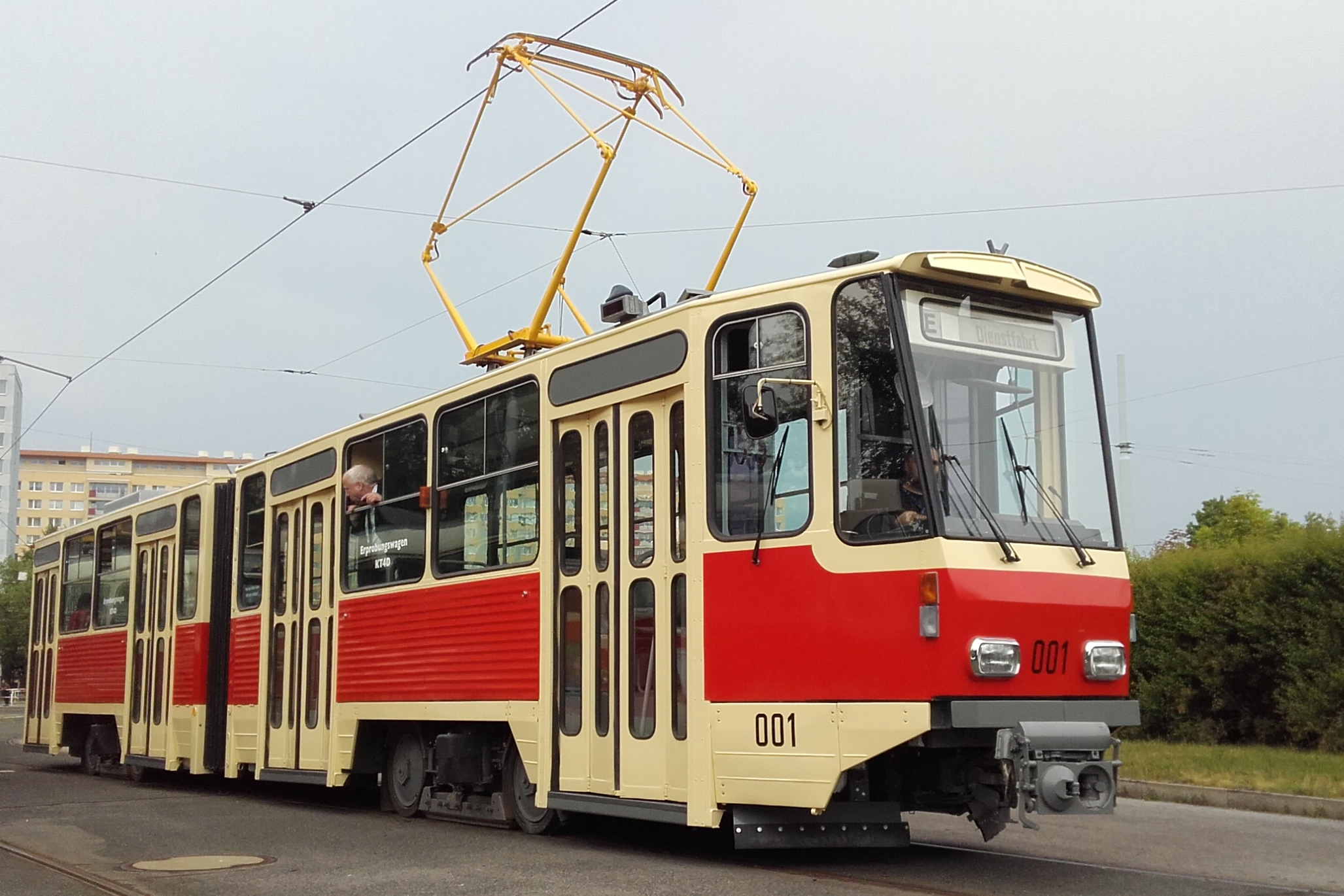
KT4 prototype 001 in Potsdam

==== Progression ====
In 1965, a set of two prototypes for the Munich tram was delivered. In the following years, series of trams were delivered (P2/3 motor cars and P2/3 trailers). The Czech tram type Tatra KT4 was also constructed according to this concept, and in total 1,767 were built. The first prototype (still having the body design of the Tatra T3) was tested in Prague in 1970. Two prototypes (with the final body design) were sent to Potsdam in December 1974.

==== Low-floor short-articulated tram ====
The city of Bremen also had the first low-floor version (from AEG/ADtranz) in 1990, at the same time being the first fully low-floor tram. The prototype for Bremen had standard gauge bogies, it was the city of Augsburg to receive the first version with metre gauge bogies. Munich and many other (primarily German) cities followed in later years. As of 2025, this concept is still in use, although no longer by the original manufacturer, but by companies such as Siemens (Avenio), Solaris, Astra and CRRC.

=== Multi-articulated tram ===
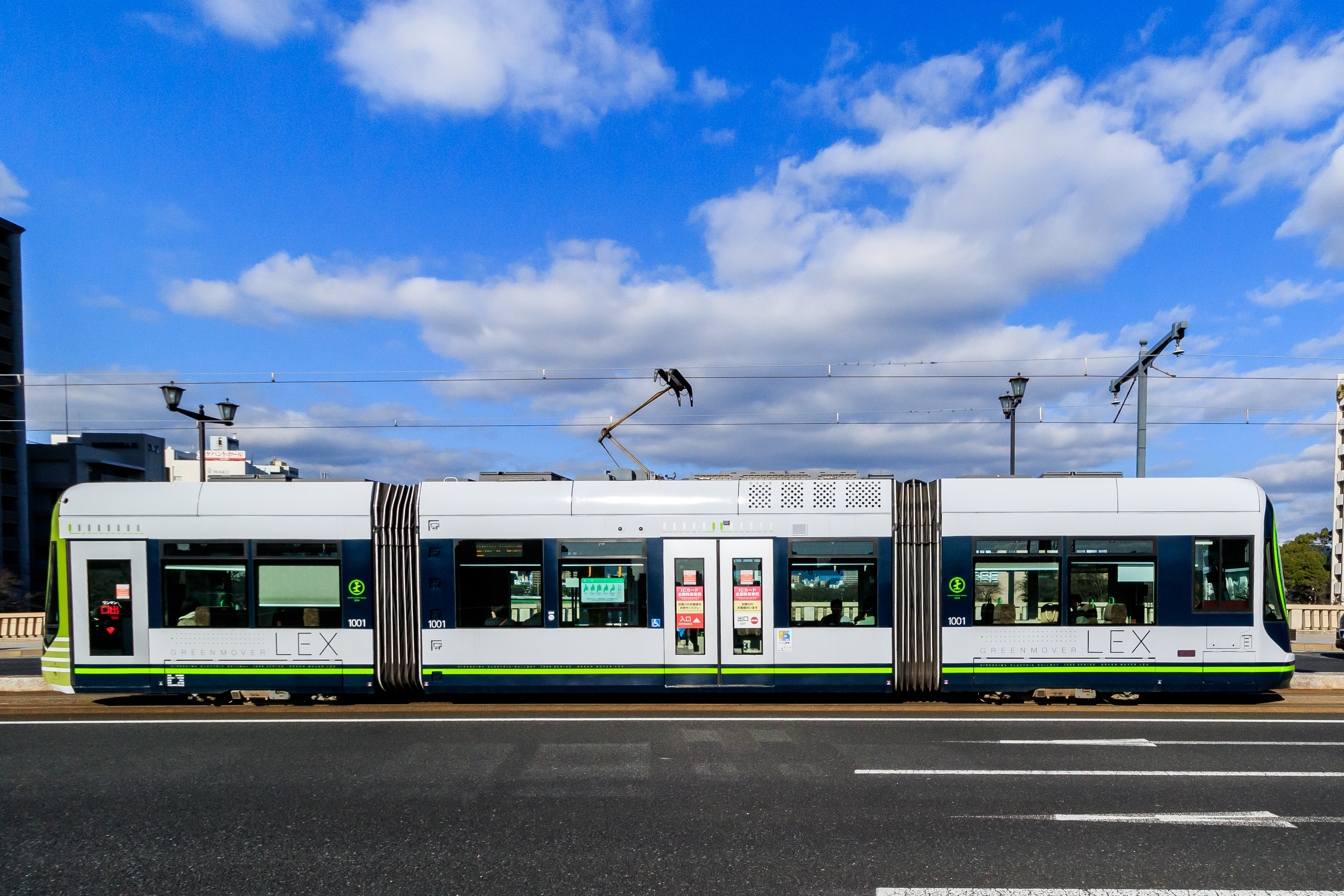
A Hiroden tram with the middle car body without wheels (Hiroshima, Japan)

Two-rooms-and-a-bath car (or multi-articulated tram) is a type of tram or streetcar with one or more suspended sections. The shortest examples consist of three sections; so called car bodies. The sections at the ends each have two axles or four wheels. The centre section is suspended between the end sections, spanning like a bridge. The centre section has no wheels and appears to be floating or suspended. Though experimental examples appeared late 19th century, this type only became popular in the 1960s in Europe and again in the late 1990s.

==== History ====
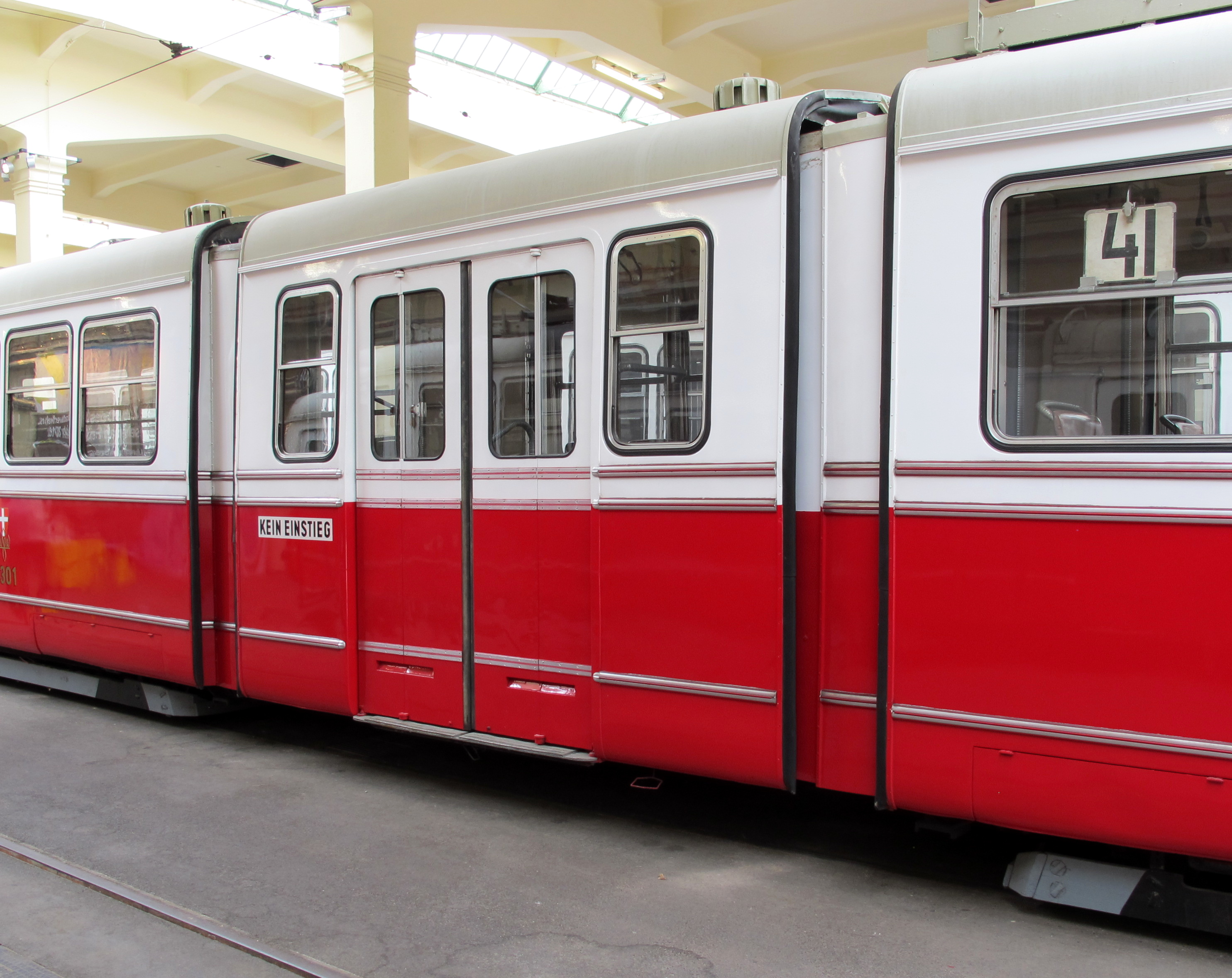
The floating section of a Wiener Linien tram (Vienna, Austria)

In 1892 a patent was registered by inventors Brewer and Krehbiel. The next year one streetcar was built for Cleveland. Only starting in 1912, a series was built for Boston.

The first city in Europe to use this type of tram was Gothenburg: ten were used in service from 1922. Other cities followed but with only one or two pieces: Oslo (1924), Dresden and Leipzig (both in 1928), Amsterdam and Milan (both in 1932). In Milan and later also in other Italian cities several series were put into service. Whereas in the United States the high floor version was only built before the Second World War, it became a success in Europe and mostly in Germany. One of the most successful models was the Gotha G4, named after its four axles, of which 319 units were built. The G4-61 followed the two-rooms-and-a-bath lay-out that was marketed in West-Germany by Credé. The production started in 1961; this tramtype is sometimes referred to as G4-61 and an updated version G4-65. Late 20th and early 21st century, the multi-articulated tram was the most popular low-floor tram globally.

==== Number of axles ====
The ′classic trams/streetcars′ (with a regular high-floor and steps at the doors) came in at least three variants: the end sections can each be supported by two, three or four axles. The last variant was used twice in Düsseldorf during the 1960s.

The low-floor trams come in two variants: the end sections can each be supported by two or four axles. Most low-floor trams have more than three sections. Trams/streetcars with five sections—of which three with wheels and two sections floating—are most common. Though less widespread, this type can consist of seven or nine sections: nine section trams only run in Budapest and Dublin.

=== Trams with suspended articulation ===
A tramcar with both end sections partly resting on the centre section

A tram with suspended articulation is a type of tram or streetcar architecture with one or more articulations being suspended. Here, articulations (i.e. permanent coupling) work like a hinge joint and are not supported by a bogie. This is unlike the more common solution with an articulation resting on a special connecting bogie, called a Jacobs bogie. Seen from the side at ground level, the suspended joint seems to be 'floating' because the lack of wheels directly under the joint.

The shortest examples consist of two sections. One section on two axles or two bogies; the other section rests both on one bogie and the other section, similar to a semi-trailer. In the diagram to the right, the short centre section supports the two end sections. Each of the end sections rests on one bogie and also on the centre section. It is a popular tram/light rail architecture for vehicles in North America.

==== History ====
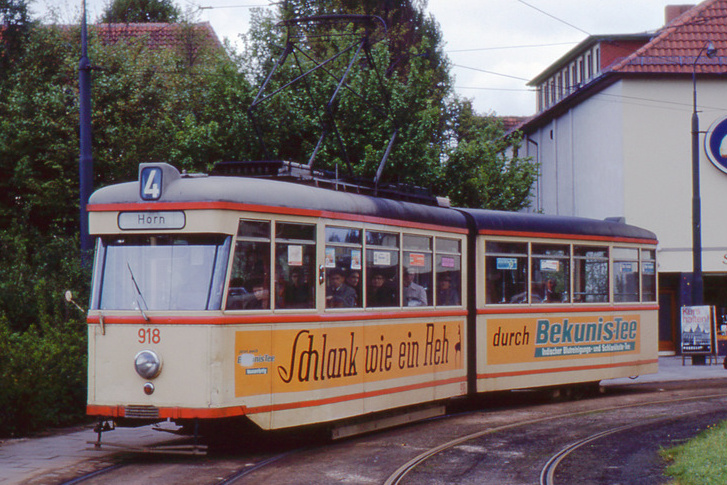
Articulated tram GT3 in Bremen

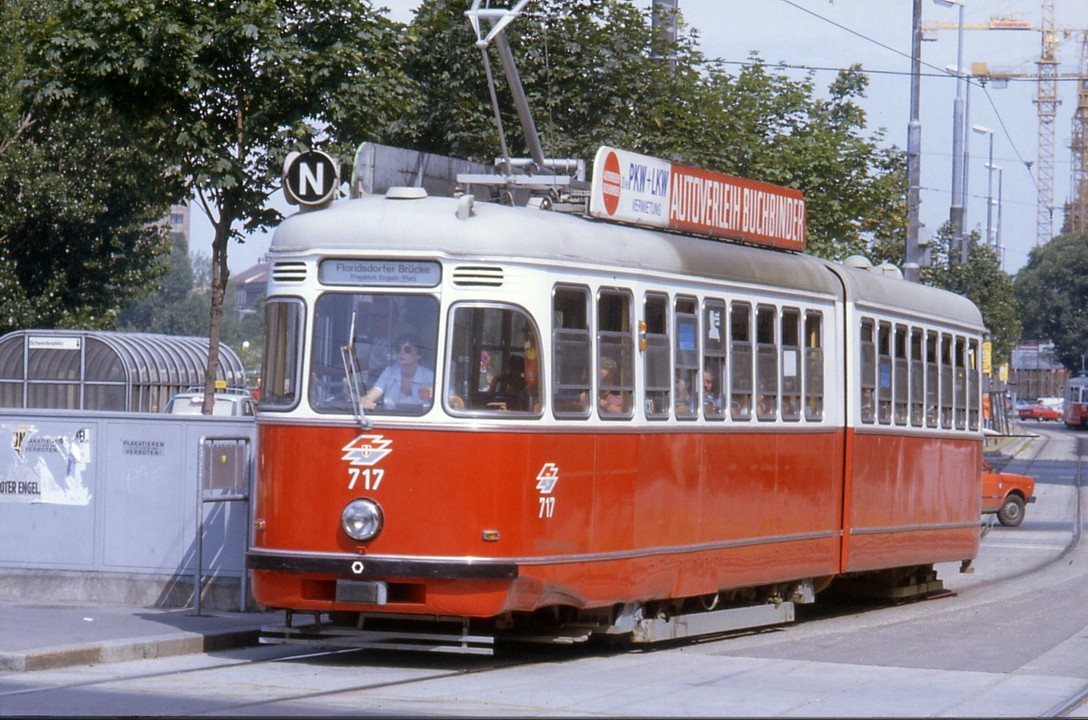
Type F in Vienna

In 1928 an experimental tram was constructed in Görlitz and then put into service in Dresden until the mid-1960s. This car was numbered 2501 and had three sections: the center section had four fixed wheels, both end sections had each only one adjustable axle. Genoa was the first city to have a series of trams of this type. From 1940 onwards 31 trams were built by combining older tramcars. The lay out was very simple: the front section had one four wheeled truck, the end sections followed like a semi-trailer and had one fixed axle at the rear. The ride comfort was rather poor.

The first newly built series appeared in Bremen in 1956. The only difference with the type in Genoa was that the end car hand a one-axle bogie and therefore slightly improved ride qualities. Vienna had an improved version of this type, with a two axle bogie at the end. This so-called Type F was longer than the version in Bremen and had a more streamlined design.

==== Second generation ====
The second generation of trams all have a pivoting bogie both at the front and the end side, the center rests on a set of four fixed wheels. With pivoting bogies and both ends, the ride is much smoother when entering curves. The first to use this concept was the Mirage type in Zürich in 1966. The next type of tram –the Type Freiburg– for the network in Freiburg, entered service in 1971. This type also had pivoting bogie and both ends, but also two pivoting bogies under the large middle section. This way all eight axles could be powered, as the technology to power Jacobs bogies wasn't developed yet. Most trams were in the 1970s were shorter than 30 m, but the GT8 measured nearly 33 m.

==== Low floor designs ====
The first modern low floor tram design also had floating articulations. Both Vevey and Duewag joined forces to create this tram type for the network in Geneva. Though the design didn't have an entirely low floor, as it was still 48 cm above the rail. The second type (being named TFS-2) has a similar setup as the Mirage trams for Zürich. Using floating articulations, Alstom was able to create a low floor (less than 35 cm high) over 60% of the tramcar length. Since the start of the Sheffield Supertram, it uses only vehicles with floating joints. This setup is used for the majority of LRVs in North America.

== Travel direction ==
=== Double-ended trams ===
A double-ended tram, also known as a bi-directional tram, has an operator's cab and controls at each end of the vehicle, which allows it to easily be driven at full speed in either direction on a continuous segment of track. Typically, at the end of a run, the tram's operator will walk from one end of the tram to the other, and then commence the tram route in the other direction. The tram is usually switched to another track by use of crossover points or Y-points. This design also allows for crossovers to be placed along the route to allow for direction switching in mid-route.

=== Single-ended trams ===
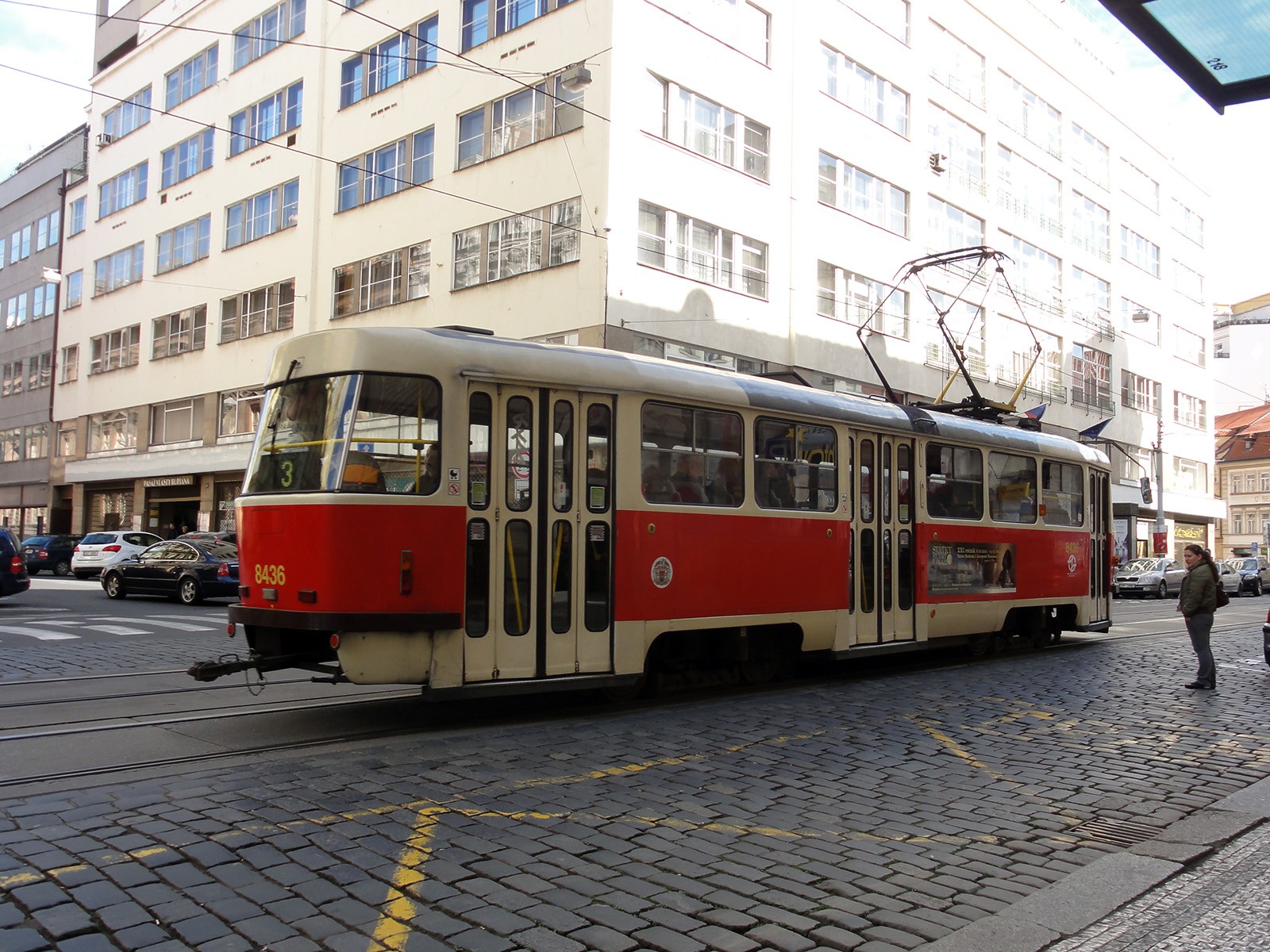
Single-ended tram

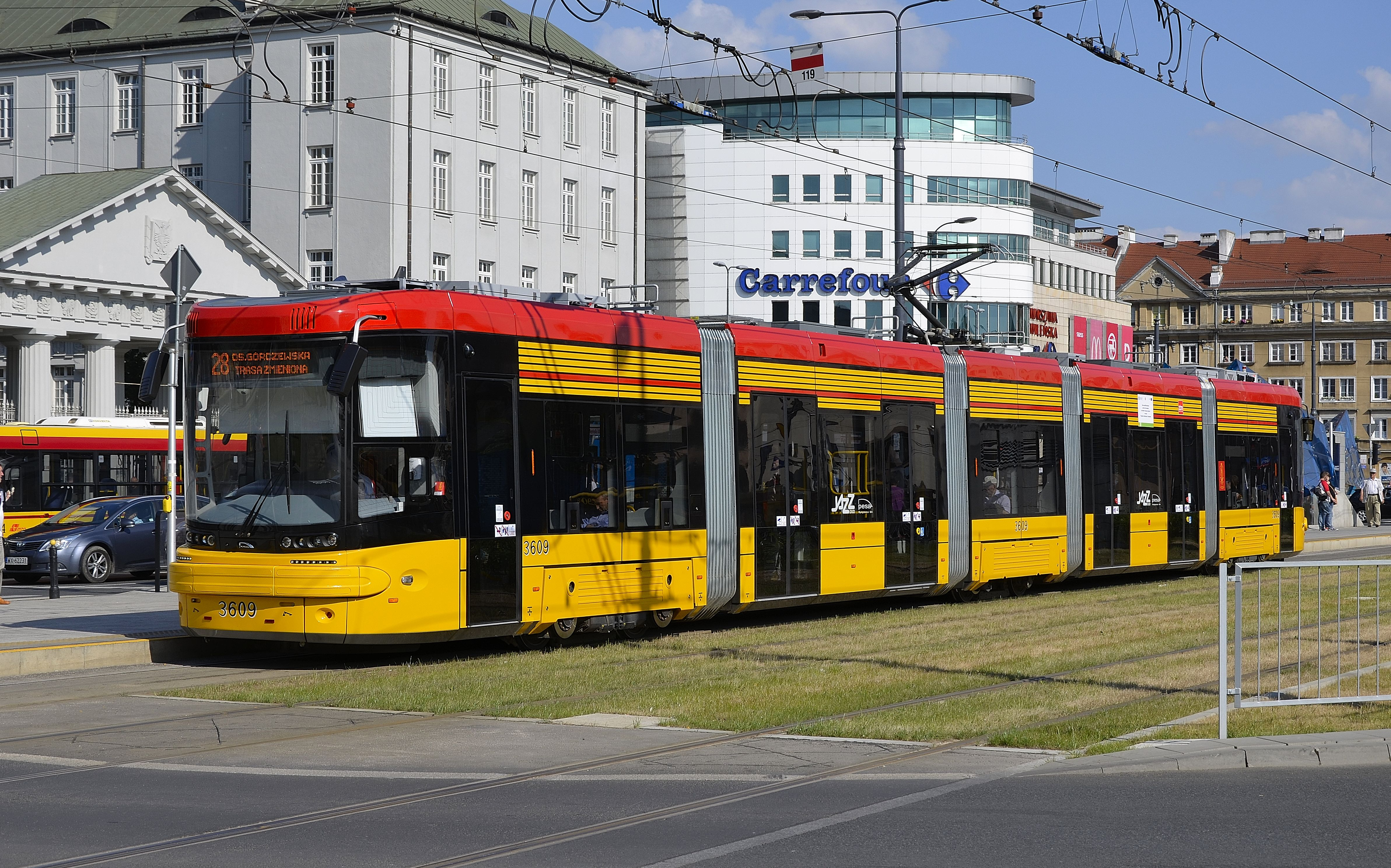
Double-ended tram

Trams are typically designed as uni-directional single-ended vehicles, or double-ended vehicles capable of being driven in both directions.

Conversely, a single-ended tram, also known as a uni-directional tram, needs a method of turning at termini so that the operator's cab is in the front of the tram for the reverse journey. This usually necessitates a turning loop or triangle. On the other hand, the single cab and controls and fewer door spaces make the tram lighter, increases passenger accommodation (including many more seats) and effects reductions in equipment, weight, first-cost, maintenance cost, and operating expense.

A single-ended tram has operator's controls at only one end, and can safely be driven at speed in the forward direction but is also capable of reverse movement, typically at slower speed, using a small set of controls at the rear. The configuration of the doors is usually asymmetrical, favouring the side expected to be closest to the street kerb and footpath. At the end of a run, the tram must be turned around via a balloon loop or some other method, to face in the opposite direction for a return trip.

Two single-ended trams with doors on both sides may be coupled into a (semi-)permanently coupled married pair or twinset, with operator's controls at each end of the combination. Such a setup is operated as if it were a double-ended tram, except that the operator must exit one vehicle and enter the other, when reversing at the end of the run.

=== Power ===
If overhead electrical power is fed from a trolley pole, the direction of the trolley pole must be reversed at the end of the run, to ensure that the pole is "pulled" behind or "trailing" the vehicle, to avoid 'dewiring'. This was achieved by a member of the crew swinging the pole through 180 degrees (if there was only one pole) or lowering one pole and raising the other if there were two. More commonly nowadays, a bidirectional pantograph may be used to feed power, eliminating the need for an extra procedure when reversing direction.

== Propulsion and guidance ==
=== Rubber-tyred tram ===
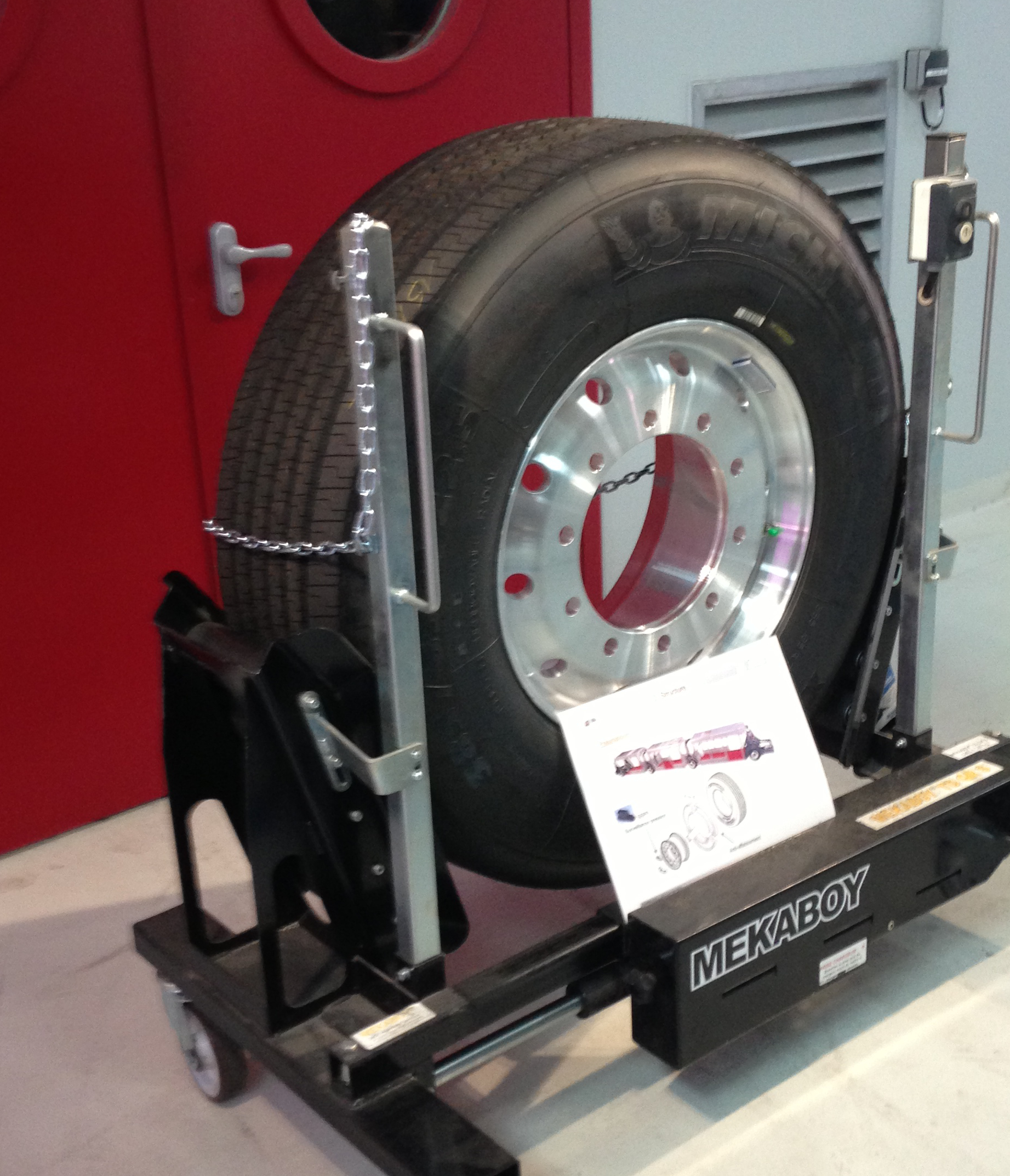
Rubber tyres used for the Translohr rubber-tyred trams. Rubber-tyred trams are trams that are guided by fixed rail, but also make use of rubber tyres.

A rubber-tyred tram is a guided bus which is guided by a fixed rail on the ground and uses overhead cables like a conventional tram. This can allow the vehicles to match the capacity of conventional trams and cope with gradients up to 13% due to the rubber tyres. There are two systems which use this technology: the Guided Light Transit (GLT) and Translohr. The GLT "trams" are legally considered buses as they have steering wheels and can leave the fixed rail when requirements dictate e.g. when journeying to a depot while a Translohr "tram" cannot operate without a guidance rail and are generally not considered buses.

==== Autonomous Rail Rapid Transit ====
This kind of trams are similar to buses, and can move on the roads without having rails. This kind of trams have been in development for almost 20 years from the 2000s. In 2017, Chinese Rail Corporation introduced an autonomously guided tram which is cheaper than the other competitors. Instead of running on rails, they follow painted lines with rubber tires by using GPS positioning and laser technology — with a centimeter accuracy. Batteries are recharged in stations in 30 seconds. It can move with 70kph speed.

== Other considerations ==
=== Styling ===
The Socimi Eurotram series was developed by Socimi of Italy. It is used by Strasbourg, Milan, and Porto. The Eurotram has a modern design that makes it look as much like a train as a tram and has large windows along its entire length.

=== Modular design ===
The Citadis tram, flagship of the French manufacturer Alstom, enjoys an innovative design combining lighter bogies with a modular concept for carriages providing more choices in the types of windows and the number of cars and doors. The recent Citadis-Dualis, intended to run at up to 100 km/h (62 mph), is suitable for stop spacings ranging from 500 m (1,600 ft) to 5 km (3.1 mi). Dualis is a strictly modular partial low-floor car, with all doors in the low-floor sections.

== Specialised uses ==
=== Cargo tram ===
Since the 19th century, goods have been carried on rail vehicles through the streets, often near docks and steelworks, for example the Weymouth Harbour Tramway in Weymouth, Dorset. Belgian vicinal tramway routes were used to haul agricultural produce, timber, and coal from Blégny colliery, and Porto carried coal by tram. Several of the US interurbans carried freight, and in Australia three different "freight cars" operated in Melbourne between 1927 and 1977 and the city of Kislovodsk in Russia had a freight-only tram system consisting of one line which was used exclusively to deliver bottled Narzan mineral water to the railway station.

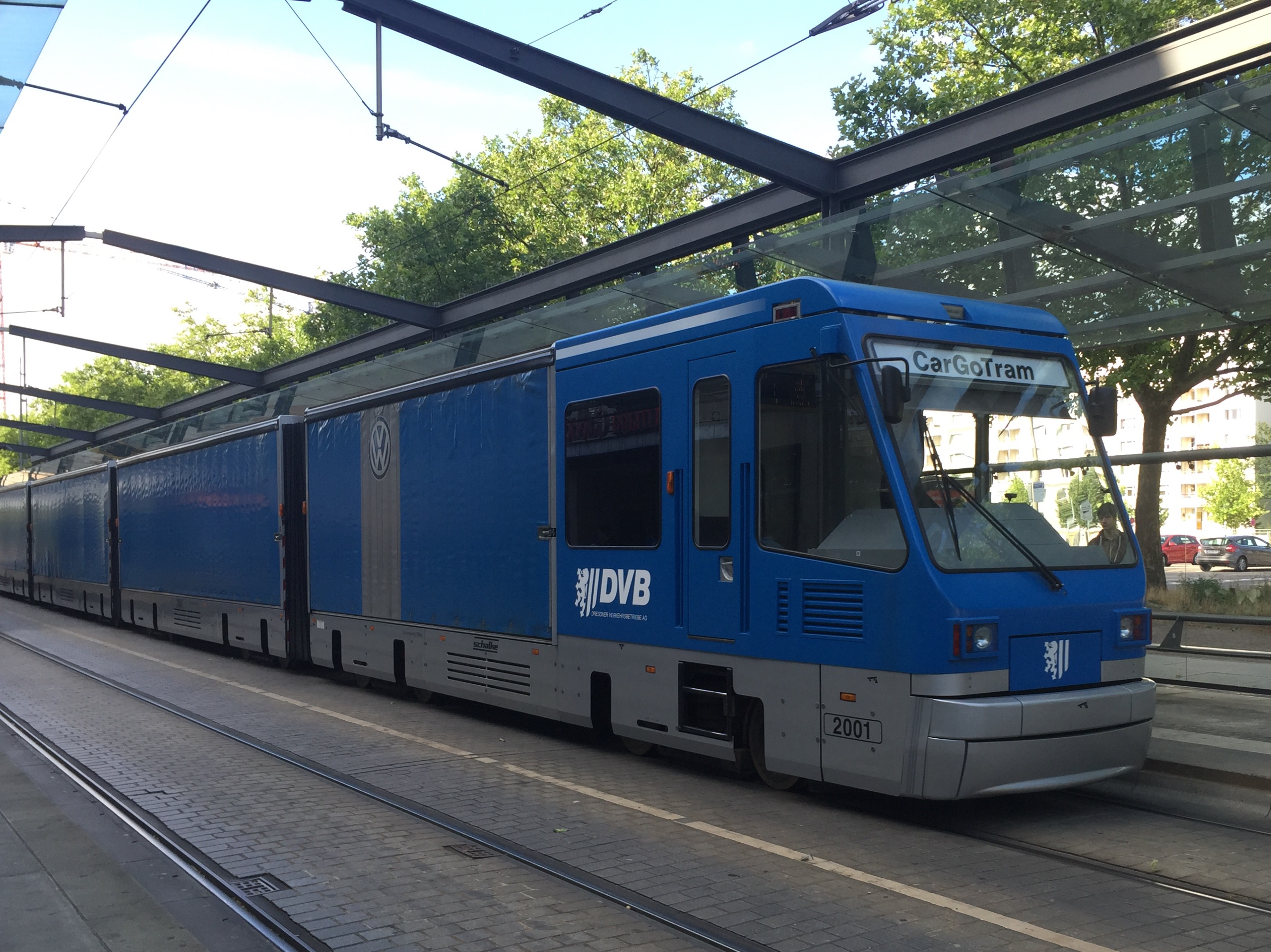
CarGoTram run by Volkswagen in Dresden. Trams operated by the service are used to carry freight, as opposed to passengers.

Until December 2020, the German city of Dresden had a regular CarGoTram service, run by the world's longest tram trainsets (59.4 metres [194 ft 11 in]), carrying car parts across the city centre to its Volkswagen factory. In addition to this, the cities of Vienna and Zürich have used trams as mobile recycling depots in the past.

At the turn of the 21st century, a new interest has arisen in using urban tramway systems to transport goods. The motivation now is to reduce air pollution, traffic congestion and damage to road surfaces in city centres.

One recent proposal to bring cargo tramways back into wider use was the plan by City Cargo Amsterdam to reintroduce them into the city of Amsterdam. In the spring of 2007 the city piloted this cargo tram operation, which among its aims aimed to reduce particulate pollution in the city by 20% by halving the number of lorries (5,000) unloading in the inner city during the permitted timeframe from 07:00 till 10:30. The pilot involved two cargo trams, operating from a distribution centre and delivering to a "hub" where special electric trucks delivered the trams' small containers to their final destination. The trial was successful, releasing an intended investment of €100 million in a fleet of fifty-two cargo trams distributing from four peripheral "cross docks" to fifteen inner-city hubs by 2012. These specially built vehicles would be 30 feet (9.14 m) long with twelve axles and a payload of 30 tonnes (33.1 short tons; 29.5 long tons). On weekdays, trams are planned to make 4 deliveries per hour between 7 a.m. and 11 a.m. and two per hour between 11 a.m. and 11 p.m. With each unloading operation taking on average 10 minutes, this means that each site would be active for 40 minutes out of each hour during the morning rush hour. In early 2009, the scheme was suspended due to the 2008 financial crisis impeding fund-raising.

=== Restaurant tram ===
Similar to the buffet car or dining car on a train, on a restaurant tram, meals can be served in a way of a full-service, sit-down restaurant. Customers consume the meals while the tram is following a route along an existing network of a tram system or line. Old trams are often used with a rebuilt interior and upholstered seats and tables. Most restaurant trams are equipped with a small kitchen only used to serve meals, while a traditional kitchen in a stationary restaurant is used to do most preparations. A subtype is the pub restaurant tram, serving drinks and snacks.

The unique experiences of restaurant trams are popular in social media posts, which have become more common in the twentieth century. It is in line with a trend where people in their spare time are expecting dining out to become more of an experience. Alternatively, one can dine on a static tube train in London and on a double-decker bus in Singapore.

Some of the cities that operate or have operated a restaurant tram are:

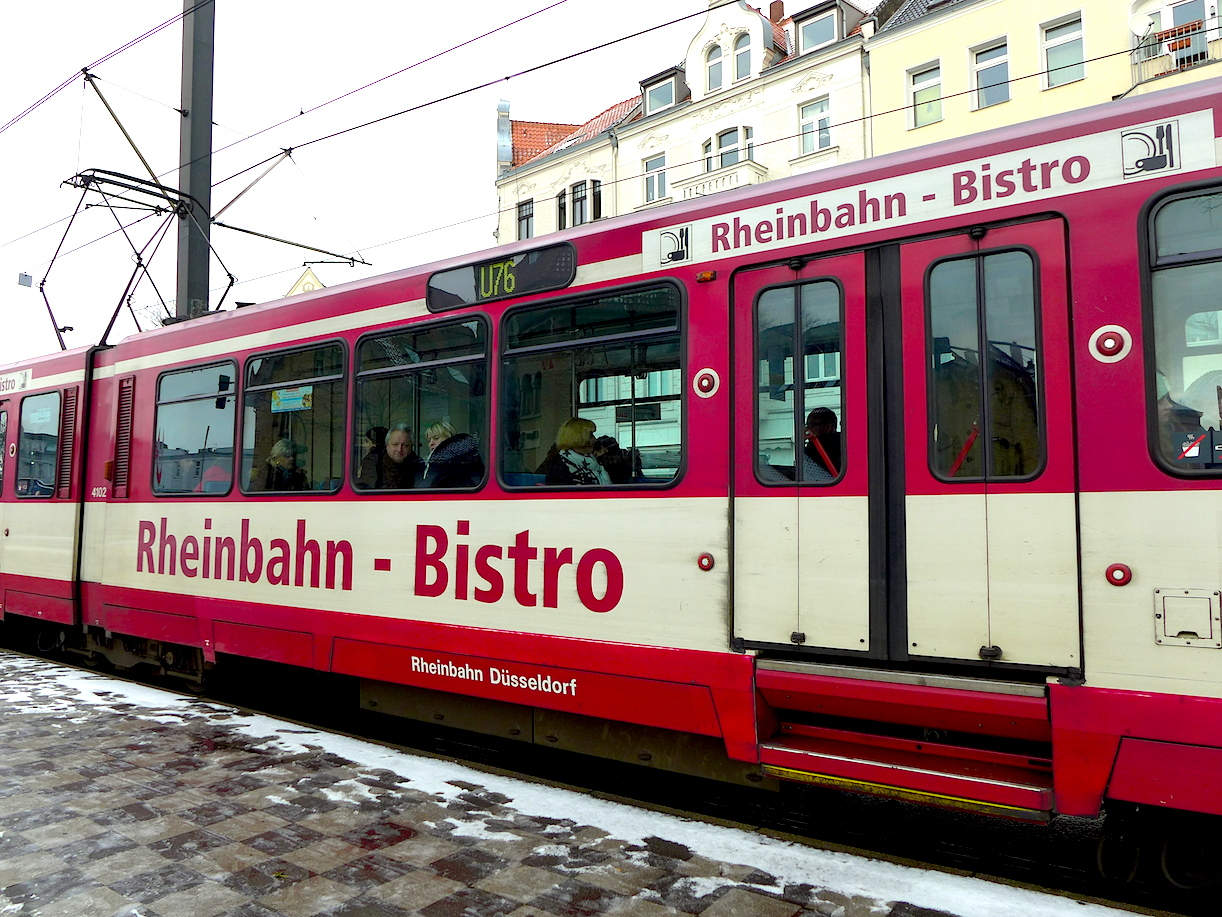
Former "Bistrowagen" in Düsseldorf

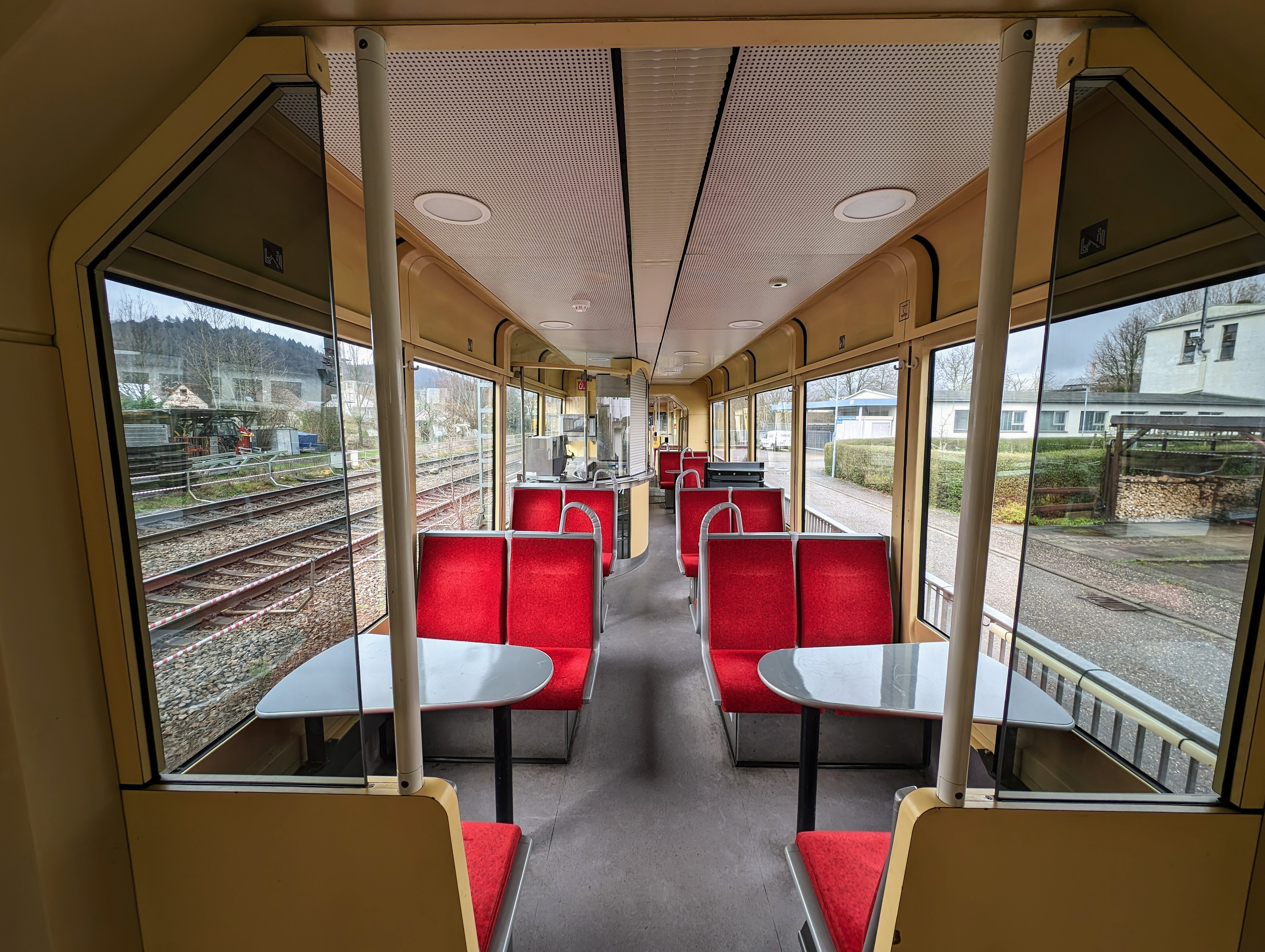
"Bistrowagen" in Karlsruhe region

- Bistro trams with buffets operated for a brief period in 1911 on the Amsterdam–Zandvoort tram line.
- The U76/U70 tram line between the German cities of Düsseldorf and Krefeld used to offer a Bistrowagen ("dining car" in German), where passengers could order drinks and snacks. That practice dates back to 1924, when interurban trams conveyed a dining car. With the introduction of modern tram units in 1981, four trams had a Bistrowagen that operated every weekday until 2014. A similar service was offered in the region of Karlsruhe.
- In 1976 the first full dining restaurant started running in Bern using a historic tramcar and trailer.

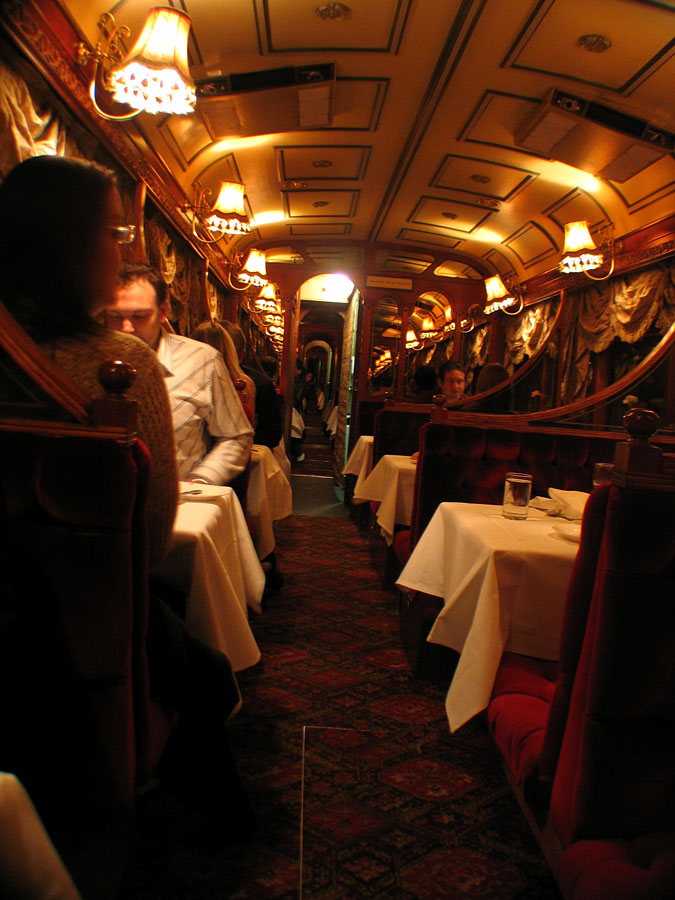
Interior of one of three Colonial Tramcar Restaurants that operated in Melbourne, Australia

- In 1983 the Colonial Tramcar Restaurant started running in Melbourne using three historic W-class trams. All three often run in tandem and there are usually multiple meal sittings. Bookings often close months in advance. The service had to close in 2018 because the trams were seen as too unsafe to operate between other traffic. At that time, trams were temporarily taken off the road after failing a Yarra Trams' safety assessment due to badly weathered underlying structures. Until the trams again meet safety standards, the trams are offering stationary dining. As of October 2019, they were still not running.
- Since 2005 in Milan, two historic tramcars - Class 1500 - from 1928 are in use as a restaurant.
- In 2006, one restaurant tram entered a service in Turin, a second one followed in 2011. The restaurant service was transferred to an external party early 2023.
- The Hague's tram restaurant service started in 2014, within ten years it made over 2500 trips through the city. The initiator got his inspiration from the Melbourne example.
- Zurich has introduced a new tram vehicle, type 2000 (number 2095), in May 2025. It replaces the so called Elefant tramcar from 1930, since 1993 in use as a restaurant tram. For the new tramcar, the theme of the interior is 1970s/1980s retro design, in line with the exterior of the tram. The high demand for the restaurant service, since 2025 called "Event-Linie" is one reason to introduce a new renovated car; the capacity grew to 48 seats.
- Edmonton had a tram where desserts were served, as part of a crowd-funding campaign in 2016.

The restaurant services also operate or used to operate in Adelaide, Bendigo in Australia; Brussels in Belgium, Amsterdam, Rotterdam and The Hague in the Netherlands; Nürnberg and Nordhausen in Germany; Timișoara in Romania; Kolkata in India, Christchurch in New Zealand; Milan, Rome and Turin in Italy; Moscow, Russia; Almaty, Kazakhstan.

==== Pub tram ====
Some cities and regions have a pub tram service:

- The first pub tram in Germany started operations in Frankfurt am Main in 1977. Due to its success, the fleet consists of two motorised trams and four trailer cars.
- Since 1995, Helsinki has a pub tram named SpåraKoff.
- In 2025 a trial started in Changchun with a café in a hydrogen powered tram. A total of six tramcars are planned to be in service.
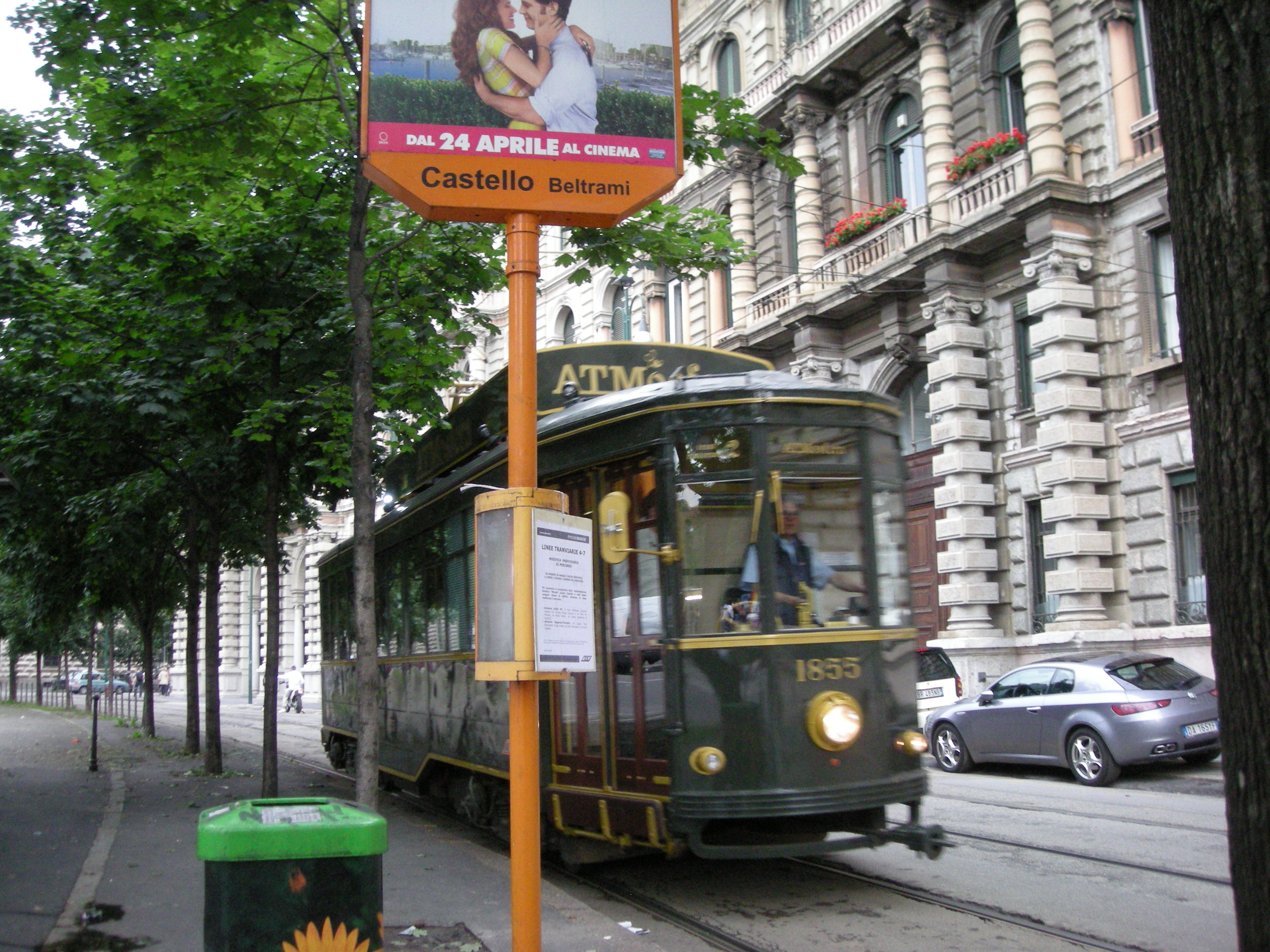
Class-1500 tram in Milan

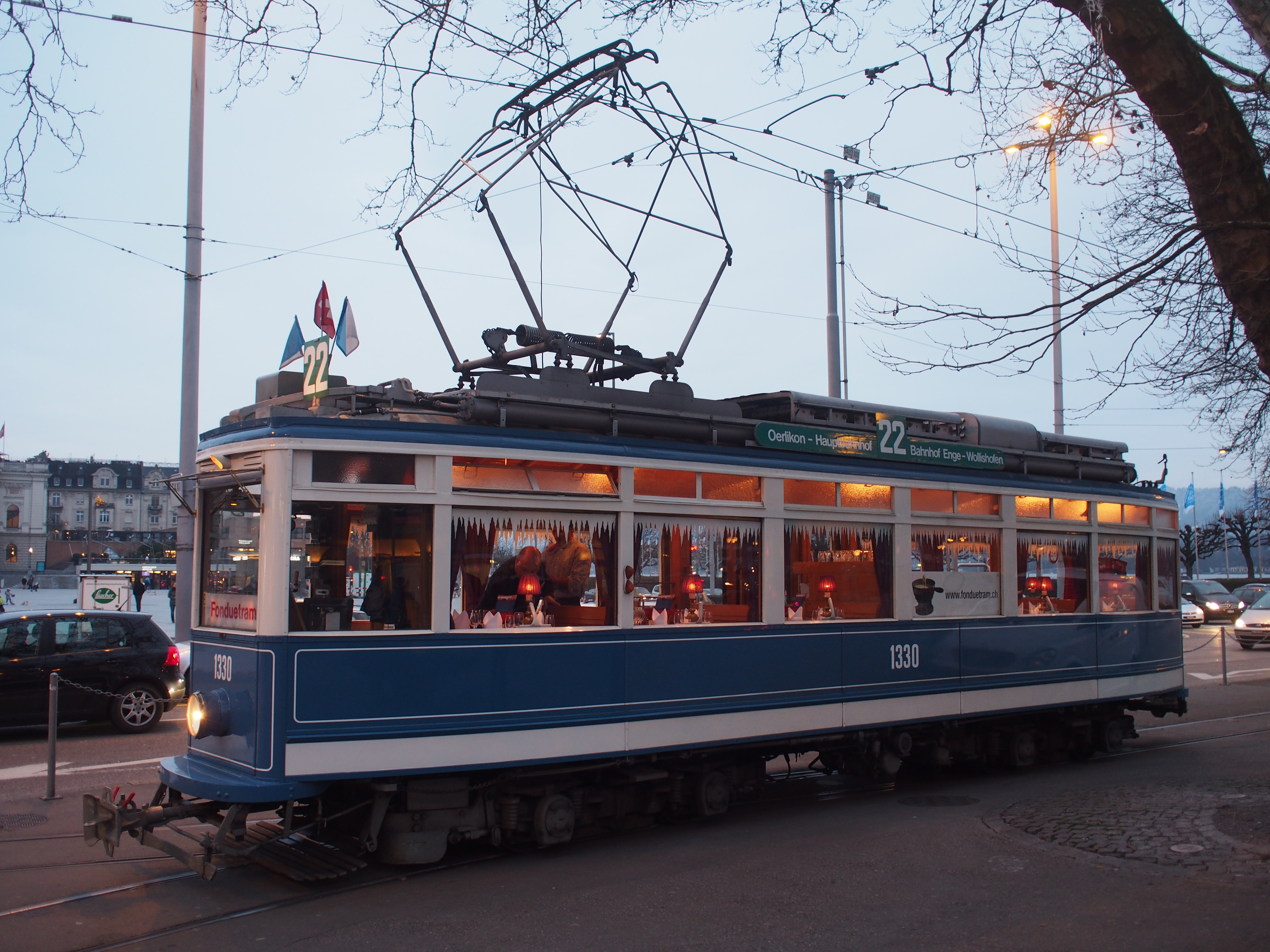
Ce 4/4 Elefant type tram in Zurich

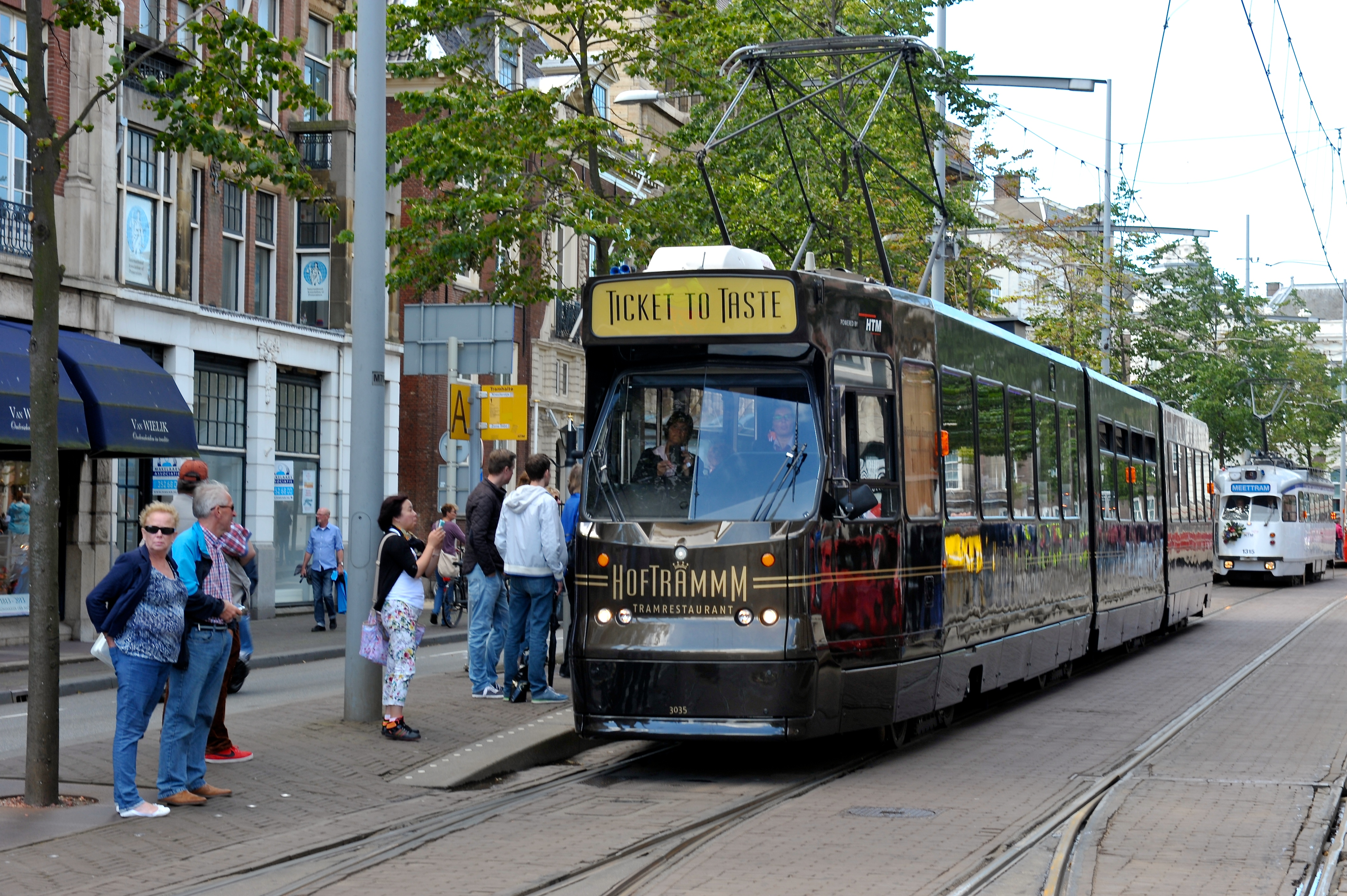
GTL-8 tram in The Hague

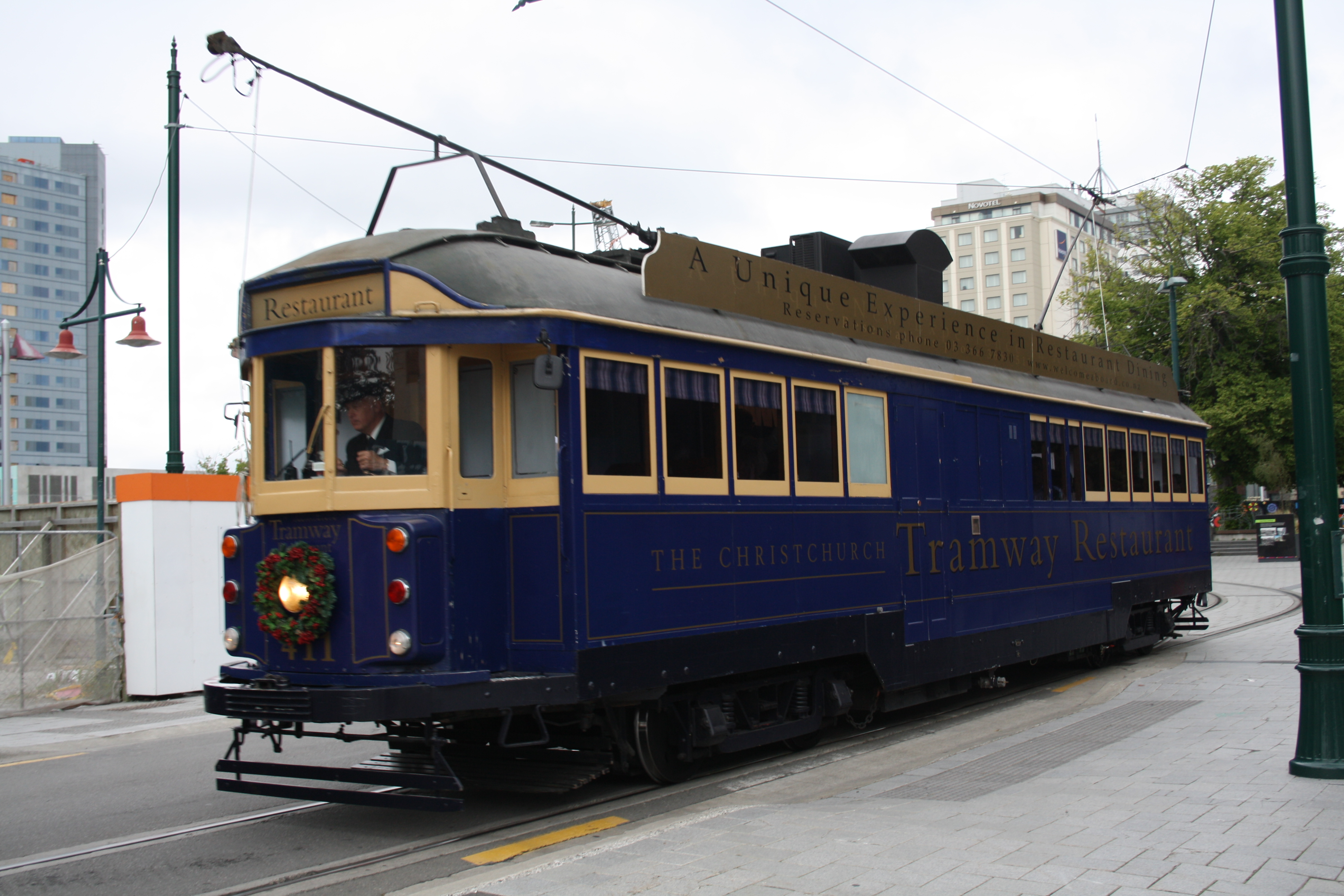
Tram 411 in Christchurch

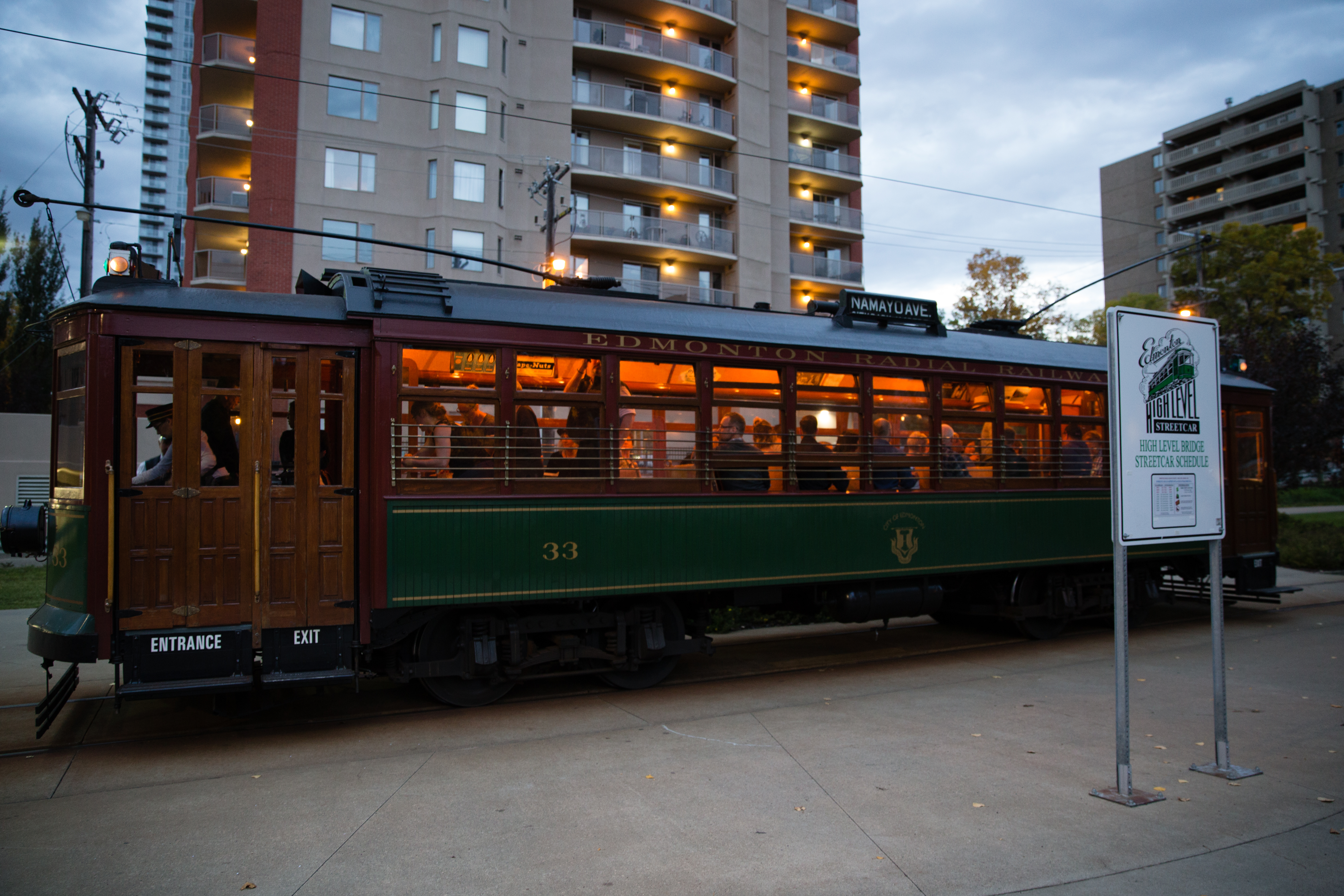
Tram 33 in Edmonton

In Germany, about twenty cities and regions have a pub tram service.

=== Dog car ===
In 1937, Melbourne passenger tramcar C class number 30 was converted for transporting dogs and their owners to the Royal Melbourne Showgrounds. It was known as the "dog car" and was scrapped in 1955.

=== Hearse tram ===
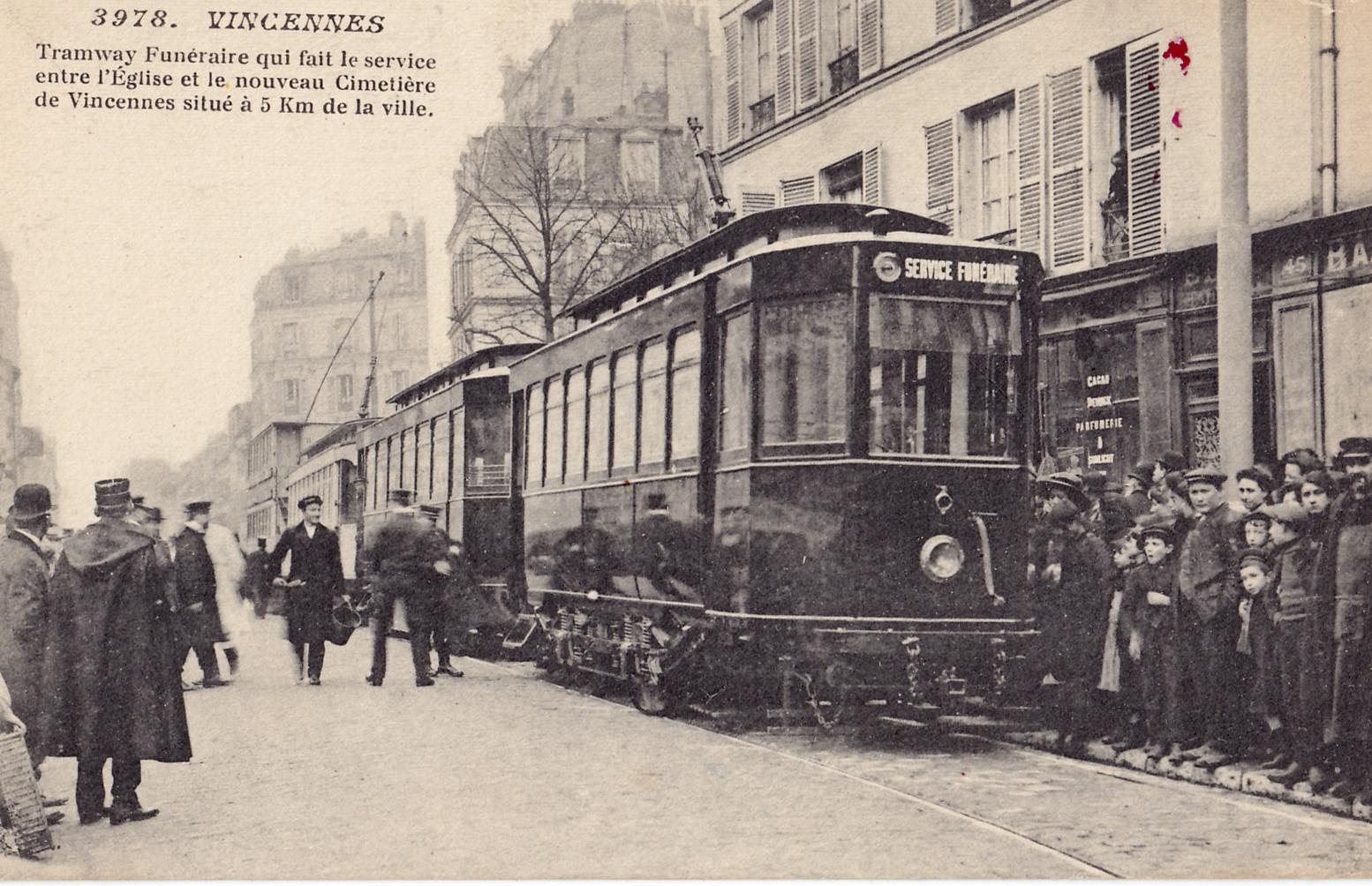
Hearse trams in Paris. Trams were used as hearses in the late 19th and early 20th century.

Specially appointed hearse trams, or funeral trolley cars, were used for funeral processions in many cities in the late 19th and early 20th century, particularly cities with large tram systems. The earliest known example in North America was Mexico City, which was already operating twenty-six funeral cars in 1886. In the United States, funeral cars were often given names. At the turn of the century, "almost every major city [in the US] had one or more" such cars in operation.

In Milan, Italy, hearse trams were used from the 1880s (initially horse-drawn) to the 1920s. The main cemeteries, Cimitero Monumentale and Cimitero Maggiore, included funeral tram stations. Additional funeral stations were located at Piazza Firenze and at Porta Romana. In the mid-1940s at least one special hearse tram was used in Turin, Italy. It was introduced due to the wartime shortage of automotive fuel. Newcastle, Australia also operated two hearse trams between 1896 and 1948.

=== Maintenance tram ===
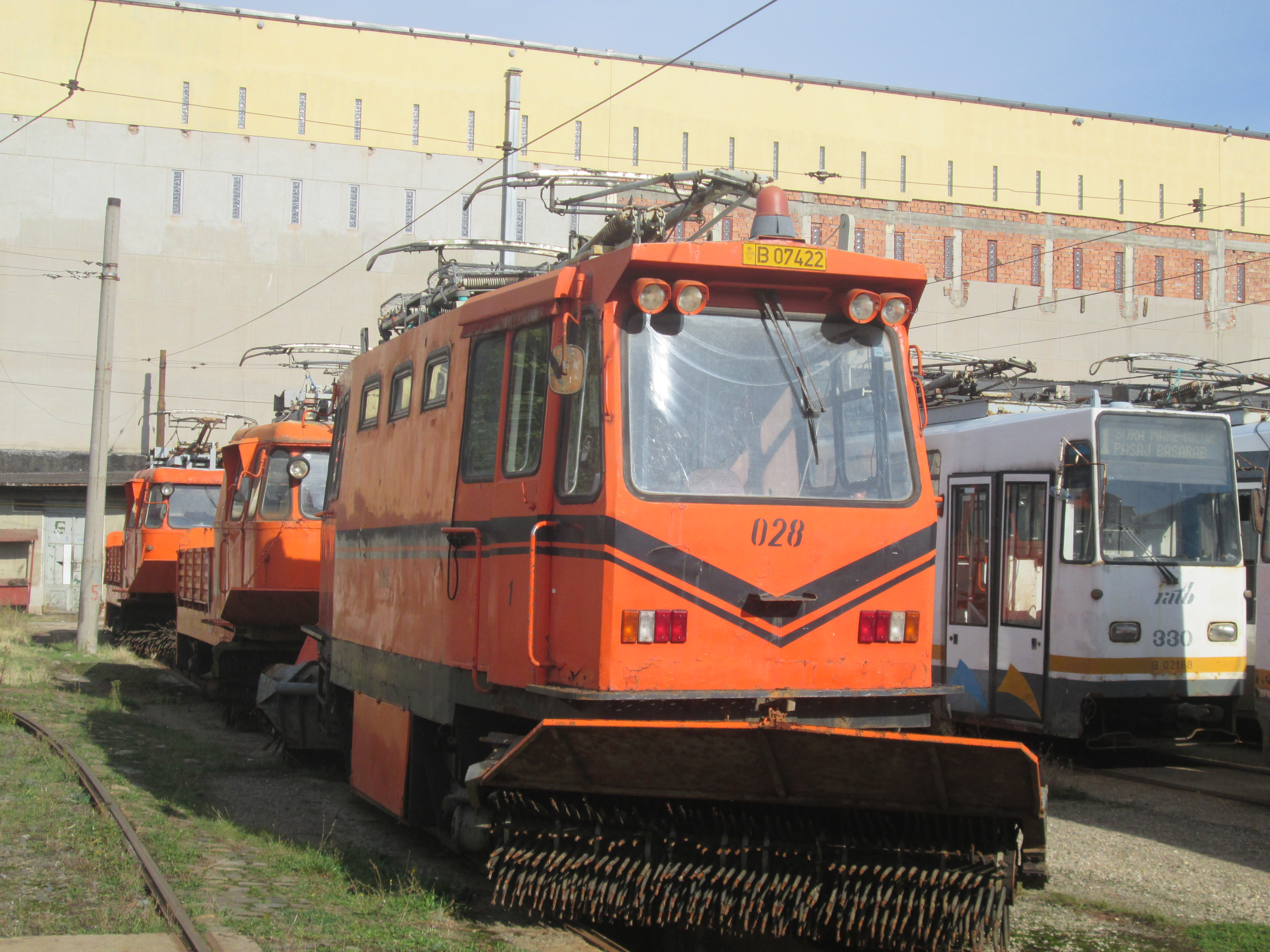
A custom-built snow removal tram in Bucharest. It uses a rotating brush to push the snow aside from the tracks.

Most systems had cars that were converted to specific uses on the system, other than simply the carriage of passengers. As just one example of a system, Melbourne used or uses the following "technical" cars: a ballast motor, ballast trailers, blow-down cars, breakdown cars, conductors' or drivers' instruction cars, a laboratory testing car, a line marking car, a pantograph testing car, per way locomotives, a rail hardener locomotive, a scrapper car, scrubbers, sleeper carriers, track cleaners, a welding car, and a wheel transport car. Some were built new for specific purposes, including: rail grinders, scrubbers/track cleaners, and a workshops locomotive.

=== Mobile library service ===
Munich tram No.24, delivered in 1912, was refurbished as a mobile library in 1928. Known as "Städtische Wanderbücherei München", it was in public service until 1970. It was preserved and is now on public display in a railway museum in Hanover. Edmonton, Alberta, used a streetcar bookmobile from 1941 to 1956.

=== Nursery tram ===
After World War II, in both Warsaw and Wrocław, Poland, so-called "tram-nurseries" were in operation, collecting children from the workplaces of their parents (often tram employees). These mobile nurseries either carried the children around the system or delivered them to the nursery school run by the transport company.

=== Tourist tram ===
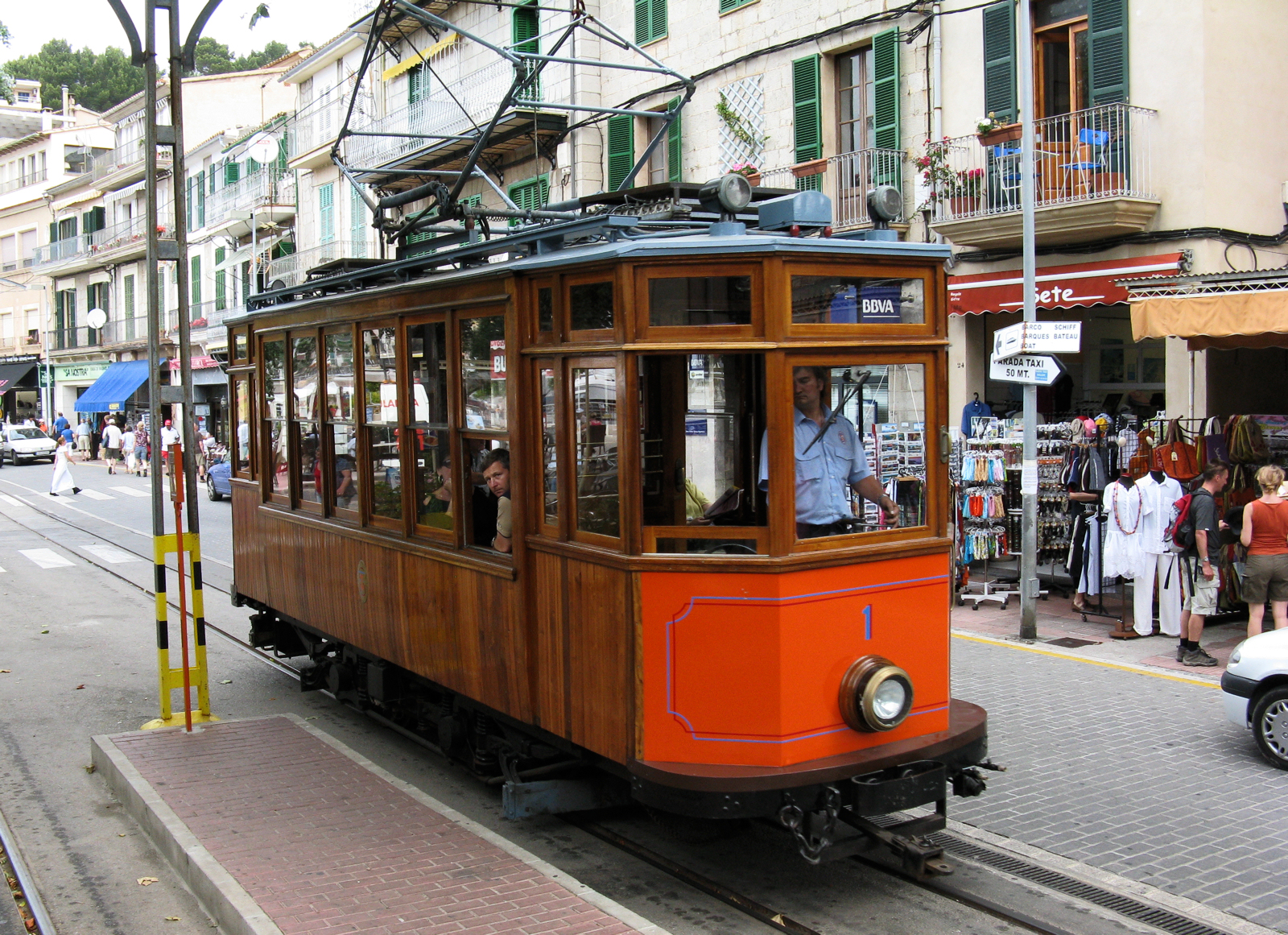
A heritage tram operated by Tranvía de Sóller. Heritage trams are operated to draw tourists and tram enthusiasts.

Many systems have retained historical trams which will often run over parts of the system for tourists and tram enthusiasts.

In Melbourne, Australia, several iconic W class trams run throughout the city in a set route which circles the Central Business District. They are primarily for the use of tourists, although often also used by regular commuters.

=== Tram-train ===
A tram-train is a light-rail public transport system where trams run through from an urban tramway network to main-line railway lines which are shared with conventional trains. This allows passengers to travel from suburban areas into city-centre destinations without having to change from a train to a tram.

Tram-train operation uses vehicles such as the Flexity Link and Regio-Alstom Citadis, which are suited for use on urban tram lines and also meet the necessary indication, power, and strength requirements for operation on main-line railways.

It has been primarily developed in Germanic countries, in particular Germany and Switzerland. Karlsruhe is a notable pioneer of the tram-train.

=== Contractors' mobile office ===
Two former passenger cars from the Melbourne system were converted and used as mobile offices within the Preston Workshops between 1969 and 1974, by personnel from Commonwealth Engineering and ASEA who were connected with the construction of Melbourne's Z Class cars.
