= Trams in Gera =

Tram system in Gera, Thuringia, Germany

Coordinates: 50°52′N 12°05′E

Gera tramway network
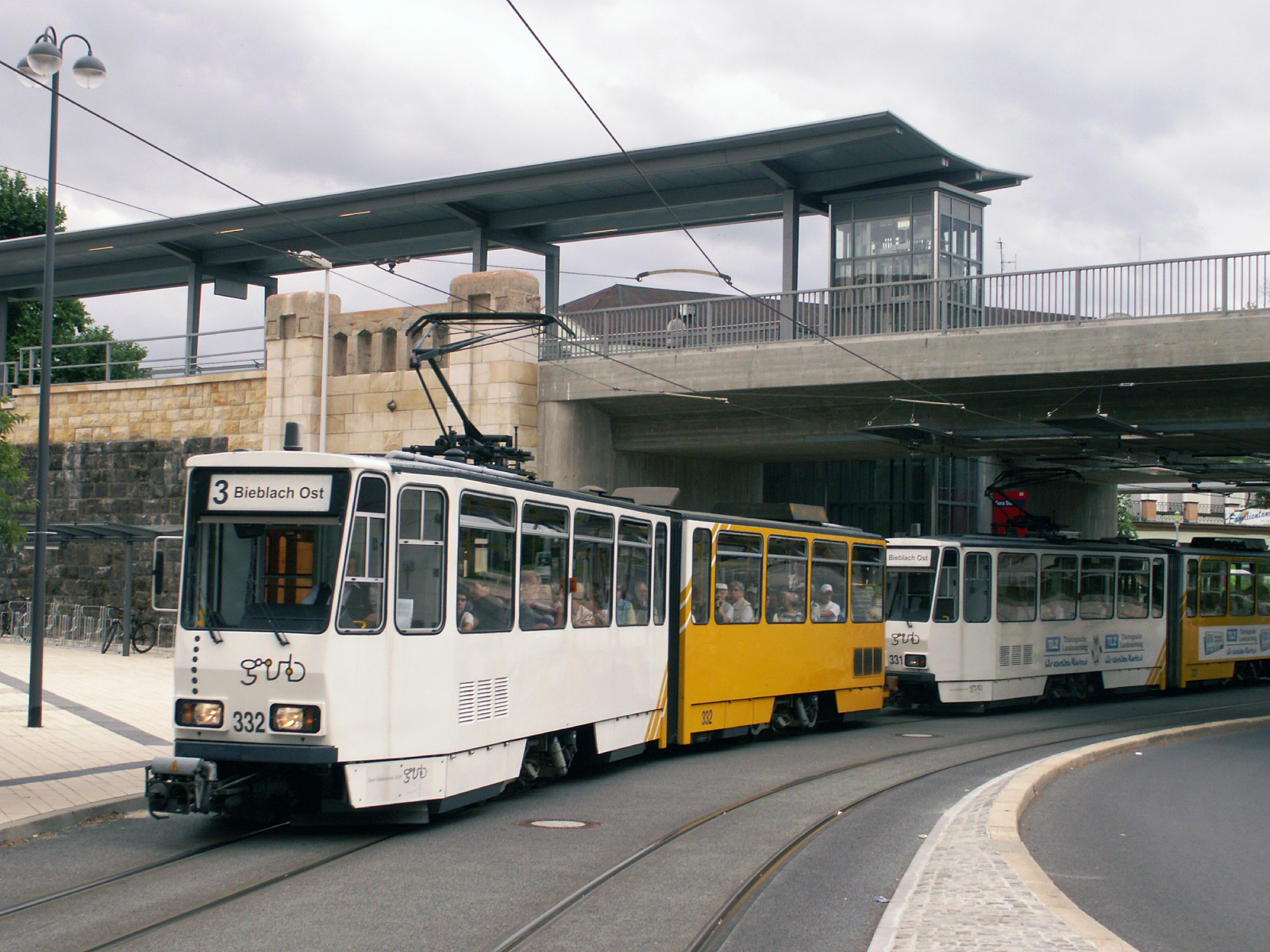
- Tatra KT4 tram at Gera Südbahnhof, 2007

Operation
- Locale: Gera, Thuringia, Germany
- Open: 1883
- Status: Operational
- Lines: 3
- Operator: Geraer Verkehrsbetrieb GmbH (GVB)

Infrastructure
- Track gauge: 1,000 mm (3 ft 3 3/8 in) metre gauge
- Propulsion system: Electricity

Statistics
Overview
Gera tramway network, 2013.
- Website: http://www.gvbgera.de Geraer Verkehrsbetrieb GmbH (in German)

The Gera tramway network is a network of tramways forming part of the public transport system in Gera, a city in the federal state of Thuringia, Germany.

Opened in 1883, the network is operated by Geraer Verkehrsbetrieb GmbH (GVB), and integrated in the Verkehrsverbund Mittelthüringen (VMT).

== Lines ==
As of 2011, the network consisted of the following lines:

| Line | Route | Length (km) | Travel time (min) | Stops |
|---|---|---|---|---|
| 1 | Untermhaus – Friedrich-Naumann-Platz – Hauptbahnhof/Theater – Heinrichstraße – Wintergarten – Zwötzen | 6.5 | 19 | 13 |
| 2 | Lusan-Brüte – Lusan-Laune – Betriebshof GVB – Bahnhof Zwötzen | 2.6 | 8 | 7 |
| 3 | Lusan-Zeulsdorf – Lusan-Laune – An der Spielwiese – Heinrichstraße – Straße des Bergmanns – Tinz – Berufsakademie – Bieblach-Ost | 12.1 | 33 | 25 |

During peak times, line 1 operates at 10-minute intervals, line 2 20 minutes, and line 3 Monday-Friday 5 minutes (7½ minutes on holidays), 10 minutes at weekends. Off peak only lines 1 and 3 run at 30-minute intervals. In the evenings only line 3 runs, taking 70 minutes for a return trip.

For major events in the Hofwiesenpark, such as the Hofwiesenparkfest, line 5 runs Lusan-Brüte – Heinrichstraße – Untermhaus 15 minutes either side of lines 1 and 3, reducing to 15 minutes the off-peak service interval between Lusan, the most heavily populated part of Gera, and Untermhaus.

== Rolling stock ==
The current fleet consists of:

- 22 KT4D (built in 1981–1983 and 1990)
- 6 KTNF8 (built in 1990)
- 12 low-floor trams (built in 2006–2008 by Alstom LHB)
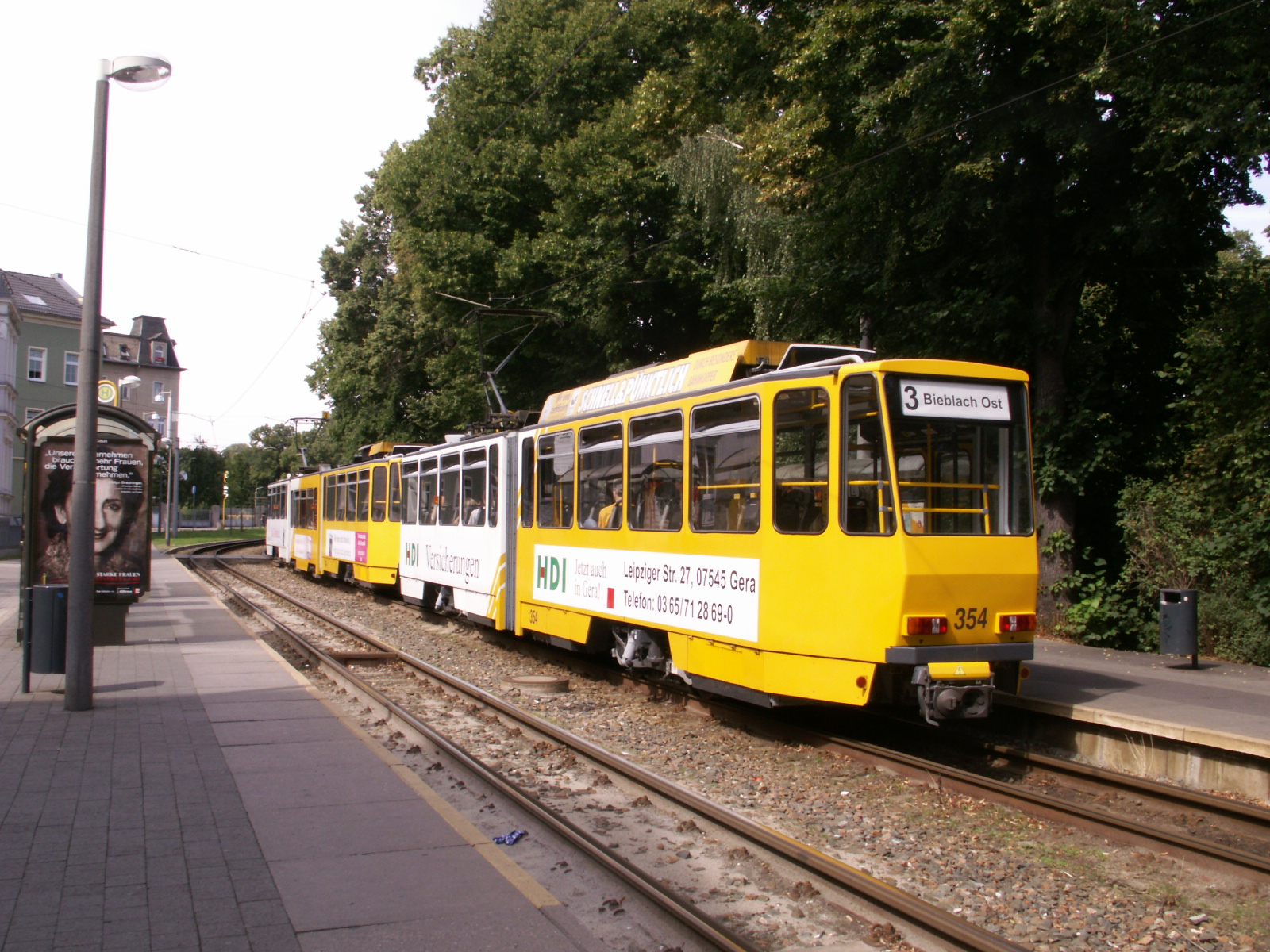
KTNF8 and KT4D

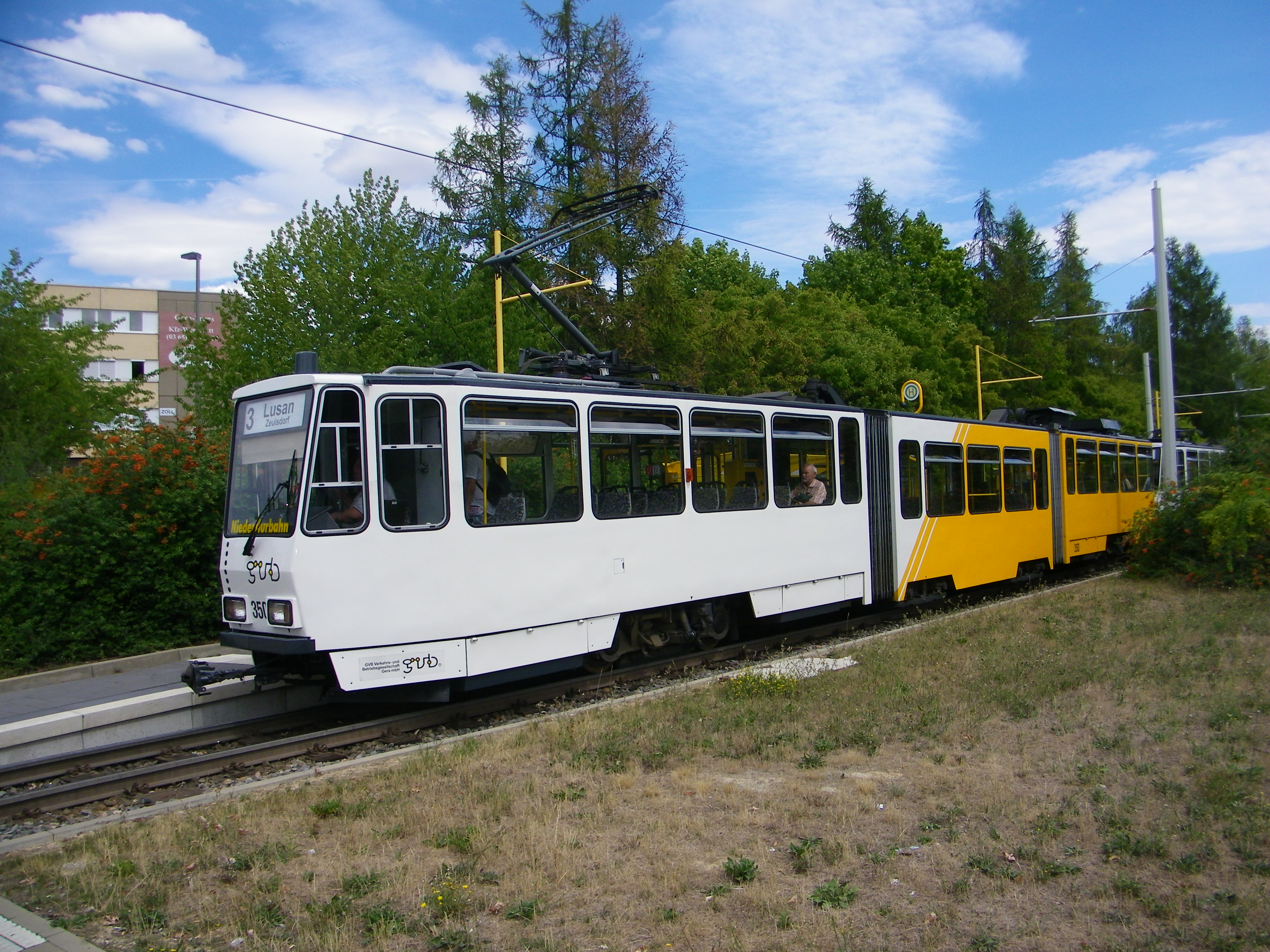
KTNF8

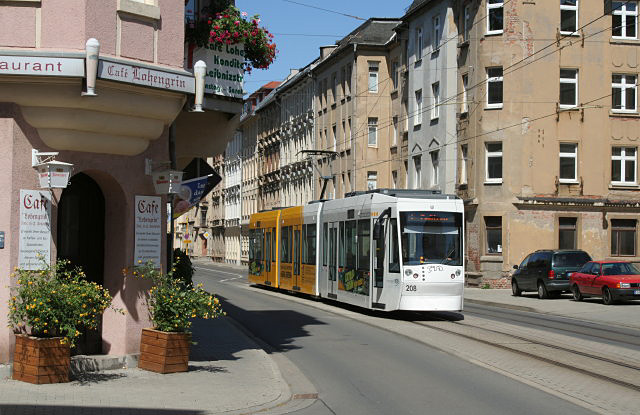
Low-floor tram

On 11 December 2023, GVB awarded Stadler a contract to supply six TINA trams for the network, with options for a further three units. The first tram arrived on 5 March 2026. The TINA trams will gradually replace the Tatra trams.

== See also ==
- List of town tramway systems in Germany
- Trams in Germany
