= Stadler TINA =

Tram vehicle family

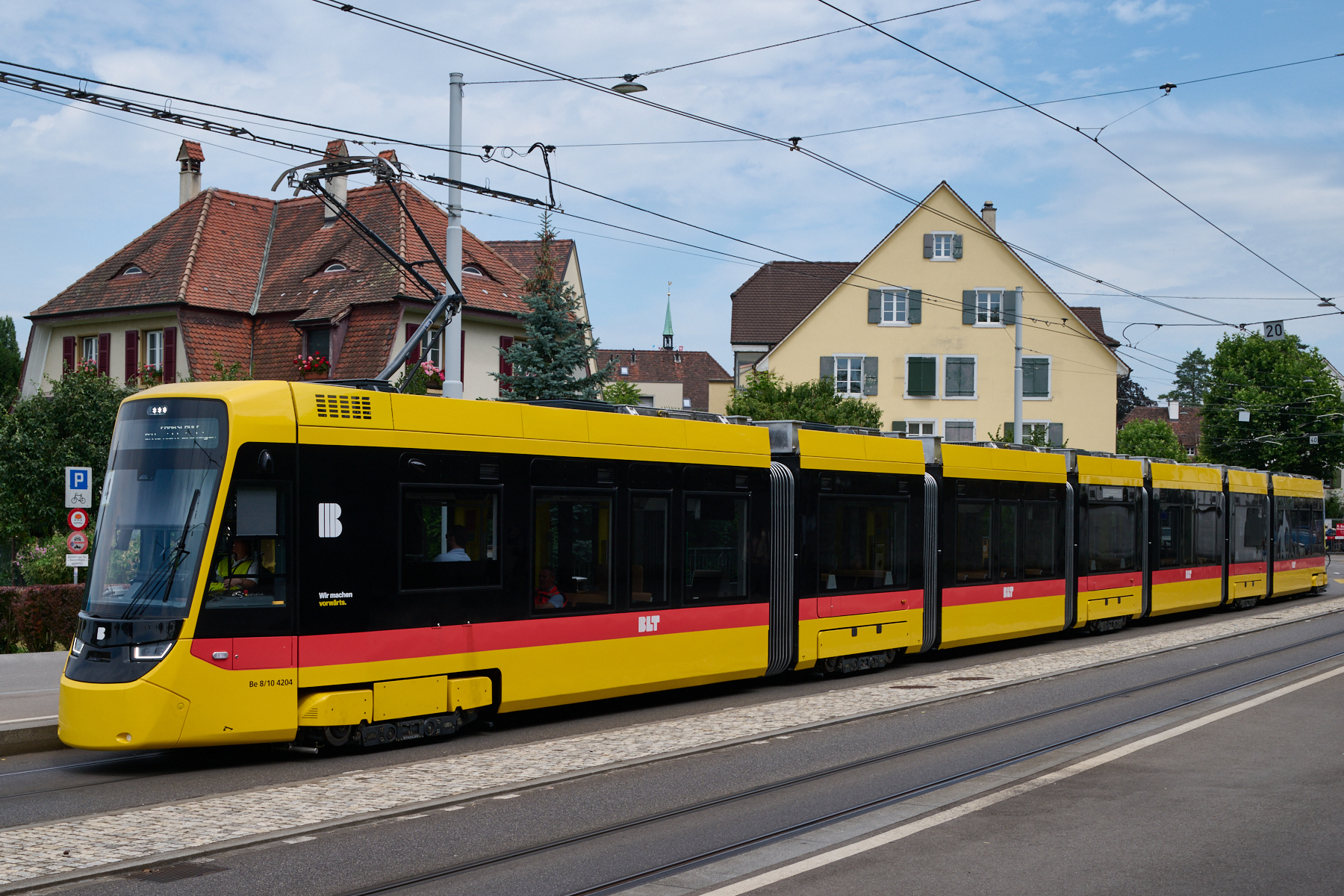
- TINA of the BLT in Basel
- Manufacturer: Stadler Rail
- Assembly: Bussnang, Switzerland
- Constructed: from 2022
- Number built: 31

Specifications
- Low-floor: 100%
- Track gauge: 1,000 mm (3 ft 3 3/8 in), 1,435 mm (4 ft 8 1/2 in)

TINA is a family of three-, five- and seven- section low-floor trams, mostly with suspended articulations and pivoting bogies. The trams are designed and produced by Stadler Rail, with the final assembly in Bussnang, Switzerland. TINA stems from the German term "Total Integrierter Niederflur-Antrieb"; in English "Totally Integrated Low-floor Drive". As of 2026, operators in eight European cities have ordered TINA trams.

== Operators ==
- Darmstadt (HEAG Mobilo), the first of 25 trams entered service late 2023.
- Basel (BLT), the first of 25 trams entered service in 2024.
- Rostock (RSAG), the first of 28 trams will enter service in 2025.
- Halle (HAVAG), the first of 56 trams will enter service in 2025.
- Den Haag (HTM), the first of 62 trams entered service in 2026.
- Gera (GVB), the first of 6 trams will enter service in 2026.
- Görlitz (GVB), an order for 8 trams was placed in 2026. It is part of a joint order with Zwickau (SVZ) for 14 trams.
- Zwickau (SVZ), an order for 6 trams was placed in 2026.
