= Justus Stöcklin =

Swiss teacher and writer

Justus Stöcklin (or Justin Stöcklin) (4 May 1860, Ettingen – 12 July 1943, Basel) was a Swiss teacher and writer. His books for primary school mathematics were widely used in Switzerland. He taught in Liestal.

In 2011, a biography was published.
