= Hochwald, Switzerland =

Hochwald
- Municipality
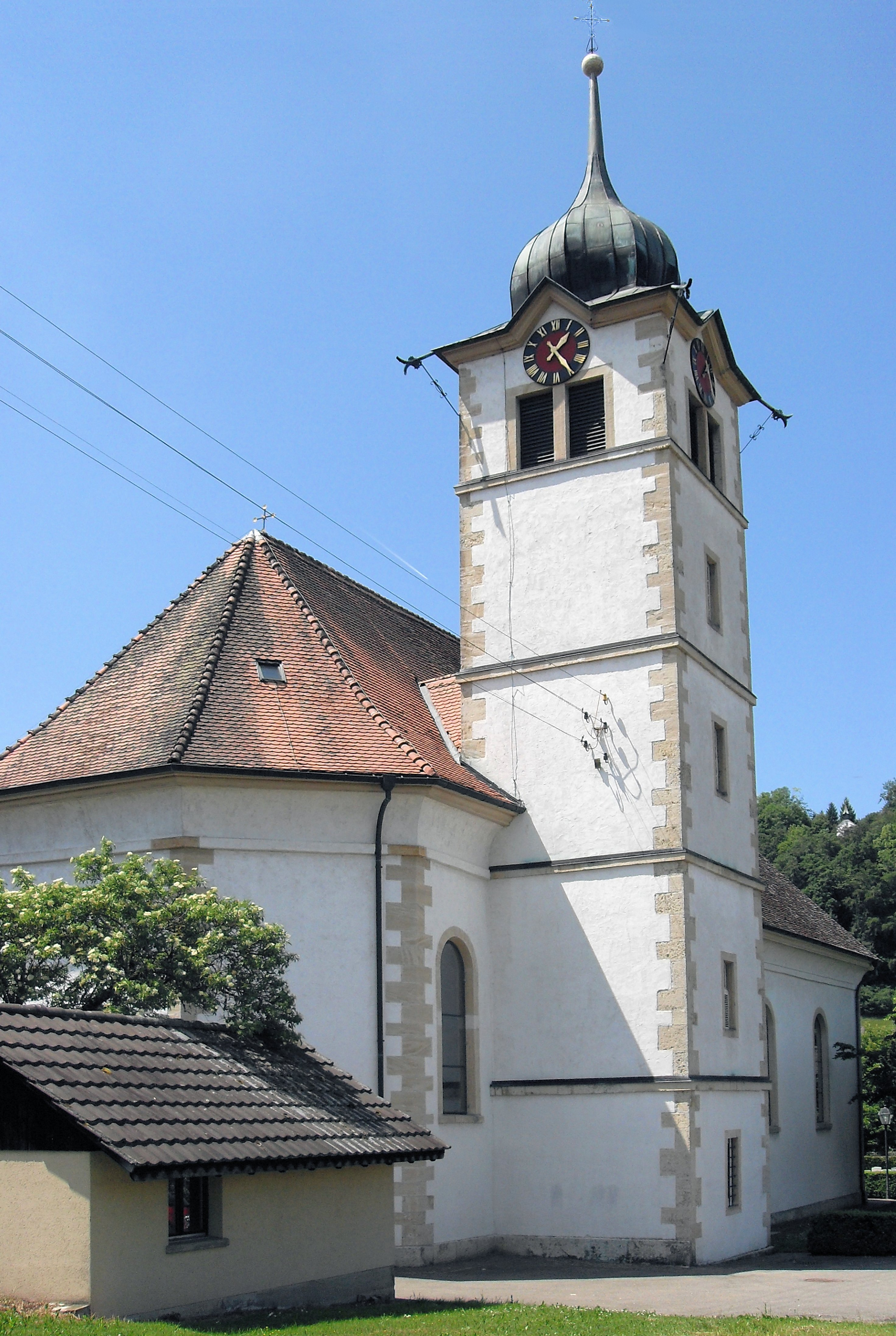

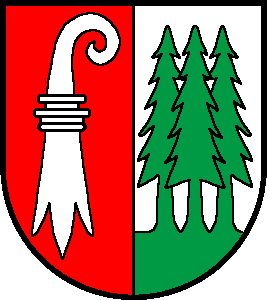
- Coat of arms
- Location of Hochwald
- Location within Switzerland Location within Canton of Solothurn
- Coordinates: 47°27′22″N 07°38′23″E
- Country: Switzerland
- Canton: Solothurn
- District: Dorneck

Area
  - Total: 8.32 km^{2} (3.21 sq mi)
- Elevation: 620 m (2,030 ft)

Population (December 2020)
  - Total: 1,275
  - Density: 153/km^{2} (397/sq mi)
- Time zone: UTC+01:00 (CET)
  - Summer (DST): UTC+02:00 (CEST)
- Postal code: 4146
- SFOS number: 2475
- ISO 3166 code: CH-SO
- Surrounded by: Büren, Dornach, Duggingen (BL), Gempen, Seewen
- Website: www.hochwald.ch

Hochwald (Swiss German: Hobel) is a municipality in the district of Dorneck in the canton of Solothurn in Switzerland. Hochwald means "high forest".

== History ==
Hochwald is first mentioned around 1225-26 as in villa Honwalt.

== Geography ==
Hochwald has an area, as of 2009, of 8.32 km^{2} (3.21 sq mi). Of this area, 3.81 km^{2} (1.47 sq mi) or 45.8% is used for agricultural purposes, while 3.73 km^{2} (1.44 sq mi) or 44.8% is forested. Of the rest of the land, 0.74 km^{2} (0.29 sq mi) or 8.9% is settled (buildings or roads).

Of the built up area, housing and buildings made up 4.6% and transportation infrastructure made up 3.0%. Out of the forested land, 43.1% of the total land area is heavily forested and 1.7% is covered with orchards or small clusters of trees. Of the agricultural land, 23.2% is used for growing crops and 19.4% is pastures, while 3.2% is used for orchards or vine crops.

The municipality is located in the Dorneck district, on the Gempen plateau. It consists of the linear village of Hochwald and the hamlets of Herrenmatt and Tiefenthal.

== Coat of arms ==
The blazon of the municipal coat of arms is Per pale Gules a Crozier sinister Argent and Argent three Fir Trees issuant from a Base Vert.

== Demographics ==
Hochwald has a population (as of December 2020) of 1,275. As of 2008, 7.8% of the population are resident foreign nationals. Over the last 10 years (1999–2009 ) the population has changed at a rate of 8.5%.

Most of the population (as of 2000) speaks German (1,097 or 97.6%), with Italian and French being the next most common at 6 or 0.5% each.

As of 2008, the gender distribution of the population was 48.1% male and 51.9% female. The population was made up of 535 Swiss men (43.1% of the population) and 62 (5.0%) non-Swiss men. There were 589 Swiss women (47.5%) and 54 (4.4%) non-Swiss women. Of the population in the municipality 353 or about 31.4% were born in Hochwald and lived there in 2000. There were 81 or 7.2% who were born in the same canton, while 523 or 46.5% were born somewhere else in Switzerland, and 133 or 11.8% were born outside of Switzerland.

In 2008, there were 8 live births to Swiss citizens and were 5 deaths of Swiss citizens. Ignoring immigration and emigration, the population of Swiss citizens increased by 3 while the foreign population remained the same. There were 2 Swiss men and 1 Swiss woman who emigrated from Switzerland. At the same time, there were 3 non-Swiss men and 5 non-Swiss women who immigrated from another country to Switzerland. The total Swiss population change in 2008 (from all sources, including moves across municipal borders) was a decrease of 10 and the non-Swiss population increased by 2 people. This represents a population growth rate of -0.7%.

The age distribution, as of 2000, in Hochwald is; 119 children or 10.6% of the population are between 0 and 6 years old and 206 teenagers or 18.3% are between 7 and 19. Of the adult population, 37 people or 3.3% of the population are between 20 and 24 years old. 342 people or 30.4% are between 25 and 44, and 302 people or 26.9% are between 45 and 64. The senior population distribution is 89 people or 7.9% of the population are between 65 and 79 years old and there are 29 people or 2.6% who are over 80.

As of 2000, there were 453 people who were single and never married in the municipality. There were 575 married individuals, 51 widows or widowers and 45 individuals who are divorced.

As of 2000, there were 427 private households in the municipality, and an average of 2.6 persons per household. There were 106 households that consist of only one person and 42 households with five or more people. Out of a total of 435 households that answered this question, 24.4% were households made up of just one person and there were 3 adults who lived with their parents. Of the rest of the households, there are 123 married couples without children, 171 married couples with children There were 21 single parents with a child or children. There were 3 households that were made up of unrelated people and 8 households that were made up of some sort of institution or another collective housing.

In 2000, there were 323 single family homes (or 77.6% of the total) out of a total of 416 inhabited buildings. There were 33 multi-family buildings (7.9%), along with 42 multi-purpose buildings that were mostly used for housing (10.1%) and 18 other use buildings (commercial or industrial) that also had some housing (4.3%). Of the single family homes, 31 were built before 1919, while 93 were built between 1990 and 2000. The greatest number of single family homes (79) were built between 1981 and 1990.

In 2000, there were 476 apartments in the municipality. The most common apartment size was 5 rooms of which there were 142. There were 10 single room apartments and 254 apartments with five or more rooms. Of these apartments, a total of 405 apartments (85.1% of the total) were permanently occupied, while 60 apartments (12.6%) were seasonally occupied and 11 apartments (2.3%) were empty. As of 2009, the construction rate of new housing units was 3.3 new units per 1,000 residents. The vacancy rate for the municipality, in 2010, was 1.15%.

The historical population is given in the following chart:

== Sights ==
The entire village of Hochwald is part of the Inventory of Swiss Heritage Sites.

== Politics ==
In the 2007 federal election, the most popular party was the CVP which received 25.63% of the vote. The next three most popular parties were the SVP (20.65%), the FDP (19.27%), and the Green Party (16.92%). In the federal election, a total of 502 votes were cast, and the voter turnout was 58.1%.

== Economy ==
As of 2010, Hochwald had an unemployment rate of 2.2%. As of 2008, there were 53 people employed in the primary economic sector and about 17 businesses involved in this sector. 17 people were employed in the secondary sector and there were 5 businesses in this sector. 117 people were employed in the tertiary sector, with 30 businesses in this sector. There were 566 residents of the municipality who were employed in some capacity, of which females made up 40.5% of the workforce.

In 2008, the total number of full-time equivalent jobs were 129. The number of jobs in the primary sector was 27, all of which were in agriculture. The number of jobs in the secondary sector was 16 of which 3 or (18.8%) were in manufacturing and 13 (81.3%) were in construction. The number of jobs in the tertiary sector was 86. In the tertiary sector; 7 or 8.1% were in wholesale or retail sales or the repair of motor vehicles, 17 or 19.8% were in the movement and storage of goods, 8 or 9.3% were in a hotel or restaurant, 4 or 4.7% were in the information industry, 19 or 22.1% were technical professionals or scientists, 6 or 7.0% were in education and 5 or 5.8% were in health care.

In 2000, there were 49 workers who commuted into the municipality and 434 workers who commuted away. The municipality is a net exporter of workers, with about 8.9 workers leaving the municipality for everyone entering. Of the working population, 15.4% used public transportation to get to work, and 63.3% used a private car.

== Religion ==
From the 2000 census, 541 or 48.1% were Roman Catholic, while 253 or 22.5% belonged to the Swiss Reformed Church. Of the rest of the population, there were 2 members of an Orthodox church (or about 0.18% of the population), there were 6 individuals (or about 0.53% of the population) who belonged to the Christian Catholic Church, and there were 46 individuals (or about 4.09% of the population) who belonged to another Christian church. There was 1 person who was Buddhist. 242 (or about 21.53% of the population) belonged to no church, are agnostic or atheist, and 33 individuals (or about 2.94% of the population) did not answer the question.

== Education ==
In Hochwald, about 441 or (39.2%) of the population have completed non-mandatory upper secondary education, and 175 or (15.6%) have completed additional higher education (either university or a Fachhochschule). Of the 175 who completed tertiary schooling, 68.0% were Swiss men, 17.7% were Swiss women, 8.6% were non-Swiss men and 5.7% were non-Swiss women.

During the 2010-2011 school year, there were a total of 115 students in the Hochwald school system. The education system in the Canton of Solothurn allows young children to attend two years of non-obligatory Kindergarten. During that school year, there were 27 children in kindergarten. The canton's school system requires students to attend six years of primary school, with some of the children attending smaller, specialized classes. In the municipality, there were 88 students in primary school. The secondary school program consists of three lower, obligatory years of schooling, followed by three to five years of optional, advanced schools. All the lower secondary students from Hochwald attend their school in a neighboring municipality.

As of 2000, there were 106 students from Hochwald who attended schools outside the municipality.
