= Biel-Benken =

- Municipality
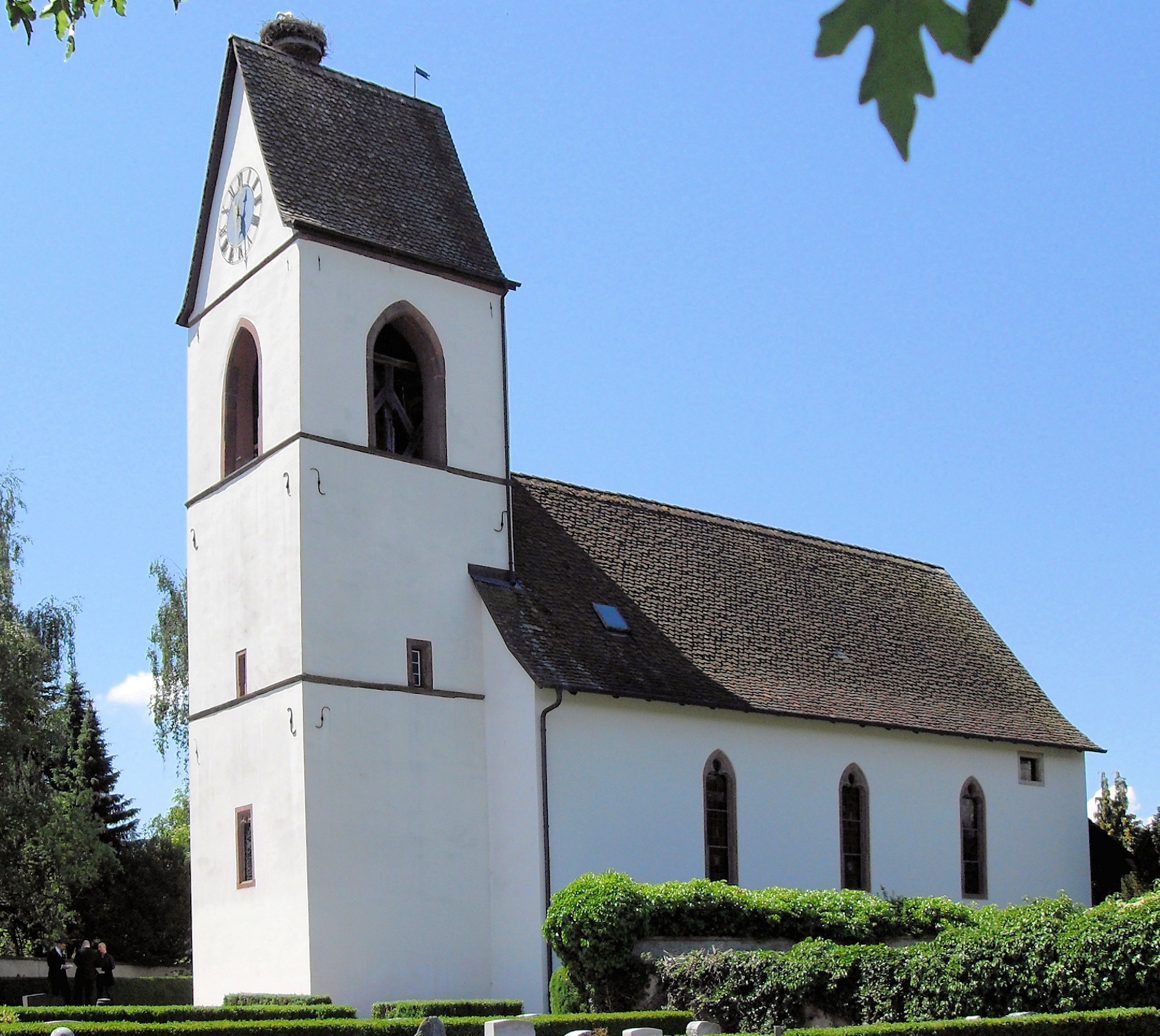

- Coat of arms
- Location of Biel-Benken
- Location within Switzerland Location within Canton of Basel-Landschaft
- Coordinates: 47°30′N 7°31′E
- Country: Switzerland
- Canton: Basel-Landschaft
- District: Arlesheim

Area
  - Total: 4.12 km^{2} (1.59 sq mi)
- Elevation: 317 m (1,040 ft)

Population (June 2021)
  - Total: 3,577
  - Density: 868/km^{2} (2,250/sq mi)
- Time zone: UTC+01:00 (CET)
  - Summer (DST): UTC+02:00 (CEST)
- Postal code: 4105
- SFOS number: 2764
- ISO 3166 code: CH-BL
- Surrounded by: Bättwil (SO), Leymen (FR-68), Neuwiller (FR-68), Oberwil, Therwil, Witterswil (SO)
- Website: www.biel-benken.ch

Biel-Benken (Swiss German: Biel-Bängge) is a municipality in the district of Arlesheim in the canton of Basel-Country in Switzerland.

== History ==
Benken is first mentioned in 1259 as Beinkon. It was also known as Benken maior to distinguish it from Biel which was known as Benken minor, Buelbenken or Benken inferior.

== Geography ==
Aerial view from 900 m by Walter Mittelholzer (1929)

Biel-Benken has an area, as of 2009, of 4.12 square kilometers (1.59 sq mi). Of this area, 2.22 km^{2} (0.86 sq mi) or 53.9% is used for agricultural purposes, while 0.82 km^{2} (0.32 sq mi) or 19.9% is forested. Of the rest of the land, 1.04 km^{2} (0.40 sq mi) or 25.2% is settled (buildings or roads) and 0.01 km^{2} (2.5 acres) or 0.2% is unproductive land.

Of the built up area, industrial buildings made up 1.2% of the total area while housing and buildings made up 17.0% and transportation infrastructure made up 4.4%. while parks, green belts and sports fields made up 1.9%. Out of the forested land, 18.4% of the total land area is heavily forested and 1.5% is covered with orchards or small clusters of trees. Of the agricultural land, 40.0% is used for growing crops and 6.1% is pastures, while 7.8% is used for orchards or vine crops.

The municipality is located in the Arlesheim district, in the Leimen valley. It consists of the two villages of Biel and Benken, which are separated by the Birsig river. The two villages merged in 1972.

== Coat of arms ==
The blazon of the municipal coat of arms is Gules, a bend lozengy Argent

== Demographics ==
Biel-Benken has a population (as of June 2021) of 3,577. As of 2008, 11.4% of the population are resident foreign nationals. Over the last 10 years (1997–2007) the population has changed at a rate of 25.5%.

Most of the population (as of 2000) speaks German (2,485 or 92.8%), with French being second most common (55 or 2.1%) and English being third (35 or 1.3%). There are 2 people who speak Romansh.

As of 2008, the gender distribution of the population was 50.2% male and 49.8% female. The population was made up of 2,746 Swiss citizens (87.9% of the population), and 377 non-Swiss residents (12.1%) Of the population in the municipality 492 or about 18.4% were born in Biel-Benken and lived there in 2000. There were 561 or 20.9% who were born in the same canton, while 1,178 or 44.0% were born somewhere else in Switzerland, and 364 or 13.6% were born outside of Switzerland.

In 2008 there were 22 live births to Swiss citizens and 2 births to non-Swiss citizens, and in same time span there were 17 deaths of Swiss citizens and 1 non-Swiss citizen death. Ignoring immigration and emigration, the population of Swiss citizens increased by 5 while the foreign population increased by 1. There were 3 Swiss men and 1 Swiss woman who emigrated from Switzerland. At the same time, there were 12 non-Swiss men and 17 non-Swiss women who immigrated from another country to Switzerland. The total Swiss population change in 2008 (from all sources, including moves across municipal borders) was a decrease of 10 and the non-Swiss population change was an increase of 26 people. This represents a population growth rate of 0.5%.

The age distribution, as of 2010, in Biel-Benken is; 230 children or 7.4% of the population are between 0 and 6 years old and 463 teenagers or 14.8% are between 7 and 19. Of the adult population, 270 people or 8.6% of the population are between 20 and 29 years old. 301 people or 9.6% are between 30 and 39, 573 people or 18.3% are between 40 and 49, and 706 people or 22.6% are between 50 and 64. The senior population distribution is 467 people or 15.0% of the population are between 65 and 79 years old and there are 113 people or 3.6% who are over 80.

As of 2000, there were 1,027 people who were single and never married in the municipality. There were 1,437 married individuals, 101 widows or widowers and 114 individuals who are divorced.

As of 2000, there were 1,054 private households in the municipality, and an average of 2.5 persons per household. There were 221 households that consist of only one person and 68 households with five or more people. Out of a total of 1,079 households that answered this question, 20.5% were households made up of just one person and 5 were adults who lived with their parents. Of the rest of the households, there are 386 married couples without children, 368 married couples with children There were 58 single parents with a child or children. There were 16 households that were made up unrelated people and 25 households that were made some sort of institution or another collective housing.

In 2000 there were 674 single family homes (or 80.1% of the total) out of a total of 841 inhabited buildings. There were 77 multi-family buildings (9.2%), along with 71 multi-purpose buildings that were mostly used for housing (8.4%) and 19 other use buildings (commercial or industrial) that also had some housing (2.3%). Of the single family homes 22 were built before 1919, while 124 were built between 1990 and 2000. The greatest number of single family homes (202) were built between 1971 and 1980.

In 2000 there were 1,082 apartments in the municipality. The most common apartment size was 5 rooms of which there were 335. There were 15 single room apartments and 582 apartments with five or more rooms. Of these apartments, a total of 1,018 apartments (94.1% of the total) were permanently occupied, while 48 apartments (4.4%) were seasonally occupied and 16 apartments (1.5%) were empty. As of 2007, the construction rate of new housing units was 4.2 new units per 1000 residents. As of 2000 the average price to rent a two-room apartment was about 1089.00 CHF (US$870, £490, €700), a three-room apartment was about 1428.00 CHF (US$1140, £640, €910) and a four-room apartment cost an average of 1685.00 CHF (US$1350, £760, €1080). The vacancy rate for the municipality, in 2008, was 0.32%.

The historical population is given in the following chart:

== Politics ==
In the 2007 federal election the most popular party was the SVP which received 25.53% of the vote. The next three most popular parties were the FDP (21.06%), the SP (20.98%) and the CVP (17.17%). In the federal election, a total of 1,203 votes were cast, and the voter turnout was 54.8%.

== Economy ==
As of 2007, Biel-Benken had an unemployment rate of 1.37%. As of 2005, there were 110 people employed in the primary economic sector and about 21 businesses involved in this sector. 343 people were employed in the secondary sector and there were 36 businesses in this sector. 425 people were employed in the tertiary sector, with 95 businesses in this sector. There were 1,381 residents of the municipality who were employed in some capacity, of which females made up 43.2% of the workforce.

In 2008 the total number of full-time equivalent jobs was 773. The number of jobs in the primary sector was 69, all of which were in agriculture. The number of jobs in the secondary sector was 345, of which 167 or (48.4%) were in manufacturing and 178 (51.6%) were in construction. The number of jobs in the tertiary sector was 359. In the tertiary sector; 132 or 36.8% were in wholesale or retail sales or the repair of motor vehicles, 15 or 4.2% were in the movement and storage of goods, 39 or 10.9% were in a hotel or restaurant, 9 or 2.5% were in the information industry, 4 or 1.1% were the insurance or financial industry, 58 or 16.2% were technical professionals or scientists, 12 or 3.3% were in education and 22 or 6.1% were in health care.

In 2000, there were 670 workers who commuted into the municipality and 1,078 workers who commuted away. The municipality is a net exporter of workers, with about 1.6 workers leaving the municipality for every one entering. About 23.4% of the workforce coming into Biel-Benken are coming from outside Switzerland. Of the working population, 19.7% used public transportation to get to work, and 53% used a private car.

== Religion ==
From the 2000 census, 656 or 24.5% were Roman Catholic, while 1,371 or 51.2% belonged to the Swiss Reformed Church. Of the rest of the population, there were 6 members of an Orthodox church (or about 0.22% of the population), there were 7 individuals (or about 0.26% of the population) who belonged to the Christian Catholic Church, and there were 56 individuals (or about 2.09% of the population) who belonged to another Christian church. There were 7 individuals (or about 0.26% of the population) who were Jewish, and 24 (or about 0.90% of the population) who were Islamic. There were 4 individuals who were Buddhist, 10 individuals who were Hindu and 5 individuals who belonged to another church. 458 (or about 17.10% of the population) belonged to no church, are agnostic or atheist, and 75 individuals (or about 2.80% of the population) did not answer the question.

== Education ==
In Biel-Benken about 1,135 or (42.4%) of the population have completed non-mandatory upper secondary education, and 596 or (22.2%) have completed additional higher education (either university or a Fachhochschule). Of the 596 who completed tertiary schooling, 60.6% were Swiss men, 28.2% were Swiss women, 6.4% were non-Swiss men and 4.9% were non-Swiss women. As of 2000, there were 3 students in Biel-Benken who came from another municipality, while 300 residents attended schools outside the municipality.

== Notable residents ==
- Alex Frei, a famous Swiss soccer player, was born and grew up in Biel-Benken.
