= Witterswil =

- Municipality
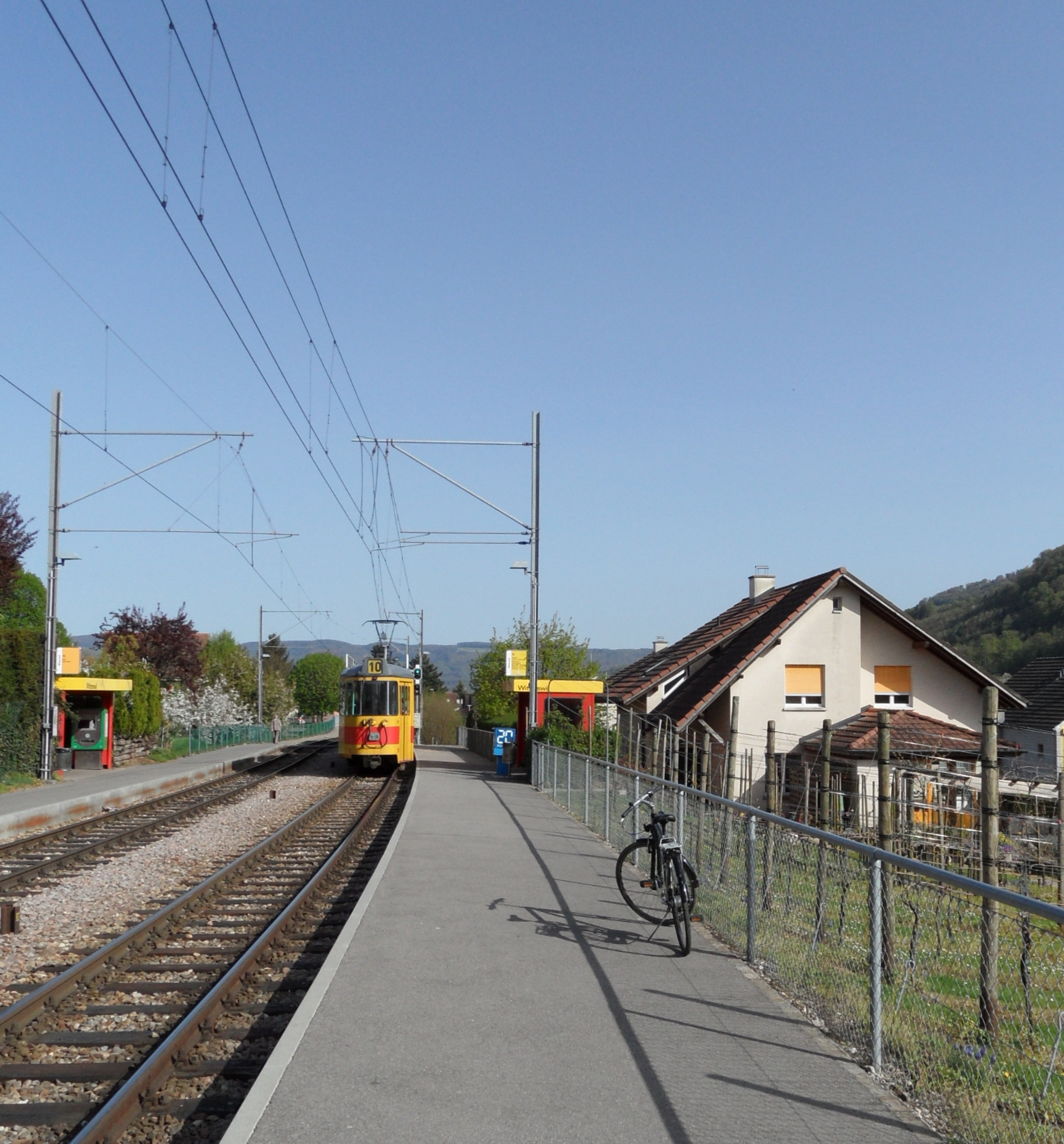

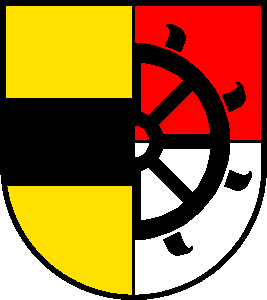
- Coat of arms
- Location of Witterswil
- Location within Switzerland Location within Canton of Solothurn
- Coordinates: 47°29′N 7°31′E
- Country: Switzerland
- Canton: Solothurn
- District: Dorneck

Area
  - Total: 2.67 km^{2} (1.03 sq mi)
- Elevation: 338 m (1,109 ft)

Population (December 2020)
  - Total: 1,450
  - Density: 543/km^{2} (1,410/sq mi)
- Time zone: UTC+01:00 (CET)
  - Summer (DST): UTC+02:00 (CEST)
- Postal code: 4108
- SFOS number: 2481
- ISO 3166 code: CH-SO
- Surrounded by: Bättwil, Biel-Benken (BL), Ettingen (BL), Hofstetten-Flüh, Therwil (BL)
- Website: www.witterswil.ch

Witterswil (Swiss German: Witterschwyl) is a municipality in the district of Dorneck in the canton of Solothurn in Switzerland.

== Geography ==
Aerial view (1950)

Witterswil has an area, as of 2009, of 2.67 square kilometers (1.03 sq mi). Of this area, 1.75 km^{2} (0.68 sq mi) or 65.5% is used for agricultural purposes, while 0.53 km^{2} (0.20 sq mi) or 19.9% is forested. Of the rest of the land, 0.37 km^{2} (0.14 sq mi) or 13.9% is settled (buildings or roads).

Of the built up area, industrial buildings made up 1.1% of the total area while housing and buildings made up 9.7% and transportation infrastructure made up 1.9%. Out of the forested land, 18.0% of the total land area is heavily forested and 1.9% is covered with orchards or small clusters of trees. Of the agricultural land, 46.8% is used for growing crops and 10.5% is pastures, while 8.2% is used for orchards or vine crops.

== Coat of arms ==
The blazon of the municipal coat of arms is Per pale Or a Fess Sable and per fess Gules and Argent overall a Semi-Wheel of St. Catherine dimidiated.

== Demographics ==
Witterswil has a population (as of December 2020) of 1,450. As of 2008, 11.0% of the population are resident foreign nationals. Over the last 10 years (1999–2009 ) the population has changed at a rate of 2%.

Most of the population (as of 2000) speaks German (1,182 or 91.6%), with French being second most common (30 or 2.3%) and Italian being third (27 or 2.1%).

As of 2008, the gender distribution of the population was 50.1% male and 49.9% female. The population was made up of 586 Swiss men (43.0% of the population) and 96 (7.0%) non-Swiss men. There were 595 Swiss women (43.7%) and 85 (6.2%) non-Swiss women. Of the population in the municipality 260 or about 20.2% were born in Witterswil and lived there in 2000. There were 63 or 4.9% who were born in the same canton, while 744 or 57.7% were born somewhere else in Switzerland, and 199 or 15.4% were born outside of Switzerland.

In 2008 there were 8 live births to Swiss citizens and 1 birth to non-Swiss citizens, and in same time span there were 6 deaths of Swiss citizens and 1 non-Swiss citizen death. Ignoring immigration and emigration, the population of Swiss citizens increased by 2 while the foreign population remained the same. There were 2 Swiss men and 1 Swiss woman who immigrated back to Switzerland. At the same time, there were 3 non-Swiss men and 1 non-Swiss woman who immigrated from another country to Switzerland. The total Swiss population change in 2008 (from all sources, including moves across municipal borders) was an increase of 22 and the non-Swiss population increased by 10 people. This represents a population growth rate of 2.4%.

The age distribution, as of 2000, in Witterswil is; 96 children or 7.4% of the population are between 0 and 6 years old and 239 teenagers or 18.5% are between 7 and 19. Of the adult population, 49 people or 3.8% of the population are between 20 and 24 years old. 366 people or 28.4% are between 25 and 44, and 383 people or 29.7% are between 45 and 64. The senior population distribution is 134 people or 10.4% of the population are between 65 and 79 years old and there are 23 people or 1.8% who are over 80.

As of 2000, there were 497 people who were single and never married in the municipality. There were 704 married individuals, 38 widows or widowers and 51 individuals who are divorced.

As of 2000, there were 490 private households in the municipality, and an average of 2.6 persons per household. There were 95 households that consist of only one person and 39 households with five or more people. Out of a total of 499 households that answered this question, 19.0% were households made up of just one person and there were 2 adults who lived with their parents. Of the rest of the households, there are 168 married couples without children, 197 married couples with children There were 25 single parents with a child or children. There were 3 households that were made up of unrelated people and 9 households that were made up of some sort of institution or another collective housing.

In 2000 there were 352 single family homes (or 82.4% of the total) out of a total of 427 inhabited buildings. There were 34 multi-family buildings (8.0%), along with 33 multi-purpose buildings that were mostly used for housing (7.7%) and 8 other use buildings (commercial or industrial) that also had some housing (1.9%). Of the single family homes 16 were built before 1919, while 74 were built between 1990 and 2000. The greatest number of single family homes (95) were built between 1961 and 1970.

In 2000 there were 524 apartments in the municipality. The most common apartment size was 5 rooms of which there were 175. There were 7 single room apartments and 256 apartments with five or more rooms. Of these apartments, a total of 481 apartments (91.8% of the total) were permanently occupied, while 33 apartments (6.3%) were seasonally occupied and 10 apartments (1.9%) were empty. As of 2009, the construction rate of new housing units was 2.2 new units per 1000 residents. The vacancy rate for the municipality, in 2010, was 0.36%.

The historical population is given in the following chart:

== Politics ==
In the 2007 federal election the most popular party was the SVP which received 25.89% of the vote. The next three most popular parties were the CVP (20.98%), the SP (19.67%) and the Green Party (15.51%). In the federal election, a total of 485 votes were cast, and the voter turnout was 50.7%.

== Economy ==
As of 2010, Witterswil had an unemployment rate of 1.9%. As of 2008, there were 26 people employed in the primary economic sector and about 9 businesses involved in this sector. 133 people were employed in the secondary sector and there were 15 businesses in this sector. 212 people were employed in the tertiary sector, with 40 businesses in this sector. There were 659 residents of the municipality who were employed in some capacity, of which females made up 40.8% of the workforce.

In 2008 the total number of full-time equivalent jobs was 292. The number of jobs in the primary sector was 14, all of which were in agriculture. The number of jobs in the secondary sector was 122 of which 108 or (88.5%) were in manufacturing and 15 (12.3%) were in construction. The number of jobs in the tertiary sector was 156. In the tertiary sector; 19 or 12.2% were in wholesale or retail sales or the repair of motor vehicles, 1 was in the movement and storage of goods, 5 or 3.2% were in a hotel or restaurant, 4 or 2.6% were in the information industry, 5 or 3.2% were the insurance or financial industry, 79 or 50.6% were technical professionals or scientists, 26 or 16.7% were in education and 3 or 1.9% were in health care.

In 2000, there were 138 workers who commuted into the municipality and 555 workers who commuted away. The municipality is a net exporter of workers, with about 4.0 workers leaving the municipality for every one entering. About 15.2% of the workforce coming into Witterswil are coming from outside Switzerland, while 0.2% of the locals commute out of Switzerland for work. Of the working population, 38.7% used public transportation to get to work, and 45.7% used a private car.

== Religion ==
From the 2000 census, 516 or 40.0% were Roman Catholic, while 404 or 31.3% belonged to the Swiss Reformed Church. Of the rest of the population, there were 6 members of an Orthodox church (or about 0.47% of the population), there were 6 individuals (or about 0.47% of the population) who belonged to the Christian Catholic Church, and there were 24 individuals (or about 1.86% of the population) who belonged to another Christian church. There were 12 (or about 0.93% of the population) who were Islamic. There were 3 individuals who were Buddhist and 1 person who was Hindu. 294 (or about 22.79% of the population) belonged to no church, are agnostic or atheist, and 24 individuals (or about 1.86% of the population) did not answer the question.

== Education ==
In Witterswil about 532 or (41.2%) of the population have completed non-mandatory upper secondary education, and 245 or (19.0%) have completed additional higher education (either university or a Fachhochschule). Of the 245 who completed tertiary schooling, 64.9% were Swiss men, 28.6% were Swiss women, 4.1% were non-Swiss men and 2.4% were non-Swiss women.

As of 2000, there were 80 students in Witterswil who came from another municipality, while 138 residents attended schools outside the municipality.

Witterswil is home to the Institut für Pharmazeutische Biologie (Institute for Pharmaceutical Biology) library. The library has (as of 2008) 395 books or other media. It was open a total of 250 days with average of 42 hours per week during that year.
