= Bättwil =

- Municipality
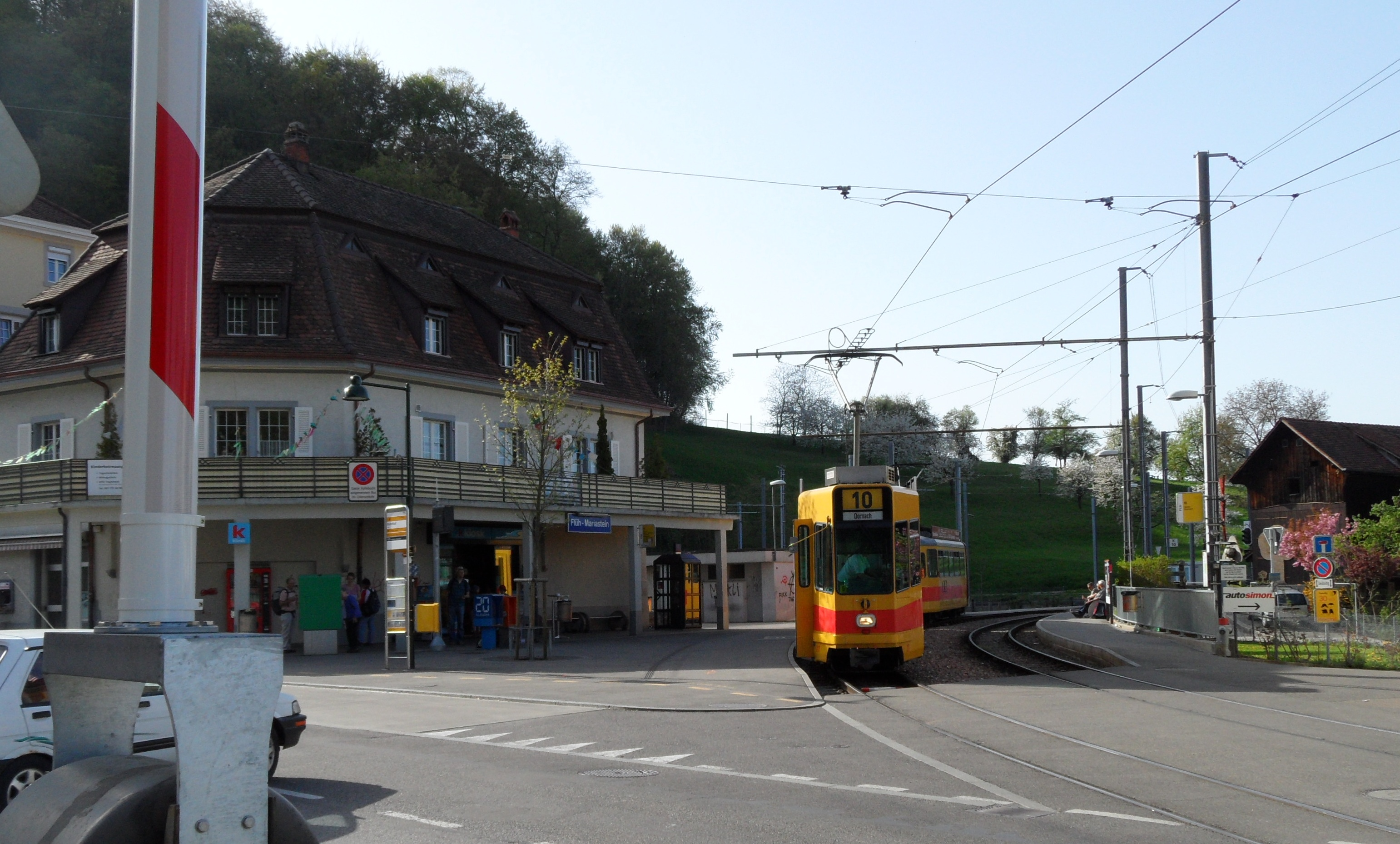

- Coat of arms
- Location of Bättwil
- Location within Switzerland Location within Canton of Solothurn
- Coordinates: 47°30′N 7°31′E
- Country: Switzerland
- Canton: Solothurn
- District: Dorneck

Area
  - Total: 1.67 km^{2} (0.64 sq mi)
- Elevation: 360 m (1,180 ft)
- Highest elevation (Bättwilerberg): 530 m (1,740 ft)

Population (December 2020)
  - Total: 1,188
  - Density: 711/km^{2} (1,840/sq mi)
- Time zone: UTC+01:00 (CET)
  - Summer (DST): UTC+02:00 (CEST)
- Postal code: 4112
- SFOS number: 2471
- ISO 3166 code: CH-SO
- Surrounded by: Biel-Benken (BL), Hofstetten-Flüh, Leymen (FR-68), Witterswil
- Website: www.baettwil.ch

Bättwil (German pronunciation: [ˈbɛtˌviːl]) is a municipality in the district of Dorneck in the canton of Solothurn in Switzerland.

== History ==
Bättwil is first mentioned around 1244-45 as Betwilre.

== Geography ==
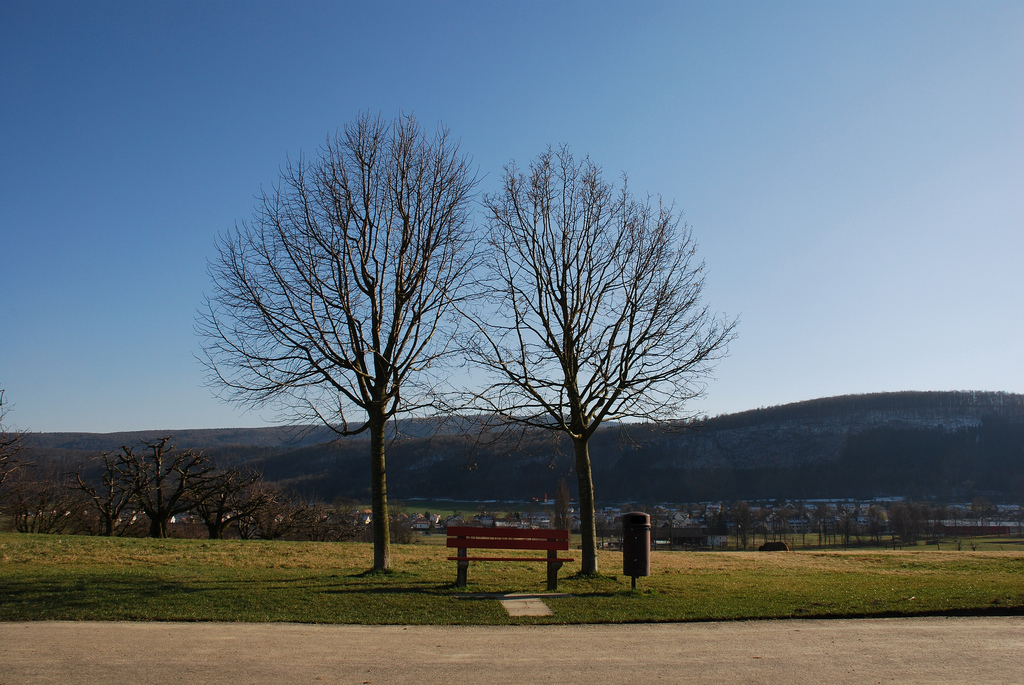
Bättwil

Bättwil has an area, as of 2009, of 1.67 square kilometers (0.64 sq mi). Of this area, 0.97 km^{2} (0.37 sq mi) or 58.1% is used for agricultural purposes, while 0.3 km^{2} (0.12 sq mi) or 18.0% is forested. Of the rest of the land, 0.42 km^{2} (0.16 sq mi) or 25.1% is settled (buildings or roads).

Of the built up area, industrial buildings made up 3.0% of the total area while housing and buildings made up 14.4% and transportation infrastructure made up 4.2%. while parks, green belts and sports fields made up 3.0%. Out of the forested land, 16.2% of the total land area is heavily forested and 1.8% is covered with orchards or small clusters of trees. Of the agricultural land, 38.3% is used for growing crops and 12.6% is pastures, while 7.2% is used for orchards or vine crops.

The municipality is located in the Dorneck district. It is part of the exclave of Leimental, on the French border.

== Coat of arms ==
The blazon of the municipal coat of arms is Per fess Gules and Argent a Crozier counterchanged.

== Demographics ==
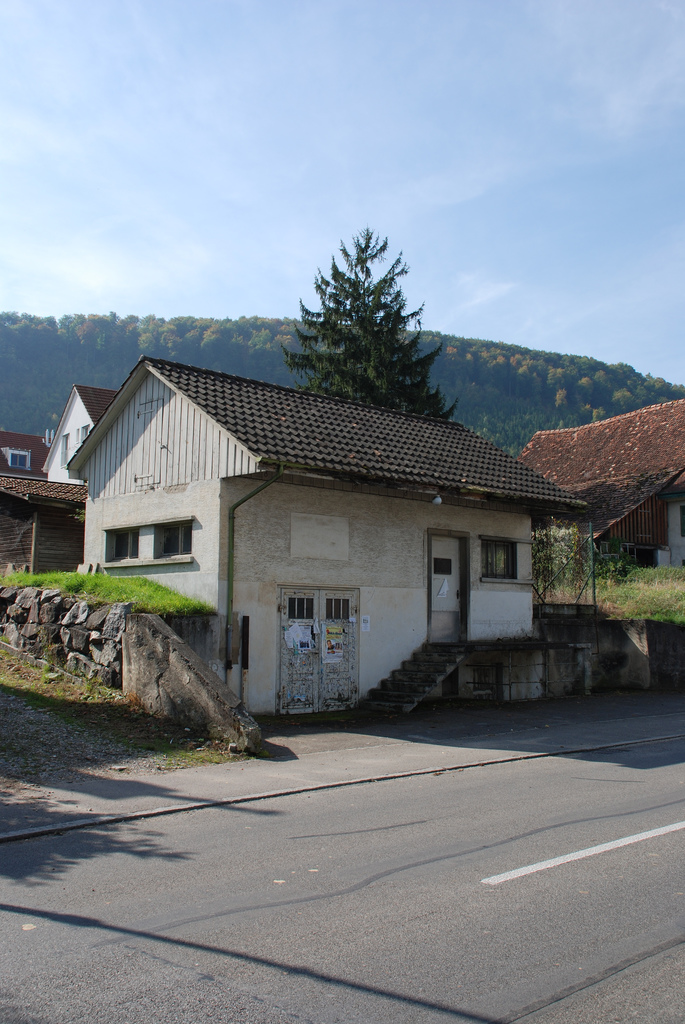
Bättwil village

Bättwil has a population (as of December 2020) of 1,188. As of 2008, 12.5% of the population are resident foreign nationals. Over the last 10 years (1999–2009 ) the population has changed at a rate of 30.4%.

Most of the population (as of 2000) speaks German (877 or 89.9%), with English being second most common (27 or 2.8%) and Italian being third (23 or 2.4%). There are 21 people who speak French.

As of 2008, the gender distribution of the population was 49.6% male and 50.4% female. The population was made up of 489 Swiss men (41.7% of the population) and 92 (7.8%) non-Swiss men. There were 503 Swiss women (42.9%) and 88 (7.5%) non-Swiss women. Of the population in the municipality 185 or about 19.0% were born in Bättwil and lived there in 2000. There were 91 or 9.3% who were born in the same canton, while 542 or 55.5% were born somewhere else in Switzerland, and 138 or 14.1% were born outside of Switzerland.

In 2008 there were 9 live births to Swiss citizens and 1 birth to non-Swiss citizens, and in same time span there were 4 deaths of Swiss citizens. Ignoring immigration and emigration, the population of Swiss citizens increased by 5 while the foreign population increased by 1. There was 1 Swiss man and 1 Swiss woman who immigrated back to Switzerland. At the same time, there were 3 non-Swiss men and 4 non-Swiss women who emigrated from Switzerland to another country. The total Swiss population change in 2008 (from all sources, including moves across municipal borders) was a decrease of 13 and the non-Swiss population decreased by 5 people. This represents a population growth rate of -1.5%.

The age distribution, as of 2000, in Bättwil is; 94 children or 9.6% of the population are between 0 and 6 years old and 194 teenagers or 19.9% are between 7 and 19. Of the adult population, 32 people or 3.3% of the population are between 20 and 24 years old. 353 people or 36.2% are between 25 and 44, and 226 people or 23.2% are between 45 and 64. The senior population distribution is 65 people or 6.7% of the population are between 65 and 79 years old and there are 12 people or 1.2% who are over 80.

As of 2000, there were 411 people who were single and never married in the municipality. There were 501 married individuals, 24 widows or widowers and 40 individuals who are divorced.

As of 2000, there were 367 private households in the municipality, and an average of 2.6 persons per household. There were 80 households that consist of only one person and 30 households with five or more people. Out of a total of 371 households that answered this question, 21.6% were households made up of just one person and there were 2 adults who lived with their parents. Of the rest of the households, there are 104 married couples without children, 150 married couples with children There were 25 single parents with a child or children. There were 6 households that were made up of unrelated people and 4 households that were made up of some sort of institution or another collective housing.

In 2000 there were 201 single family homes (or 75.0% of the total) out of a total of 268 inhabited buildings. There were 31 multi-family buildings (11.6%), along with 21 multi-purpose buildings that were mostly used for housing (7.8%) and 15 other use buildings (commercial or industrial) that also had some housing (5.6%). Of the single family homes 7 were built before 1919, while 114 were built between 1990 and 2000. The greatest number of single family homes (60) were built between 1991 and 1995.

In 2000 there were 378 apartments in the municipality. The most common apartment size was 5 rooms of which there were 129. There were 4 single room apartments and 187 apartments with five or more rooms. Of these apartments, a total of 346 apartments (91.5% of the total) were permanently occupied, while 21 apartments (5.6%) were seasonally occupied and 11 apartments (2.9%) were empty. As of 2009, the construction rate of new housing units was 13.9 new units per 1000 residents. The vacancy rate for the municipality, in 2010, was 1.07%.

The historical population is given in the following chart:

== Politics ==
In the 2007 federal election the most popular party was the SVP which received 32.08% of the vote. The next three most popular parties were the SP (23.28%), the CVP (17.6%) and the Green Party (12.73%). In the federal election, a total of 360 votes were cast, and the voter turnout was 46.9%.

== Economy ==
As of 2010, Bättwil had an unemployment rate of 3.5%. As of 2008, there were 33 people employed in the primary economic sector and about 7 businesses involved in this sector. 255 people were employed in the secondary sector and there were 15 businesses in this sector. 292 people were employed in the tertiary sector, with 50 businesses in this sector. There were 517 residents of the municipality who were employed in some capacity, of which females made up 42.4% of the workforce.

In 2008 the total number of full-time equivalent jobs was 487. The number of jobs in the primary sector was 26, all of which were in agriculture. The number of jobs in the secondary sector was 245 of which 214 or (87.3%) were in manufacturing and 30 (12.2%) were in construction. The number of jobs in the tertiary sector was 216. In the tertiary sector; 61 or 28.2% were in wholesale or retail sales or the repair of motor vehicles, 13 or 6.0% were in the movement and storage of goods, 35 or 16.2% were in a hotel or restaurant, 1 was in the information industry, 13 or 6.0% were technical professionals or scientists, 39 or 18.1% were in education and 6 or 2.8% were in health care.

In 2000, there were 557 workers who commuted into the municipality and 411 workers who commuted away. The municipality is a net importer of workers, with about 1.4 workers entering the municipality for every one leaving. About 31.8% of the workforce coming into Bättwil are coming from outside Switzerland. Of the working population, 36.2% used public transportation to get to work, and 43.9% used a private car.

== Religion ==
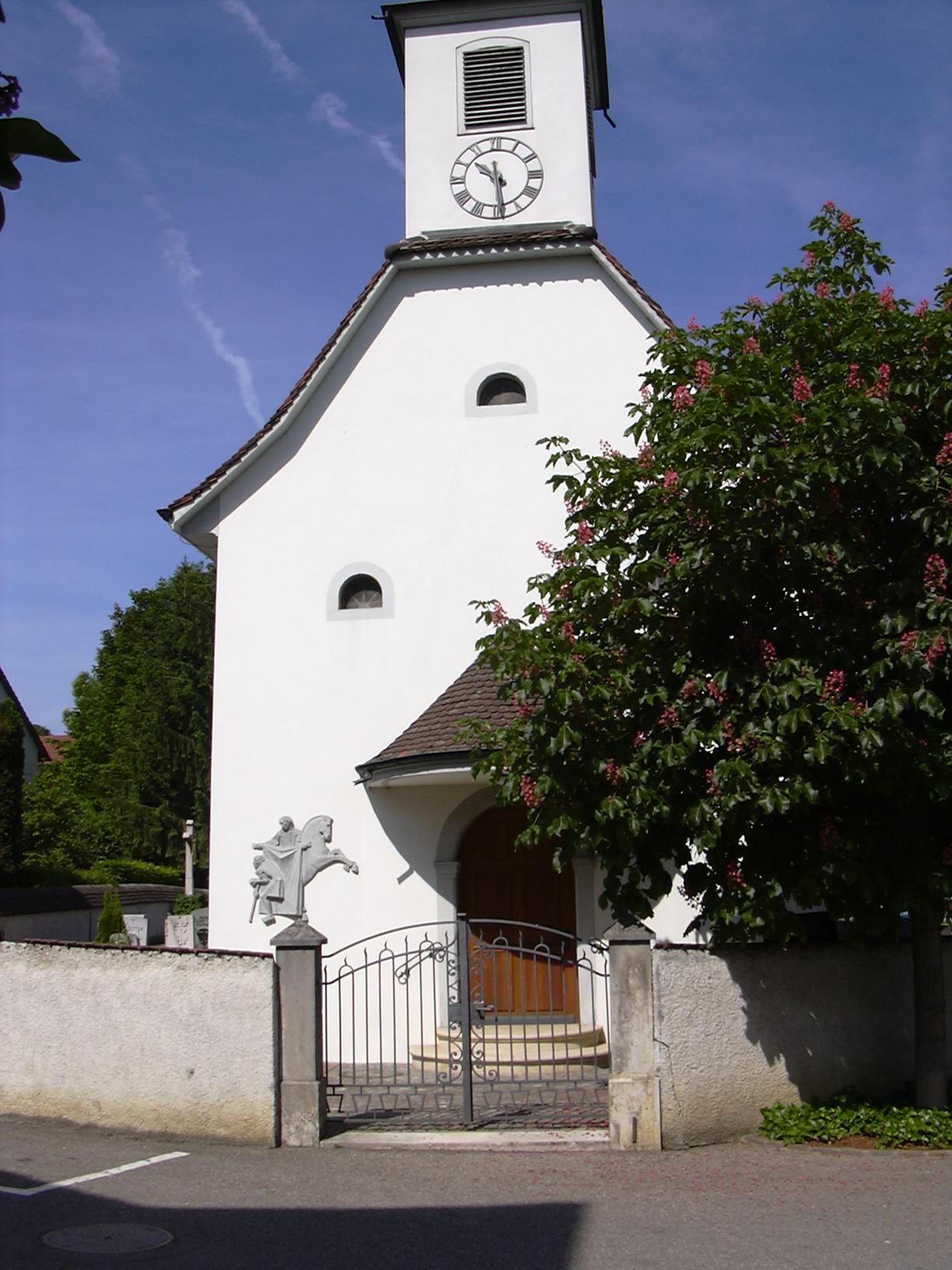
Church of St. Martin in Bättwil

From the 2000 census, 407 or 41.7% were Roman Catholic, while 284 or 29.1% belonged to the Swiss Reformed Church. Of the rest of the population, there were 5 individuals (or about 0.51% of the population) who belonged to the Christian Catholic Church, and there were 19 individuals (or about 1.95% of the population) who belonged to another Christian church. There were 10 (or about 1.02% of the population) who were Islamic. There were 3 individuals who were Buddhist, 3 individuals who were Hindu and 2 individuals who belonged to another church. 228 (or about 23.36% of the population) belonged to no church, are agnostic or atheist, and 15 individuals (or about 1.54% of the population) did not answer the question.

== Education ==
In Bättwil about 418 or (42.8%) of the population have completed non-mandatory upper secondary education, and 148 or (15.2%) have completed additional higher education (either university or a Fachhochschule). Of the 148 who completed tertiary schooling, 62.8% were Swiss men, 23.0% were Swiss women, 10.1% were non-Swiss men and 4.1% were non-Swiss women.

As of 2000, there were 323 students in Bättwil who came from another municipality, while 125 residents attended schools outside the municipality.
