= Dorneck District =

District in the canton of Solothurn in Switzerland

Coordinates: 47°28′45″N 7°37′05″E

Dorneck District is one of the ten districts of the canton of Solothurn in Switzerland, situated to the north of the canton. Together with Thierstein District, it forms the Amtei (electoral district) of Dorneck-Thierstein. It has a population of 20,802 (as of 31 December 2020). Five of the district's eleven municipalities are exclaves within the canton of Basel-Country, with some bordering France.

== Municipalities ==
Dorneck District contains the following municipalities:

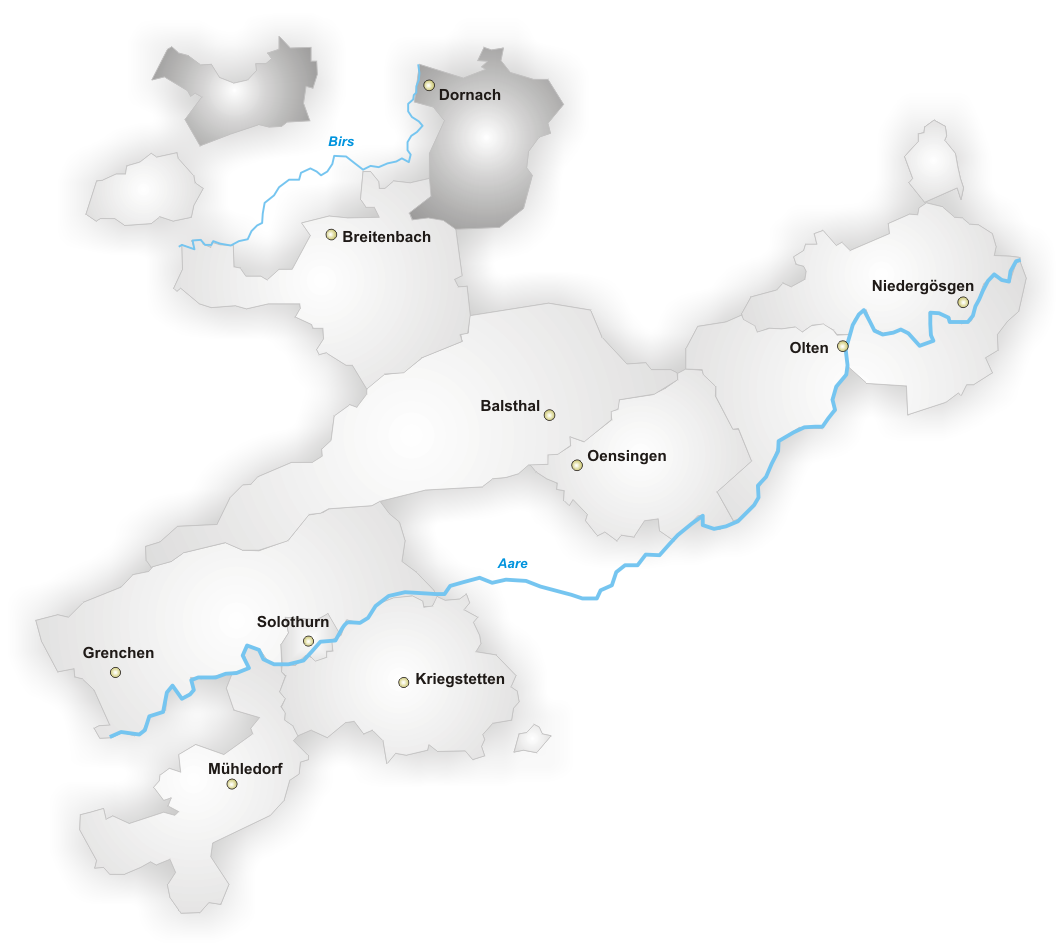
Dorneck District, canton of Solothurn

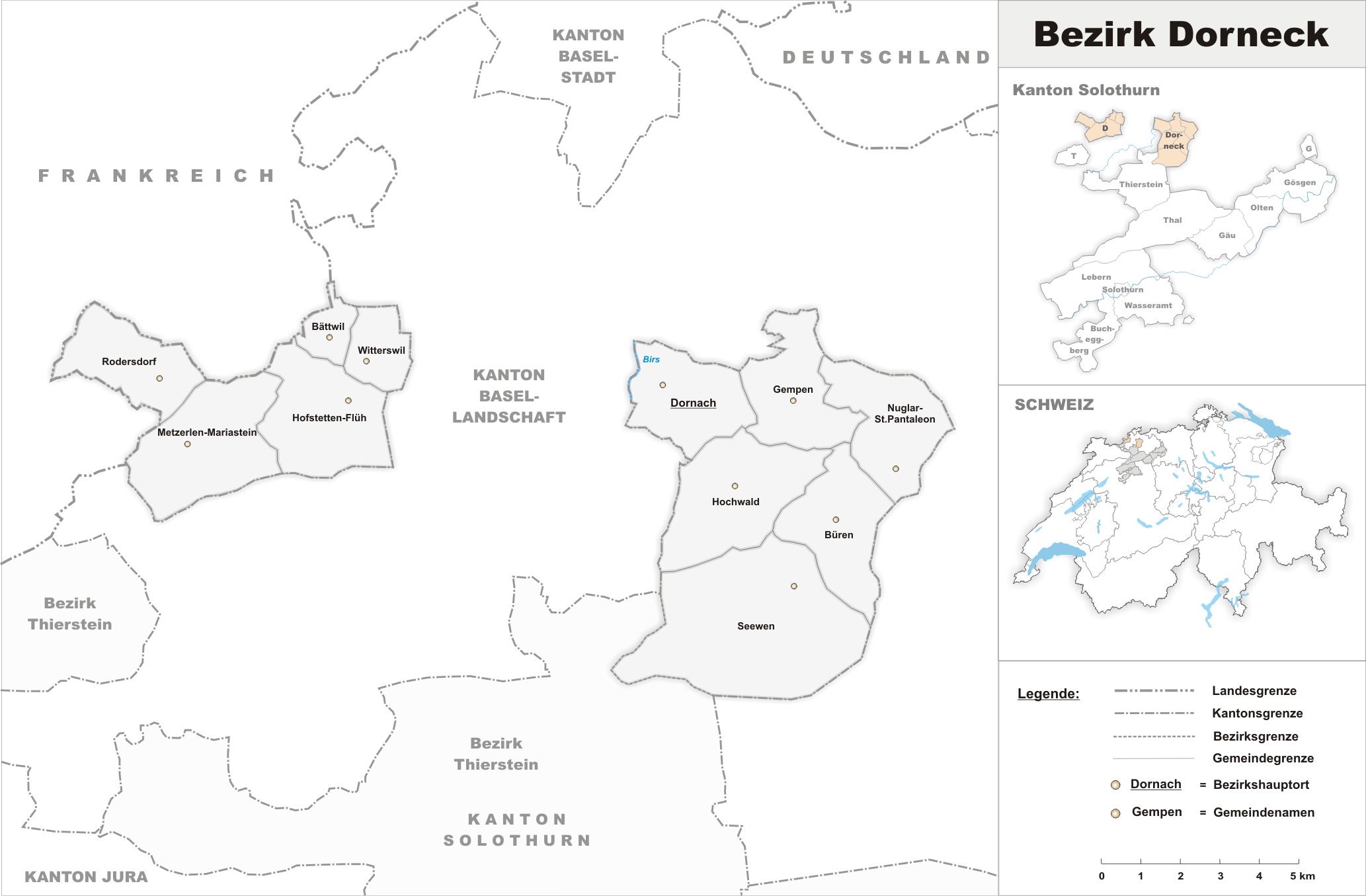
Municipalities of Dorneck District

Coat of arms	Municipality	Population (31 December 2020)	Area, km^{2}
Bättwil	Bättwil	1,188	1.69
Büren SO	Büren	1,046	6.22
Dornach	Dornach	6,882	5.75
Gempen	Gempen	904	5.96
Hochwald	Hochwald	1,275	8.28
Hofstetten-Flüh	Hofstetten-Flüh	3,206	7.50
Metzerlen-Mariastein	Metzerlen-Mariastein	938	8.56
Nuglar-St. Pantaleon	Nuglar-St. Pantaleon	1,516	6.34
Rodersdorf	Rodersdorf	1,375	5.29
Seewen	Seewen	1,022	16.39
Witterswil	Witterswil	1,450	2.65
	Total	20,802	74.63

== Mergers and name changes ==
On 1 January 1986 the municipality of Hofstetten (SO) changed its name to Hofstetten-Flüh.

== Geography ==
Dorneck has an area, as of 2009, of 74.64 square kilometers (28.82 sq mi). Of this area, 32.99 km^{2} (12.74 sq mi) or 44.2% is used for agricultural purposes, while 32.89 km^{2} (12.70 sq mi) or 44.1% is forested. Of the rest of the land, 8.59 km^{2} (3.32 sq mi) or 11.5% is settled (buildings or roads), 0.13 km^{2} (32 acres) or 0.2% is either rivers or lakes and 0.04 km^{2} (9.9 acres) or 0.1% is unproductive land.

Of the built up area, housing and buildings made up 7.1% and transportation infrastructure made up 2.9%. Out of the forested land, 41.7% of the total land area is heavily forested and 2.3% is covered with orchards or small clusters of trees. Of the agricultural land, 37.8% is used for growing crops, while 6.0% is used for orchards or vine crops. All the water in the district is flowing water.

== Coat of arms ==
Coat of Arms

The blazon of the municipal coat of arms is Argent two Fish-hooks inverted and addorsed Sable.

== Demographics ==
Dorneck has a population (as of December 2020) of 20,802

Most of the population (as of 2000) speaks German (16,601 or 92.3%), with Italian being second most common (245 or 1.4%) and French being third (234 or 1.3%). There are 9 people who speak Romansh.

As of 2008, the gender distribution of the population was 48.7% male and 51.3% female. The population was made up of 7,911 Swiss men (40.5% of the population) and 1,603 (8.2%) non-Swiss men. There were 8,446 Swiss women (43.3%) and 1,568 (8.0%) non-Swiss women. Of the population in the district 4,863 or about 27.0% were born in Dorneck and lived there in 2000. There were 1,178 or 6.6% who were born in the same canton, while 8,211 or 45.7% were born somewhere else in Switzerland, and 3,171 or 17.6% were born outside of Switzerland.

In 2008 there were 138 live births to Swiss citizens and 22 births to non-Swiss citizens, and in same time span there were 102 deaths of Swiss citizens and 7 non-Swiss citizen deaths. Ignoring immigration and emigration, the population of Swiss citizens increased by 36 while the foreign population increased by 15. There were 5 Swiss men who immigrated back to Switzerland and 15 Swiss women who emigrated from Switzerland. At the same time, there were 73 non-Swiss men and 29 non-Swiss women who immigrated from another country to Switzerland. The total Swiss population change in 2008 (from all sources, including moves across municipal borders) was an increase of 21 and the non-Swiss population increased by 99 people. This represents a population growth rate of 0.6%.

As of 2000, there were 7,349 people who were single and never married in the district. There were 8,940 married individuals, 801 widows or widowers and 888 individuals who are divorced.

There were 2,056 households that consist of only one person and 538 households with five or more people. Out of a total of 7,429 households that answered this question, 27.7% were households made up of just one person and 47 were adults who lived with their parents. Of the rest of the households, there are 2,251 married couples without children, 2,412 married couples with children There were 394 single parents with a child or children. There were 105 households that were made up unrelated people and 164 households that were made some sort of institution or another collective housing.

The historical population is given in the following chart:

== Politics ==
In the 2007 federal election the most popular party was the SVP which received 24.07% of the vote. The next three most popular parties were the SP (21.61%), the CVP (18.43%) and the FDP (17.18%). In the federal election, a total of 6,941 votes were cast, and the voter turnout was 52.9%.

== Religion ==
From the 2000 census, 7,644 or 42.5% were Roman Catholic, while 4,510 or 25.1% belonged to the Swiss Reformed Church. Of the rest of the population, there were 103 members of an Orthodox church (or about 0.57% of the population), there were 65 individuals (or about 0.36% of the population) who belonged to the Christian Catholic Church, and there were 654 individuals (or about 3.64% of the population) who belonged to another Christian church. There were 4 individuals (or about 0.02% of the population) who were Jewish, and 276 (or about 1.54% of the population) who were Islamic. There were 37 individuals who were Buddhist, 73 individuals who were Hindu and 21 individuals who belonged to another church. 3,968 (or about 22.07% of the population) belonged to no church, are agnostic or atheist, and 623 individuals (or about 3.47% of the population) did not answer the question.

== Education ==
In Dorneck about 7,098 or (39.5%) of the population have completed non-mandatory upper secondary education, and 3,166 or (17.6%) have completed additional higher education (either University or a Fachhochschule). Of the 3,166 who completed tertiary schooling, 55.7% were Swiss men, 24.4% were Swiss women, 10.7% were non-Swiss men and 9.3% were non-Swiss women.
