= Hofstetten-Flüh =

- Municipality
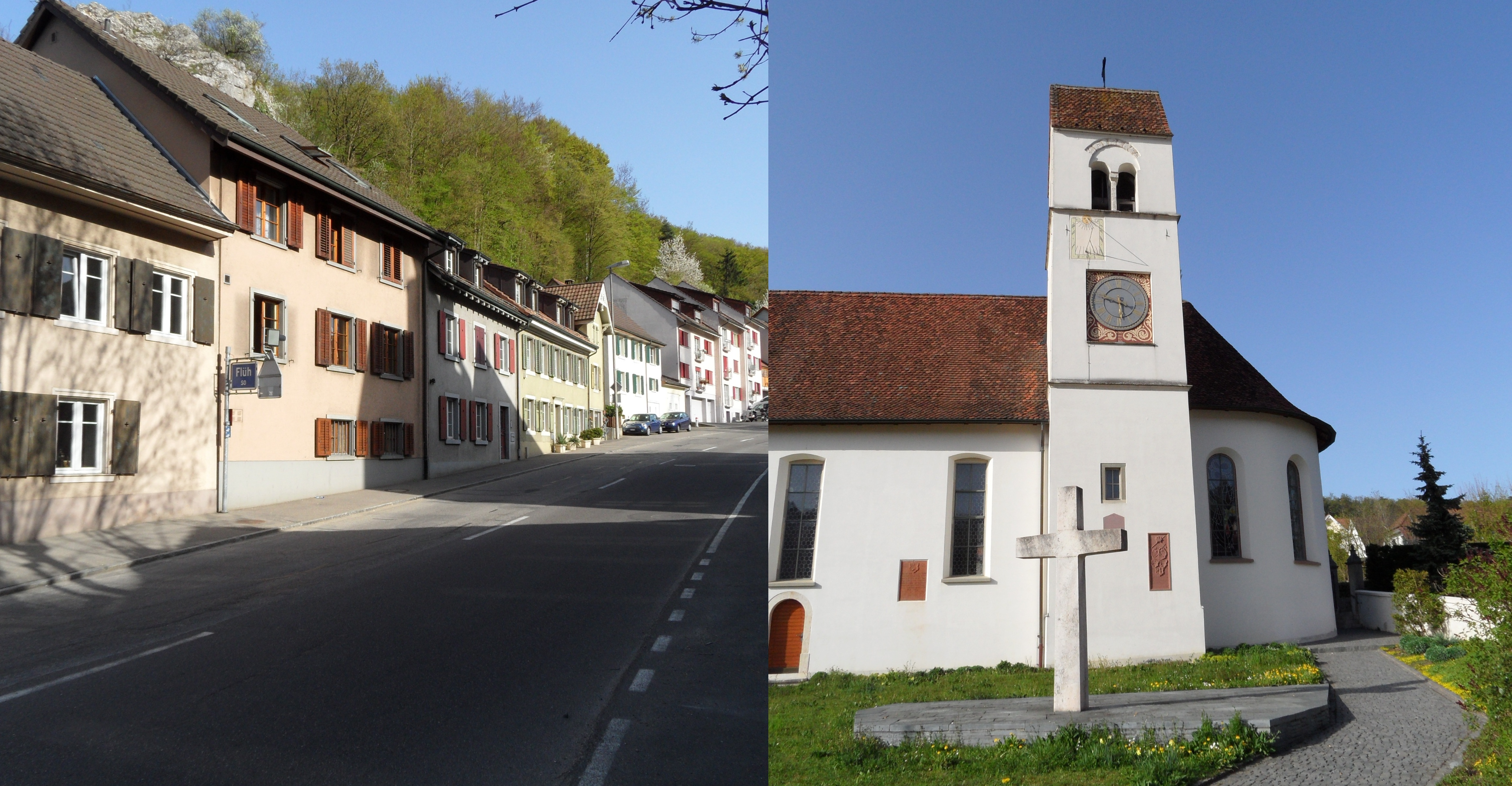
- Street in Flüh and church of Hofstetten

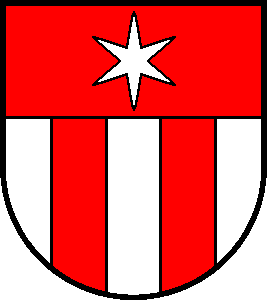
- Coat of arms
- Location of Hofstetten-Flüh
- Location within Switzerland Location within Canton of Solothurn
- Coordinates: 47°29′N 7°31′E
- Country: Switzerland
- Canton: Solothurn
- District: Dorneck

Government
  - Mayor: Tanja Steiger FDP/PRD (as of 2023)

Area
  - Total: 7.52 km^{2} (2.90 sq mi)
- Elevation: 462 m (1,516 ft)

Population (December 2020)
  - Total: 3,206
  - Density: 426/km^{2} (1,100/sq mi)
- Time zone: UTC+01:00 (CET)
  - Summer (DST): UTC+02:00 (CEST)
- Postal codes: 4114 (Hofstetten) & 4112 (Flüh)
- SFOS number: 2476
- ISO 3166 code: CH-SO
- Surrounded by: Bättwil, Blauen (BL), Ettingen (BL), Leymen (FR-68), Metzerlen-Mariastein, Witterswil
- Website: www.hofstettenflueh.ch

Hofstetten-Flüh (Swiss German: Hufstette-Flüe) is a municipality in the district of Dorneck in the canton of Solothurn in Switzerland.

== History ==
Hofstetten-Flüh is first mentioned in 1194 as Huhostetten.

== Geography ==
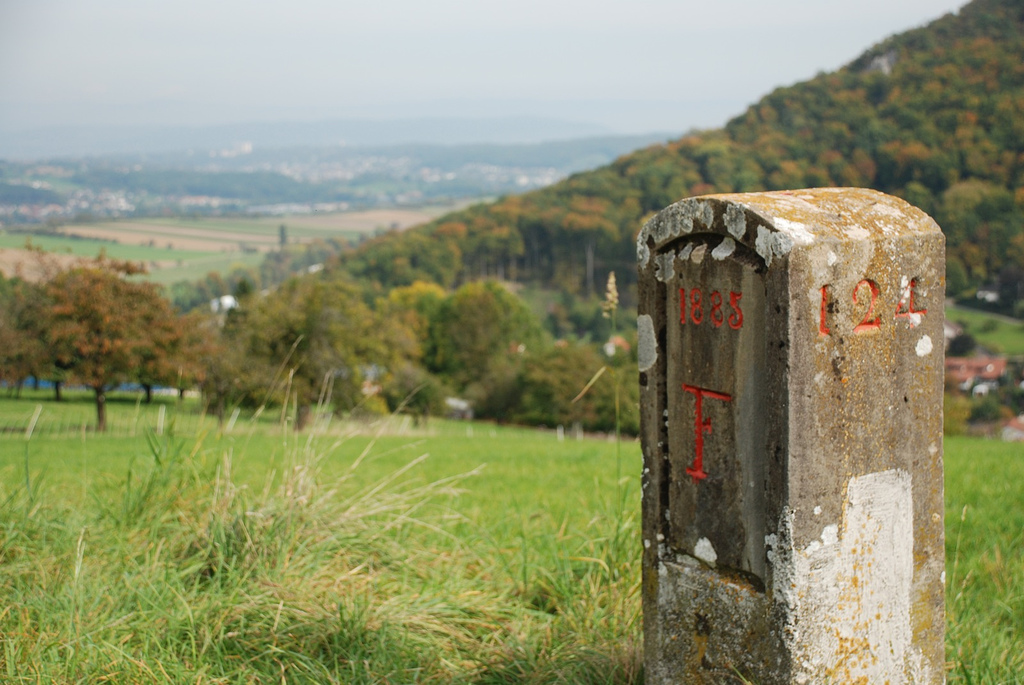
Swiss-French border near Flüh

Aerial view (1950)

Hofstetten-Flüh has an area, as of 2009, of 7.52 square kilometers (2.90 sq mi). Of this area, 3.04 km^{2} (1.17 sq mi) or 40.4% is used for agricultural purposes, while 3.36 km^{2} (1.30 sq mi) or 44.7% is forested. Of the rest of the land, 1.11 km^{2} (0.43 sq mi) or 14.8% is settled (buildings or roads), 0.01 km^{2} (2.5 acres) or 0.1% is either rivers or lakes.

Of the built up area, industrial buildings made up 1.1% of the total area while housing and buildings made up 10.4% and transportation infrastructure made up 2.8%. Out of the forested land, all of the forested land area is covered with heavy forests. Of the agricultural land, 14.1% is used for growing crops and 18.9% is pastures, while 7.4% is used for orchards or vine crops. All the water in the municipality is flowing water.

The municipality is located in the Dorneck district, in the hills south of the Leimen valley. It is part of an exclave of the Canton of Solothurn. It consists of the village of Hofstetten-Flüh and is made up of the villages of Hofstetten and Flüh.

== Coat of arms ==
The blazon of the municipal coat of arms is Argent two Pales Gules and in a Chief of the same a Mullet of the first.

== Demographics ==
Hofstetten-Flüh has a population (as of December 2020) of 3,206. As of 2008, 13.2% of the population are resident foreign nationals. Over the last 10 years (1999–2009 ) the population has changed at a rate of 10.7%.

Most of the population (as of 2000) speaks German (2,501 or 92.1%), with English being second most common (57 or 2.1%) and French being third (38 or 1.4%).

As of 2008, the gender distribution of the population was 49.7% male and 50.3% female. The population was made up of 1,272 Swiss men (41.9% of the population) and 235 (7.7%) non-Swiss men. There were 1,335 Swiss women (44.0%) and 193 (6.4%) non-Swiss women. Of the population in the municipality 666 or about 24.5% were born in Hofstetten-Flüh and lived there in 2000. There were 159 or 5.9% who were born in the same canton, while 1,358 or 50.0% were born somewhere else in Switzerland, and 468 or 17.2% were born outside of Switzerland.

In 2008 there were 22 live births to Swiss citizens and 3 births to non-Swiss citizens, and in same time span there were 12 deaths of Swiss citizens and 1 non-Swiss citizen death. Ignoring immigration and emigration, the population of Swiss citizens increased by 10 while the foreign population increased by 2. There were 5 Swiss men and 4 Swiss women who emigrated from Switzerland. At the same time, there were 4 non-Swiss women who emigrated from Switzerland to another country. The total Swiss population change in 2008 (from all sources, including moves across municipal borders) was an increase of 6 and the non-Swiss population increased by 8 people. This represents a population growth rate of 0.5%.

The age distribution, as of 2000, in Hofstetten-Flüh is; 212 children or 7.8% of the population are between 0 and 6 years old and 480 teenagers or 17.7% are between 7 and 19. Of the adult population, 117 people or 4.3% of the population are between 20 and 24 years old. 817 people or 30.1% are between 25 and 44, and 798 people or 29.4% are between 45 and 64. The senior population distribution is 245 people or 9.0% of the population are between 65 and 79 years old and there are 48 people or 1.8% who are over 80.

As of 2000, there were 1,039 people who were single and never married in the municipality. There were 1,444 married individuals, 104 widows or widowers and 130 individuals who are divorced.

As of 2000, there were 1,082 private households in the municipality, and an average of 2.5 persons per household. There were 242 households that consist of only one person and 75 households with five or more people. Out of a total of 1,092 households that answered this question, 22.2% were households made up of just one person and there were 7 adults who lived with their parents. Of the rest of the households, there are 374 married couples without children, 386 married couples with children There were 60 single parents with a child or children. There were 13 households that were made up of unrelated people and 10 households that were made up of some sort of institution or another collective housing.

In 2000 there were 696 single family homes (or 81.0% of the total) out of a total of 859 inhabited buildings. There were 81 multi-family buildings (9.4%), along with 61 multi-purpose buildings that were mostly used for housing (7.1%) and 21 other use buildings (commercial or industrial) that also had some housing (2.4%). Of the single family homes 55 were built before 1919, while 131 were built between 1990 and 2000. The greatest number of single family homes (211) were built between 1981 and 1990.

In 2000 there were 1,141 apartments in the municipality. The most common apartment size was 5 rooms of which there were 328. There were 10 single room apartments and 574 apartments with five or more rooms. Of these apartments, a total of 1,060 apartments (92.9% of the total) were permanently occupied, while 53 apartments (4.6%) were seasonally occupied and 28 apartments (2.5%) were empty. As of 2009, the construction rate of new housing units was 5.3 new units per 1000 residents. The vacancy rate for the municipality, in 2010, was 2.3%.

The historical population is given in the following chart:

== Politics ==
In the 2011 federal election, the most popular party was the SVP which received 22.6% of the vote. The next four most popular parties were the CVP (19.0%), the FDP (16.8%), the SP (16.3%) and the Green Party (9.6%). In the federal election, a total of 1,109 votes were cast, and the voter turnout was 51.6%.

== Economy ==
As of 2010, Hofstetten-Flüh had an unemployment rate of 2.3%. As of 2008, there were 40 people employed in the primary economic sector and about 14 businesses involved in this sector. 250 people were employed in the secondary sector and there were 36 businesses in this sector. 262 people were employed in the tertiary sector, with 66 businesses in this sector. There were 1,424 residents of the municipality who were employed in some capacity, of which females made up 41.7% of the workforce.

In 2008 the total number of full-time equivalent jobs was 435. The number of jobs in the primary sector was 25, of which 20 were in agriculture and 5 were in forestry or lumber production. The number of jobs in the secondary sector was 228 of which 134 or (58.8%) were in manufacturing and 94 (41.2%) were in construction. The number of jobs in the tertiary sector was 182. In the tertiary sector; 29 or 15.9% were in wholesale or retail sales or the repair of motor vehicles, 5 or 2.7% were in the movement and storage of goods, 34 or 18.7% were in a hotel or restaurant, 5 or 2.7% were in the information industry, 8 or 4.4% were the insurance or financial industry, 26 or 14.3% were technical professionals or scientists, 15 or 8.2% were in education and 30 or 16.5% were in health care.

In 2000, there were 523 workers who commuted into the municipality and 1,145 workers who commuted away. The municipality is a net exporter of workers, with about 2.2 workers leaving the municipality for every one entering. About 31.9% of the workforce coming into Hofstetten-Flüh are coming from outside Switzerland. Of the working population, 21.7% used public transportation to get to work, and 61.1% used a private car.

== Religion ==
From the 2000 census, 1,139 or 41.9% were Roman Catholic, while 752 or 27.7% belonged to the Swiss Reformed Church. Of the rest of the population, there were 18 members of an Orthodox church (or about 0.66% of the population), there were 2 individuals (or about 0.07% of the population) who belonged to the Christian Catholic Church, and there were 60 individuals (or about 2.21% of the population) who belonged to another Christian church. There were 2 individuals (or about 0.07% of the population) who were Jewish, and 47 (or about 1.73% of the population) who were Islamic. There were 7 individuals who were Buddhist, 21 individuals who were Hindu and 1 individual who belonged to another church. 598 (or about 22.01% of the population) belonged to no church, are agnostic or atheist, and 70 individuals (or about 2.58% of the population) did not answer the question.

== Education ==
In Hofstetten-Flüh about 1,103 or (40.6%) of the population have completed non-mandatory upper secondary education, and 501 or (18.4%) have completed additional higher education (either university or a Fachhochschule). Of the 501 who completed tertiary schooling, 60.3% were Swiss men, 24.2% were Swiss women, 9.6% were non-Swiss men and 6.0% were non-Swiss women.

During the 2010–2011 school year there were a total of 224 students in the Hofstetten-Flüh school system. The education system in the Canton of Solothurn allows young children to attend two years of non-obligatory Kindergarten. During that school year, there were 56 children in kindergarten. The canton's school system requires students to attend six years of primary school, with some of the children attending smaller, specialized classes. In the municipality there were 168 students in primary school. The secondary school program consists of three lower, obligatory years of schooling, followed by three to five years of optional, advanced schools. All the lower secondary students from Hofstetten-Flüh attend their school in a neighboring municipality.

As of 2000, there were 5 students in Hofstetten-Flüh who came from another municipality, while 270 residents attended schools outside the municipality.
