= Gempen =

- Municipality
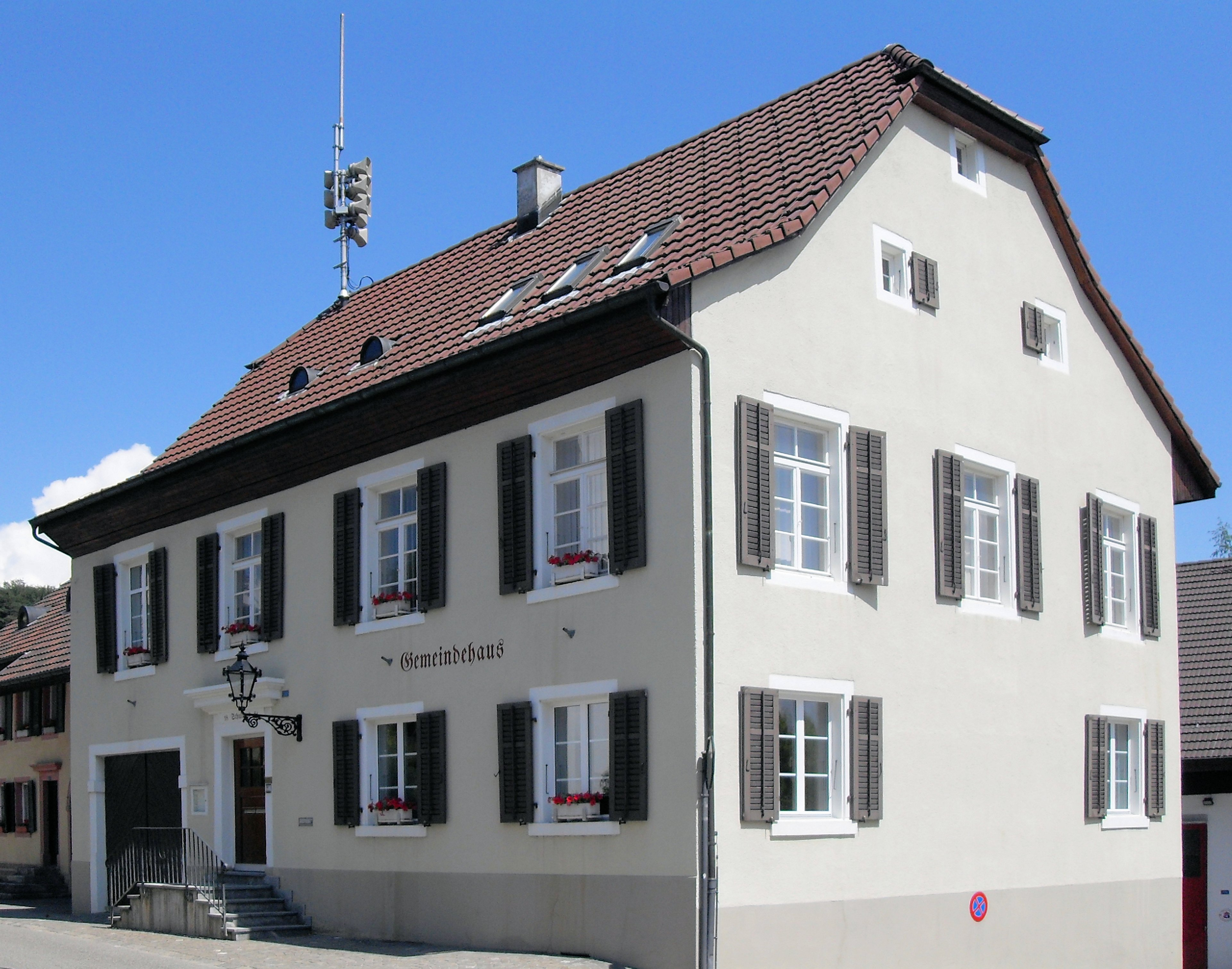

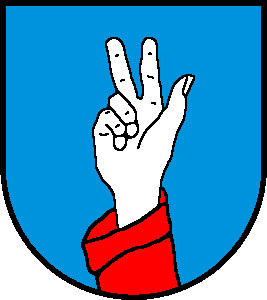
- Coat of arms
- Location of Gempen
- Location within Switzerland Location within Canton of Solothurn
- Coordinates: 47°29′N 7°40′E
- Country: Switzerland
- Canton: Solothurn
- District: Dorneck

Area
  - Total: 6.00 km^{2} (2.32 sq mi)
- Elevation: 676 m (2,218 ft)

Population (December 2020)
  - Total: 904
  - Density: 151/km^{2} (390/sq mi)
- Time zone: UTC+01:00 (CET)
  - Summer (DST): UTC+02:00 (CEST)
- Postal code: 4145
- SFOS number: 2474
- ISO 3166 code: CH-SO
- Surrounded by: Arlesheim (BL), Büren, Dornach, Frenkendorf (BL), Hochwald, Muttenz (BL), Nuglar-Sankt Pantaleon, Pratteln (BL)
- Website: www.gempen.ch

Gempen (Swiss German: Gämpe) is a municipality in the district of Dorneck in the canton of Solothurn in Switzerland.

== History ==
Gempen is first mentioned in 1277 as Gempenon.

== Geography ==
Aerial view from 200 m by Walter Mittelholzer (1924)

Gempen has an area, as of 2009, of 6 square kilometers (2.3 sq mi). Of this area, 3.14 km^{2} (1.21 sq mi) or 52.3% is used for agricultural purposes, while 2.45 km^{2} (0.95 sq mi) or 40.8% is forested. Of the rest of the land, 0.38 km^{2} (0.15 sq mi) or 6.3% is settled (buildings or roads).

Of the built up area, housing and buildings made up 3.7% and transportation infrastructure made up 2.5%. Out of the forested land, 38.0% of the total land area is heavily forested and 2.8% is covered with orchards or small clusters of trees. Of the agricultural land, 25.5% is used for growing crops and 19.2% is pastures, while 7.7% is used for orchards or vine crops.

The municipality is located in the Dorneck district, on the eastern edge of the Schartenfluh and Gempenfluh. It consists of the village of Gempen and the hamlets of Gempenstollen, Schönmatt and Baumgarten.

== Coat of arms ==
The blazon of the municipal coat of arms is Azure a Hand with three fingers raised Argent sleeved Gules issuant from base.

== Demographics ==
Gempen has a population (as of December 2020) of 904. As of 2008, 15.9% of the population are resident foreign nationals. Over the last 10 years (1999–2009 ) the population has changed at a rate of 16.1%.

Most of the population (as of 2000) speaks German (702 or 94.0%), with Serbo-Croatian being second most common (12 or 1.6%) and French being third (10 or 1.3%).

As of 2008, the gender distribution of the population was 48.4% male and 51.6% female. The population was made up of 318 Swiss men (40.2% of the population) and 65 (8.2%) non-Swiss men. There were 338 Swiss women (42.7%) and 71 (9.0%) non-Swiss women. Of the population in the municipality 188 or about 25.2% were born in Gempen and lived there in 2000. There were 78 or 10.4% who were born in the same canton, while 329 or 44.0% were born somewhere else in Switzerland, and 136 or 18.2% were born outside of Switzerland.

In 2008 there were 5 live births to Swiss citizens and 1 birth to non-Swiss citizens, and in same time span there were 8 deaths of Swiss citizens. Ignoring immigration and emigration, the population of Swiss citizens decreased by 3 while the foreign population increased by 1. There were 4 Swiss men and 1 Swiss woman who immigrated back to Switzerland. At the same time, there were 6 non-Swiss men and 2 non-Swiss women who immigrated from another country to Switzerland. The total Swiss population change in 2008 (from all sources, including moves across municipal borders) was an increase of 14 and the non-Swiss population increased by 14 people. This represents a population growth rate of 3.8%.

The age distribution, as of 2000, in Gempen is; 62 children or 8.3% of the population are between 0 and 6 years old and 136 teenagers or 18.2% are between 7 and 19. Of the adult population, 55 people or 7.4% of the population are between 20 and 24 years old. 223 people or 29.9% are between 25 and 44, and 184 people or 24.6% are between 45 and 64. The senior population distribution is 64 people or 8.6% of the population are between 65 and 79 years old and there are 23 people or 3.1% who are over 80.

As of 2000, there were 360 people who were single and never married in the municipality. There were 348 married individuals, 22 widows or widowers and 17 individuals who are divorced.

As of 2000, there were 261 private households in the municipality, and an average of 2.6 persons per household. There were 65 households that consist of only one person and 30 households with five or more people. Out of a total of 272 households that answered this question, 23.9% were households made up of just one person and there were 1 adults who lived with their parents. Of the rest of the households, there are 83 married couples without children, 90 married couples with children There were 18 single parents with a child or children. There were 4 households that were made up of unrelated people and 11 households that were made up of some sort of institution or another collective housing.

In 2000 there were 160 single family homes (or 68.7% of the total) out of a total of 233 inhabited buildings. There were 26 multi-family buildings (11.2%), along with 31 multi-purpose buildings that were mostly used for housing (13.3%) and 16 other use buildings (commercial or industrial) that also had some housing (6.9%). Of the single family homes 17 were built before 1919, while 43 were built between 1990 and 2000. The greatest number of single family homes (39) were built between 1971 and 1980.

In 2000 there were 292 apartments in the municipality. The most common apartment size was 5 rooms of which there were 77. There were 8 single room apartments and 146 apartments with five or more rooms. Of these apartments, a total of 256 apartments (87.7% of the total) were permanently occupied, while 23 apartments (7.9%) were seasonally occupied and 13 apartments (4.5%) were empty. As of 2009, the construction rate of new housing units was 3.9 new units per 1000 residents. The vacancy rate for the municipality, in 2010, was 1.17%.

The historical population is given in the following chart:

== Politics ==
In the 2007 federal election the most popular party was the SVP which received 29.48% of the vote. The next three most popular parties were the FDP (22.79%), the SP (22.58%) and the Green Party (16.72%). In the federal election, a total of 283 votes were cast, and the voter turnout was 55.3%.

== Economy ==
As of 2010, Gempen had an unemployment rate of 0.9%. As of 2008, there were 47 people employed in the primary economic sector and about 13 businesses involved in this sector. 31 people were employed in the secondary sector and there were 6 businesses in this sector. 256 people were employed in the tertiary sector, with 20 businesses in this sector. There were 392 residents of the municipality who were employed in some capacity, of which females made up 40.8% of the workforce.

In 2008 the total number of full-time equivalent jobs was 261. The number of jobs in the primary sector was 29, of which 28 were in agriculture and 1 was in forestry or lumber production. The number of jobs in the secondary sector was 30 of which 7 or (23.3%) were in manufacturing and 23 (76.7%) were in construction. The number of jobs in the tertiary sector was 202. In the tertiary sector; 12 or 5.9% were in wholesale or retail sales or the repair of motor vehicles, 11 or 5.4% were in a hotel or restaurant, 9 or 4.5% were technical professionals or scientists, 2 or 1.0% were in education and 152 or 75.2% were in health care.

In 2000, there were 244 workers who commuted into the municipality and 246 workers who commuted away. The municipality is a net exporter of workers, with about 1.0 workers leaving the municipality for every one entering. About 3.3% of the workforce coming into Gempen are coming from outside Switzerland. Of the working population, 13.5% used public transportation to get to work, and 50.3% used a private car.

== Religion ==
From the 2000 census, 278 or 37.2% were Roman Catholic, while 233 or 31.2% belonged to the Swiss Reformed Church. Of the rest of the population, there were 3 members of an Orthodox church (or about 0.40% of the population), there was 1 individual who belongs to the Christian Catholic Church, and there were 23 individuals (or about 3.08% of the population) who belonged to another Christian church. There was 1 individual who was Jewish, and 19 (or about 2.54% of the population) who were Islamic. There were 2 individuals who were Buddhist and 1 individual who belonged to another church. 167 (or about 22.36% of the population) belonged to no church, are agnostic or atheist, and 19 individuals (or about 2.54% of the population) did not answer the question.

== Education ==
In Gempen about 283 or (37.9%) of the population have completed non-mandatory upper secondary education, and 127 or (17.0%) have completed additional higher education (either university or a Fachhochschule). Of the 127 who completed tertiary schooling, 48.8% were Swiss men, 25.2% were Swiss women, 15.7% were non-Swiss men and 10.2% were non-Swiss women.

During the 2010-2011 school year there were a total of 47 students in the Gempen school system. The education system in the Canton of Solothurn allows young children to attend two years of non-obligatory Kindergarten. During that school year, there were children in kindergarten. The canton's school system requires students to attend six years of primary school, with some of the children attending smaller, specialized classes. In the municipality there were 47 students in primary school. The secondary school program consists of three lower, obligatory years of schooling, followed by three to five years of optional, advanced schools. All the lower secondary students from Gempen attend their school in a neighboring municipality.

As of 2000, there were 32 students in Gempen who came from another municipality, while 53 residents attended schools outside the municipality.

== Sights ==
Nearby Gempen is the Gempentower, from which there can be observed the wider countryside around Basel, Dornach and Aesch.
