= Metzerlen-Mariastein =

- Municipality
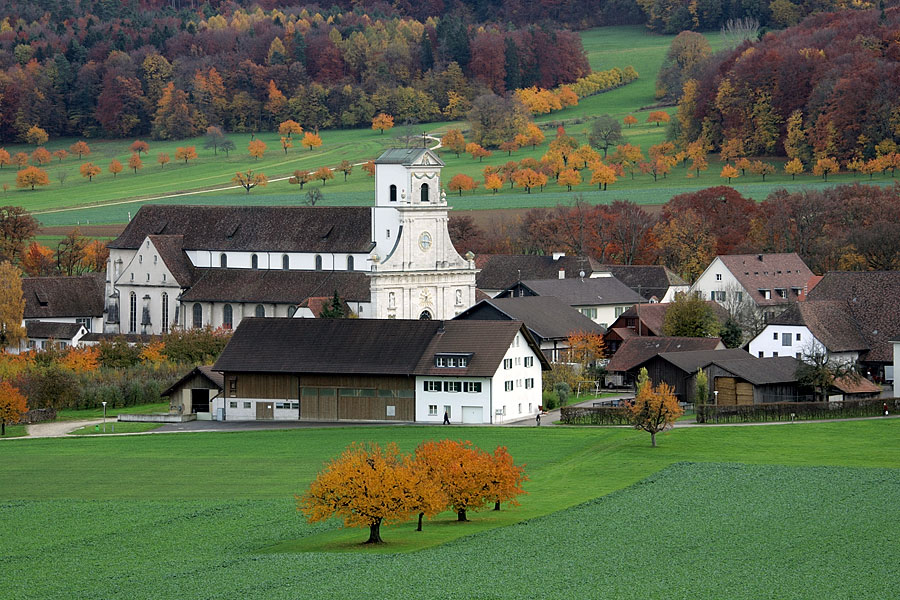
- Mariastein Abbey

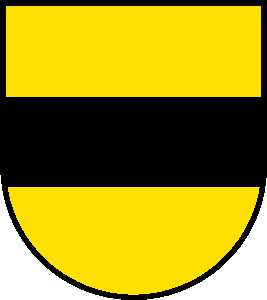
- Coat of arms
- Location of Metzerlen-Mariastein
- Location within Switzerland Location within Canton of Solothurn
- Coordinates: 47°28′N 7°28′E
- Country: Switzerland
- Canton: Solothurn
- District: Dorneck

Area
  - Total: 8.49 km^{2} (3.28 sq mi)
- Elevation: 526 m (1,726 ft)
- Highest elevation (Ränzeboden/Challplatten): 875 m (2,871 ft)
- Lowest elevation (Ried/Geissberg): 474 m (1,555 ft)

Population (December 2020)
  - Total: 938
  - Density: 110/km^{2} (286/sq mi)
- Time zone: UTC+01:00 (CET)
  - Summer (DST): UTC+02:00 (CEST)
- Postal code: 4116
- SFOS number: 2477
- ISO 3166 code: CH-SO
- Surrounded by: Biederthal (FR-68), Blauen (BL), Burg im Leimental (BL), Dittingen (BL), Hofstetten-Flüh, Leymen (FR-68), Rodersdorf, Röschenz (BL)
- Website: www.metzerlen.ch

Metzerlen-Mariastein is a municipality in the district of Dorneck in the canton of Solothurn in Switzerland. The present name of the municipality dates from 2003, it being previously known as Metzerlen.

The nearby Benedictine Mariastein Abbey is an important place of pilgrimage.

== History ==
Metzerlen is first mentioned in 1194 as Mezherlon. Until 2002 the official name was Metzerlen.

== Geography ==
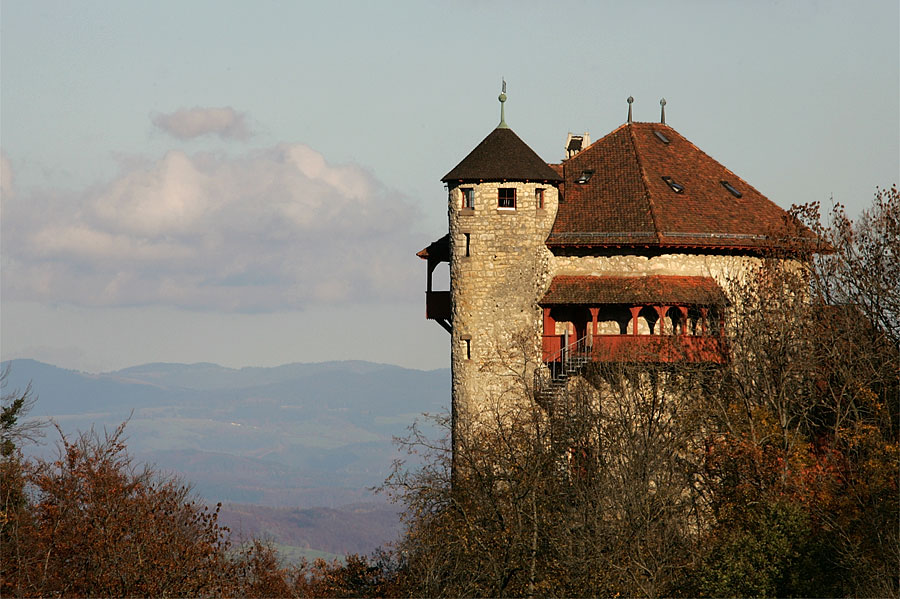
Rotberg Castle

Aerial view (1950)

Metzerlen-Mariastein has an area, as of 2009, of 8.49 square kilometers (3.28 sq mi). Of this area, 3.99 km^{2} (1.54 sq mi) or 47.0% is used for agricultural purposes, while 3.89 km^{2} (1.50 sq mi) or 45.8% is forested. Of the rest of the land, 0.65 km^{2} (0.25 sq mi) or 7.7% is settled (buildings or roads), 0.01 km^{2} (2.5 acres) or 0.1% is either rivers or lakes.

Of the built up area, housing and buildings made up 4.9% and transportation infrastructure made up 2.4%. Out of the forested land, all of the forested land area is covered with heavy forests. Of the agricultural land, 27.3% is used for growing crops and 14.7% is pastures, while 4.9% is used for orchards or vine crops. All the water in the municipality is flowing water.

The municipality is located in the Dorneck district, at the north foot of the Blauen mountain in the upper Birsig and Leimen valleys. It consists of the S-shaped linear village of Metzerlen and the hamlets of Mariastein around the monastery.

== Coat of arms ==
The blazon of the municipal coat of arms is Or a Fess Sable.

== Demographics ==
Metzerlen-Mariastein has a population (as of December 2020) of 938. As of 2008, 7.2% of the population are resident foreign nationals. Over the last 10 years (1999–2009 ) the population has changed at a rate of 11%.

Most of the population (as of 2000) speaks German (789 or 96.6%), with English being second most common (6 or 0.7%) and French being third (5 or 0.6%).

Of the population in the municipality 319 or about 39.0% were born in Metzerlen-Mariastein and lived there in 2000. There were 79 or 9.7% who were born in the same canton, while 309 or 37.8% were born somewhere else in Switzerland, and 89 or 10.9% were born outside of Switzerland.

In 2008 there were 8 live births to Swiss citizens and were 8 deaths of Swiss citizens. Ignoring immigration and emigration, the population of Swiss citizens remained the same while the foreign population remained the same. There were 3 Swiss women who emigrated from Switzerland. At the same time, there were 4 non-Swiss men and 1 non-Swiss woman who immigrated from another country to Switzerland. The total Swiss population change in 2008 (from all sources, including moves across municipal borders) was an increase of 21 and the non-Swiss population increased by 5 people. This represents a population growth rate of 2.9%.

As of 2000, there were 340 people who were single and never married in the municipality. There were 409 married individuals, 31 widows or widowers and 37 individuals who are divorced.

As of 2000, there were 317 private households in the municipality, and an average of 2.4 persons per household. There were 81 households that consist of only one person and 25 households with five or more people. Out of a total of 328 households that answered this question, 24.7% were households made up of just one person and there were 1 adults who lived with their parents. Of the rest of the households, there are 113 married couples without children, 100 married couples with children There were 19 single parents with a child or children. There were 3 households that were made up of unrelated people and 11 households that were made up of some sort of institution or another collective housing.

In 2000 there were 194 single family homes (or 71.9% of the total) out of a total of 270 inhabited buildings. There were 27 multi-family buildings (10.0%), along with 32 multi-purpose buildings that were mostly used for housing (11.9%) and 17 other use buildings (commercial or industrial) that also had some housing (6.3%). Of the single family homes 33 were built before 1919, while 45 were built between 1990 and 2000. The greatest number of single family homes (42) were built between 1971 and 1980.

In 2000 there were 325 apartments in the municipality. The most common apartment size was 4 rooms of which there were 98. There were 8 single room apartments and 155 apartments with five or more rooms. Of these apartments, a total of 303 apartments (93.2% of the total) were permanently occupied, while 13 apartments (4.0%) were seasonally occupied and 9 apartments (2.8%) were empty. As of 2009, the construction rate of new housing units was 0 new units per 1000 residents. The vacancy rate for the municipality, in 2010, was 0.26%.

The historical population is given in the following chart:

== Heritage sites of national significance ==
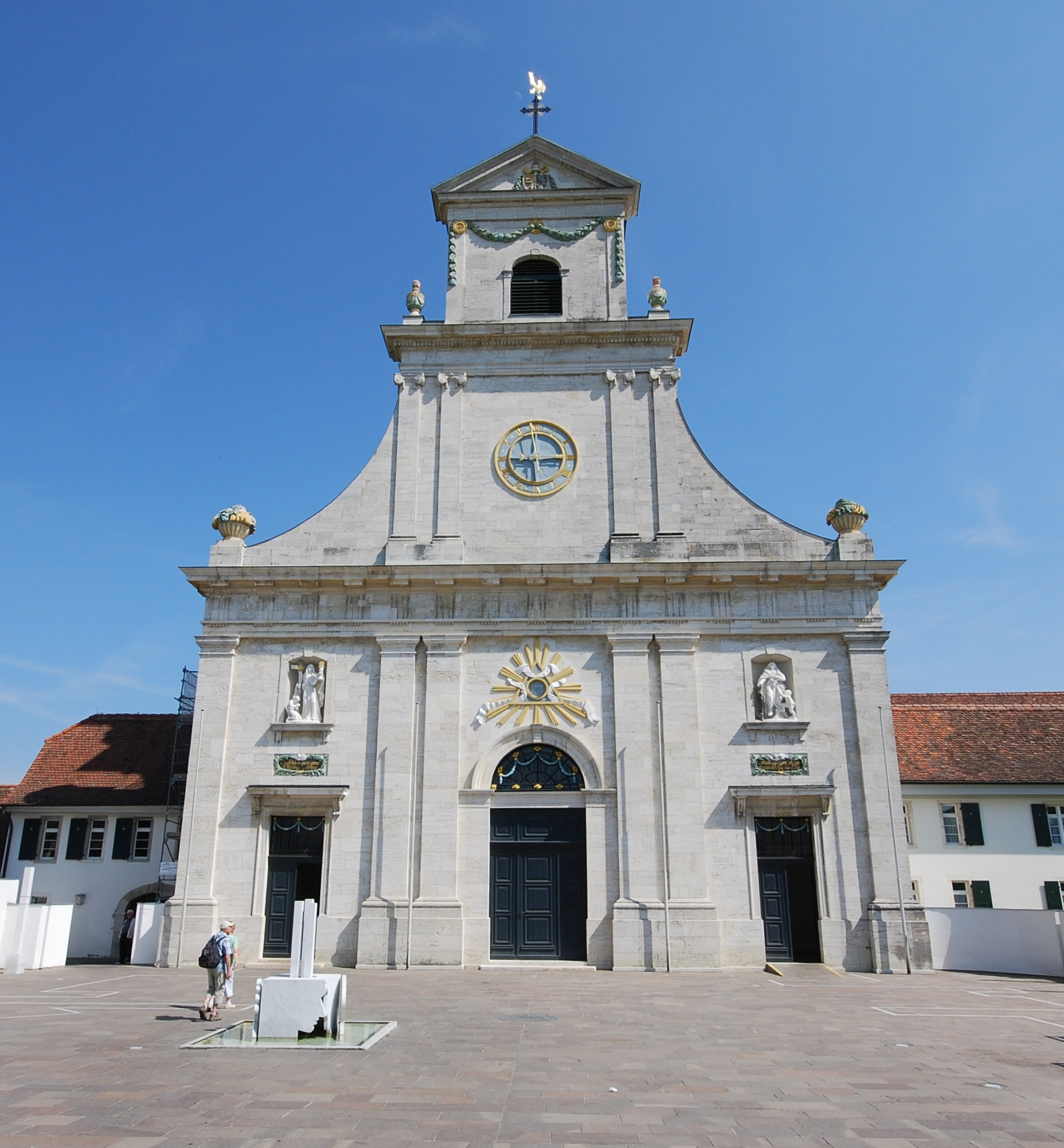
Mariastein Abbey

The Benedictine Mariastein Abbey with its library is listed as a Swiss heritage site of national significance. The entire village of Metzerlen and the Mariastein Abbey site are part of the Inventory of Swiss Heritage Sites.

== Politics ==
In the 2007 federal election the most popular party was the CVP which received 28.12% of the vote. The next three most popular parties were the SVP (26.68%), the FDP (17.35%) and the SP (17.18%). In the federal election, a total of 344 votes were cast, and the voter turnout was 49.7%.

== Economy ==
As of 2010, Metzerlen-Mariastein had an unemployment rate of 1.8%. As of 2008, there were 63 people employed in the primary economic sector and about 16 businesses involved in this sector. 21 people were employed in the secondary sector and there were 7 businesses in this sector. 176 people were employed in the tertiary sector, with 31 businesses in this sector. There were 448 residents of the municipality who were employed in some capacity, of which females made up 42.9% of the workforce.

In 2008 the total number of full-time equivalent jobs was 203. The number of jobs in the primary sector was 42, all of which were in agriculture. The number of jobs in the secondary sector was 18 of which 4 or (22.2%) were in manufacturing and 14 (77.8%) were in construction. The number of jobs in the tertiary sector was 143. In the tertiary sector; 32 or 22.4% were in wholesale or retail sales or the repair of motor vehicles, 4 or 2.8% were in the movement and storage of goods, 45 or 31.5% were in a hotel or restaurant, 4 or 2.8% were in the information industry, 7 or 4.9% were technical professionals or scientists, 4 or 2.8% were in education and 3 or 2.1% were in health care.

In 2000, there were 111 workers who commuted into the municipality and 314 workers who commuted away. The municipality is a net exporter of workers, with about 2.8 workers leaving the municipality for every one entering. About 19.8% of the workforce coming into Metzerlen-Mariastein are coming from outside Switzerland. Of the working population, 19.4% used public transportation to get to work, and 54.5% used a private car.

== Religion ==
From the 2000 census, 541 or 66.2% were Roman Catholic, while 103 or 12.6% belonged to the Swiss Reformed Church. Of the rest of the population, there were 5 members of an Orthodox church (or about 0.61% of the population), and there were 7 individuals (or about 0.86% of the population) who belonged to another Christian church. There were 2 (or about 0.24% of the population) who were Islamic. There FALSE4 individuals who were Hindu and 8 individuals who belonged to another church. 127 (or about 15.54% of the population) belonged to no church, are agnostic or atheist, and 20 individuals (or about 2.45% of the population) did not answer the question.

== Education ==
In Metzerlen-Mariastein about 342 or (41.9%) of the population have completed non-mandatory upper secondary education, and 122 or (14.9%) have completed additional higher education (either university or a Fachhochschule). Of the 122 who completed tertiary schooling, 64.8% were Swiss men, 31.1% were Swiss women, 4.1% were non-Swiss men.

During the 2010-2011 school year there were a total of 78 students in the Metzerlen-Mariastein school system. The education system in the Canton of Solothurn allows young children to attend two years of non-obligatory Kindergarten. During that school year, there were 23 children in kindergarten. The canton's school system requires students to attend six years of primary school, with some of the children attending smaller, specialized classes. In the municipality there were 55 students in primary school. The secondary school program consists of three lower, obligatory years of schooling, followed by three to five years of optional, advanced schools. All the lower secondary students from Metzerlen-Mariastein attend their school in a neighboring municipality.

As of 2000, there were 2 students in Metzerlen-Mariastein who came from another municipality, while 67 residents attended schools outside the municipality.
