= Ettingen =

- Municipality
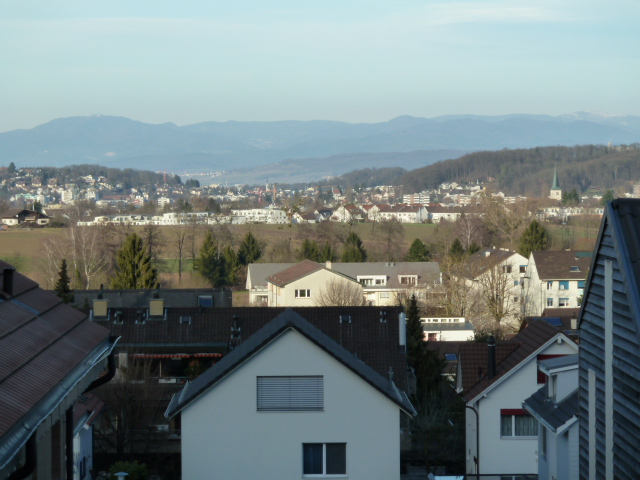

- Flag Coat of arms
- Location of Ettingen
- Location within Switzerland Location within Canton of Basel-Landschaft
- Coordinates: 47°29′N 7°33′E
- Country: Switzerland
- Canton: Basel-Landschaft
- District: Arlesheim

Area
  - Total: 6.35 km^{2} (2.45 sq mi)
- Elevation: 342 m (1,122 ft)

Population (June 2021)
  - Total: 5,538
  - Density: 872/km^{2} (2,260/sq mi)
- Time zone: UTC+01:00 (CET)
  - Summer (DST): UTC+02:00 (CEST)
- Postal code: 4107
- SFOS number: 2768
- ISO 3166 code: CH-BL
- Surrounded by: Aesch, Blauen, Hofstetten-Flüh (SO), Nenzlingen, Pfeffingen, Therwil, Witterswil (SO)
- Website: www.ettingen.ch

Ettingen (German pronunciation: [ˈɛtɪŋən]; Swiss German: Ettige) is a municipality in the district of Arlesheim in the canton of Basel-Country in Switzerland.

== History ==
Ettingen is first mentioned in 1268 as Ettingen.

== Geography ==
Aerial view (1950)

Ettingen has an area, as of 2009, of 6.35 square kilometers (2.45 sq mi). Of this area, 2.12 km^{2} (0.82 sq mi) or 33.4% is used for agricultural purposes, while 3.17 km^{2} (1.22 sq mi) or 49.9% is forested. Of the rest of the land, 1.09 km^{2} (0.42 sq mi) or 17.2% is settled (buildings or roads).

Of the built up area, housing and buildings made up 10.1% and transportation infrastructure made up 5.5%. Out of the forested land, all of the forested land area is covered with heavy forests. Of the agricultural land, 18.0% is used for growing crops and 7.9% is pastures, while 7.6% is used for orchards or vine crops.

The municipality is located in the Arlesheim district, in the southern Leimen valley. It consists of the haufendorf village (an irregular, unplanned and quite closely packed village, built around a central square) of Ettingen which has become a commuter town for the agglomeration of Basel.

== Coat of arms ==
The blazon of the municipal coat of arms is Quartered, Azure, Argent a Cross Gules, Argent and Azure.

== Demographics ==
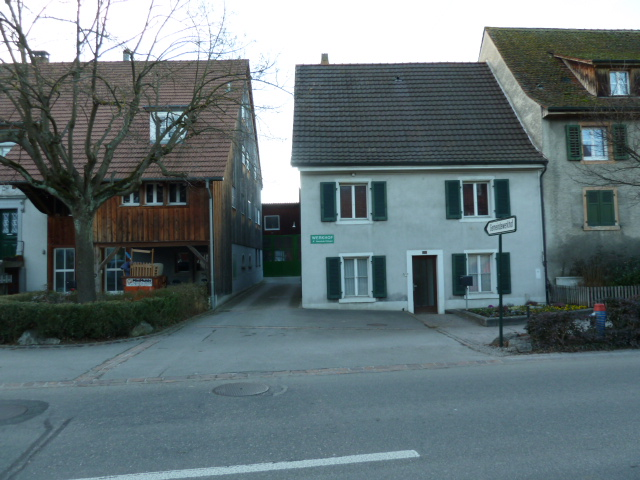
Buildings in Ettingen

Ettingen has a population (as of June 2021) of 5,538. As of 2008, 12.9% of the population are resident foreign nationals. Over the last 10 years (1997–2007) the population has changed at a rate of 1.8%.

Most of the population (as of 2000) speaks German (4,324 or 90.8%), with Italian language being second most common (111 or 2.3%) and English being third (84 or 1.8%). There are 60 people who speak French and 2 people who speak Romansh.

As of 2008, the gender distribution of the population was 49.3% male and 50.7% female. The population was made up of 4,185 Swiss citizens (86.0% of the population), and 683 non-Swiss residents (14.0%) Of the population in the municipality 1,229 or about 25.8% were born in Ettingen and lived there in 2000. There were 885 or 18.6% who were born in the same canton, while 1,789 or 37.6% were born somewhere else in Switzerland, and 738 or 15.5% were born outside of Switzerland.

In 2008 there were 32 live births to Swiss citizens and 5 births to non-Swiss citizens, and in same time span there were 29 deaths of Swiss citizens and 1 non-Swiss citizen death. Ignoring immigration and emigration, the population of Swiss citizens increased by 3 while the foreign population increased by 4. There were 3 Swiss men and 2 Swiss women who emigrated from Switzerland. At the same time, there were 2 non-Swiss men and 12 non-Swiss women who immigrated from another country to Switzerland. The total Swiss population change in 2008 (from all sources, including moves across municipal borders) was a decrease of 33 and the non-Swiss population change was an increase of 17 people. This represents a population growth rate of -0.3%.

The age distribution, as of 2010, in Ettingen is; 276 children or 5.7% of the population are between 0 and 6 years old and 686 teenagers or 14.1% are between 7 and 19. Of the adult population, 573 people or 11.8% of the population are between 20 and 29 years old. 593 people or 12.2% are between 30 and 39, 836 people or 17.2% are between 40 and 49, and 1,036 people or 21.3% are between 50 and 64. The senior population distribution is 708 people or 14.5% of the population are between 65 and 79 years old and there are 160 people or 3.3% who are over 80.

As of 2000, there were 1,933 people who were single and never married in the municipality. There were 2,412 married individuals, 181 widows or widowers and 238 individuals who are divorced.

As of 2000, there were 1,996 private households in the municipality, and an average of 2.4 persons per household. There were 590 households that consist of only one person and 110 households with five or more people. Out of a total of 2,018 households that answered this question, 29.2% were households made up of just one person and 9 were adults who lived with their parents. Of the rest of the households, there are 598 married couples without children, 663 married couples with children There were 116 single parents with a child or children. There were 20 households that were made up unrelated people and 22 households that were made some sort of institution or another collective housing.

In 2000 there were 829 single family homes (or 73.7% of the total) out of a total of 1,125 inhabited buildings. There were 193 multi-family buildings (17.2%), along with 68 multi-purpose buildings that were mostly used for housing (6.0%) and 35 other use buildings (commercial or industrial) that also had some housing (3.1%). Of the single family homes 51 were built before 1919, while 105 were built between 1990 and 2000. The greatest number of single family homes (379) were built between 1971 and 1980.

In 2000 there were 2,040 apartments in the municipality. The most common apartment size was 4 rooms of which there were 682. There were 30 single room apartments and 682 apartments with five or more rooms. Of these apartments, a total of 1,950 apartments (95.6% of the total) were permanently occupied, while 61 apartments (3.0%) were seasonally occupied and 29 apartments (1.4%) were empty. As of 2007, the construction rate of new housing units was 7.1 new units per 1000 residents. As of 2000 the average price to rent a two-room apartment was about 954.00 CHF (US$760, £430, €610), a three-room apartment was about 1113.00 CHF (US$890, £500, €710) and a four-room apartment cost an average of 1377.00 CHF (US$1100, £620, €880). The vacancy rate for the municipality, in 2008, was 0.23%.

The historical population is given in the following chart:

== Politics ==
In the 2007 federal election the most popular party was the SVP which received 29.44% of the vote. The next three most popular parties were the SP (23.81%), the CVP (15.33%) and the FDP (14.92%). In the federal election, a total of 1,710 votes were cast, and the voter turnout was 48.7%.

== Economy ==
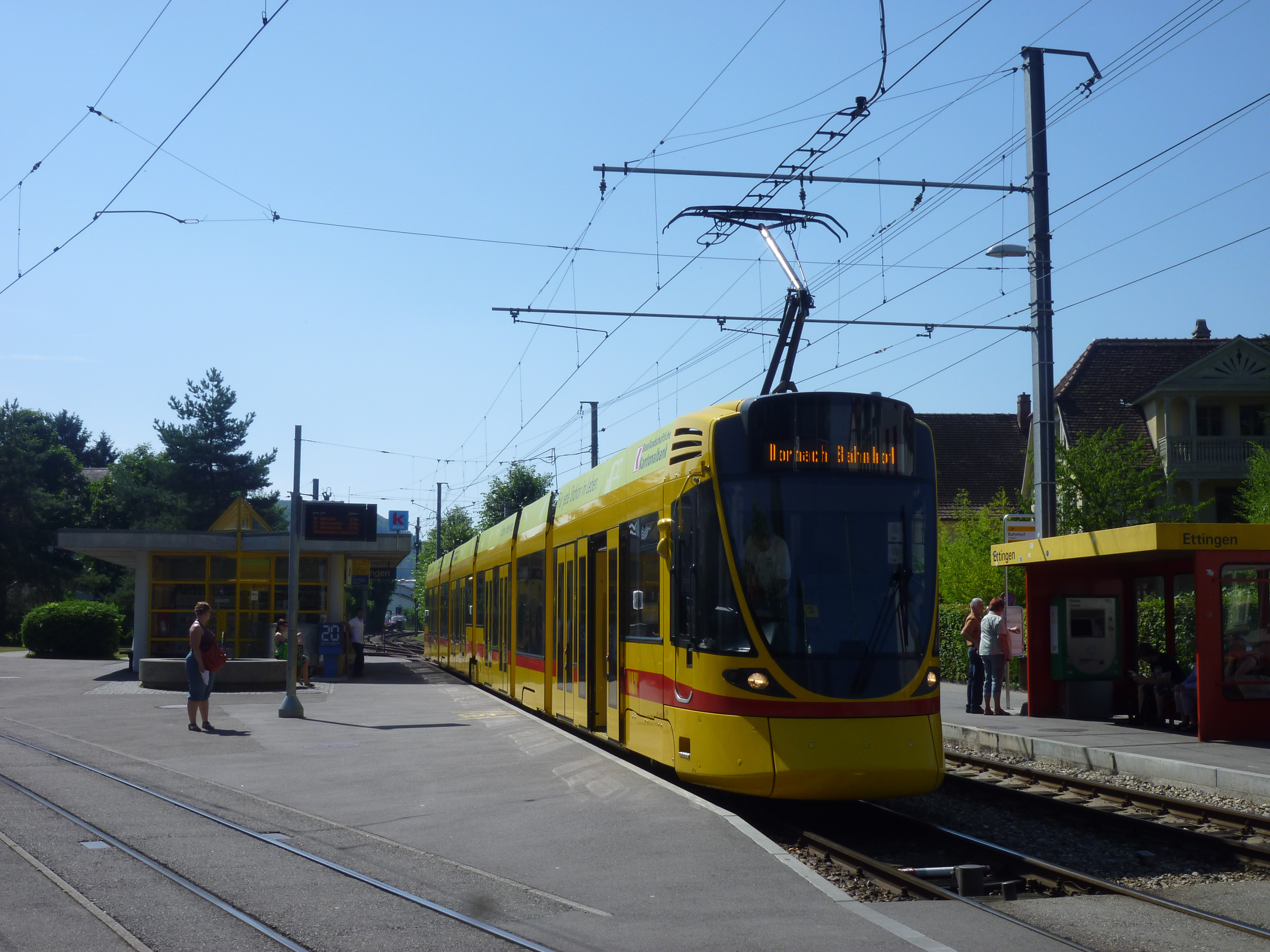
A tram stop in Ettingen, about 2,000 workers commute away from Ettingen every day

As of 2007, Ettingen had an unemployment rate of 1.94%. As of 2005, there were 60 people employed in the primary economic sector and about 18 businesses involved in this sector. 359 people were employed in the secondary sector and there were 31 businesses in this sector. 458 people were employed in the tertiary sector, with 100 businesses in this sector. There were 2,547 residents of the municipality who were employed in some capacity, of which females made up 44.8% of the workforce.

In 2008 the total number of full-time equivalent jobs was 814. The number of jobs in the primary sector was 30, of which 23 were in agriculture and 7 were in forestry or lumber production. The number of jobs in the secondary sector was 389, of which 259 or (66.6%) were in manufacturing and 131 (33.7%) were in construction. The number of jobs in the tertiary sector was 395. In the tertiary sector; 126 or 31.9% were in wholesale or retail sales or the repair of motor vehicles, 24 or 6.1% were in the movement and storage of goods, 24 or 6.1% were in a hotel or restaurant, 7 or 1.8% were in the information industry, 11 or 2.8% were the insurance or financial industry, 37 or 9.4% were technical professionals or scientists, 34 or 8.6% were in education and 63 or 15.9% were in health care.

In 2000, there were 666 workers who commuted into the municipality and 2,055 workers who commuted away. The municipality is a net exporter of workers, with about 3.1 workers leaving the municipality for every one entering. About 19.2% of the workforce coming into Ettingen are coming from outside Switzerland, while 0.3% of the locals commute out of Switzerland for work. Of the working population, 34.2% used public transportation to get to work, and 39.5% used a private car.

== Religion ==
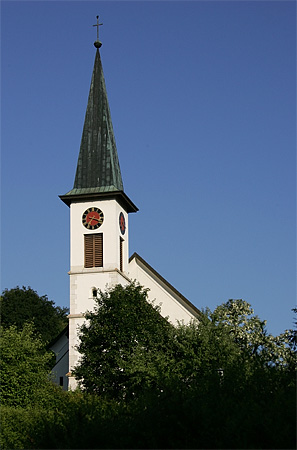
Ettingen church

From the 2000 census, 2,161 or 45.4% were Roman Catholic, while 1,517 or 31.8% belonged to the Swiss Reformed Church. Of the rest of the population, there were 26 members of an Orthodox church (or about 0.55% of the population), there were 8 individuals (or about 0.17% of the population) who belonged to the Christian Catholic Church, and there were 124 individuals (or about 2.60% of the population) who belonged to another Christian church. There was 1 individual who was Jewish, and 72 (or about 1.51% of the population) who were Islamic. There were 8 individuals who were Buddhist, 10 individuals who were Hindu and 4 individuals who belonged to another church. 693 (or about 14.55% of the population) belonged to no church, are agnostic or atheist, and 140 individuals (or about 2.94% of the population) did not answer the question.

== Education ==
In Ettingen about 2,090 or (43.9%) of the population have completed non-mandatory upper secondary education, and 746 or (15.7%) have completed additional higher education (either university or a Fachhochschule). Of the 746 who completed tertiary schooling, 61.4% were Swiss men, 24.1% were Swiss women, 9.9% were non-Swiss men and 4.6% were non-Swiss women. As of 2000, there were 10 students in Ettingen who came from another municipality, while 434 residents attended schools outside the municipality.
