= Rheinfelden Augarten railway station =

Railway station in Switzerland

Rheinfelden Augarten
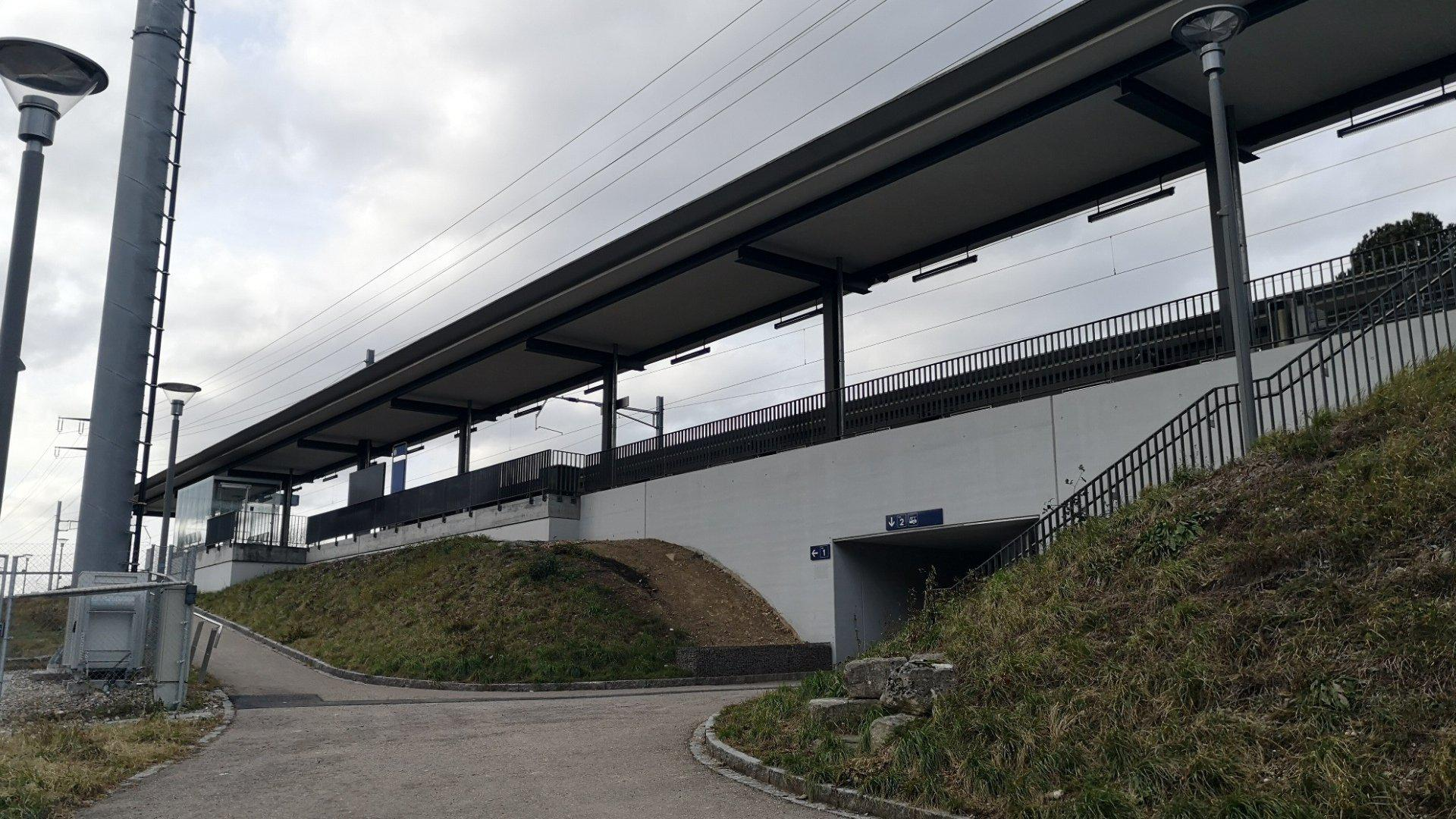
- The station platform and underpass in 2019

General information
- Location: Rheinfelden; Switzerland
- Coordinates: 47°32′44.30″N 7°46′5.27″E
- Owner: Swiss Federal Railways
- Line: Bözberg line
- Train operators: Swiss Federal Railways

History
- Opened: 14 December 2008

Services
Preceding station	Basel S-Bahn	Following station
Kaiseraugst towards Basel SBB	S1	Rheinfelden towards Laufenburg or Frick
Location
- Location within Switzerland

Rheinfelden Augarten railway station (German: Bahnhof Rheinfelden Augarten) is a railway station in the municipality of Rheinfelden, in the Swiss canton of Aargau. It is an intermediate stop on the Bözberg line and is served by local trains only.

== Services ==
As of the December 2025 timetable change, the following services stop at Rheinfelden Augarten:

- Basel S-Bahn: half-hourly service between Basel SBB and Stein-Säckingen and hourly service to Frick or Laufenburg.
