= Kaiseraugst railway station =

Railway station in Kaiseraugst, Switzerland

Kaiseraugst
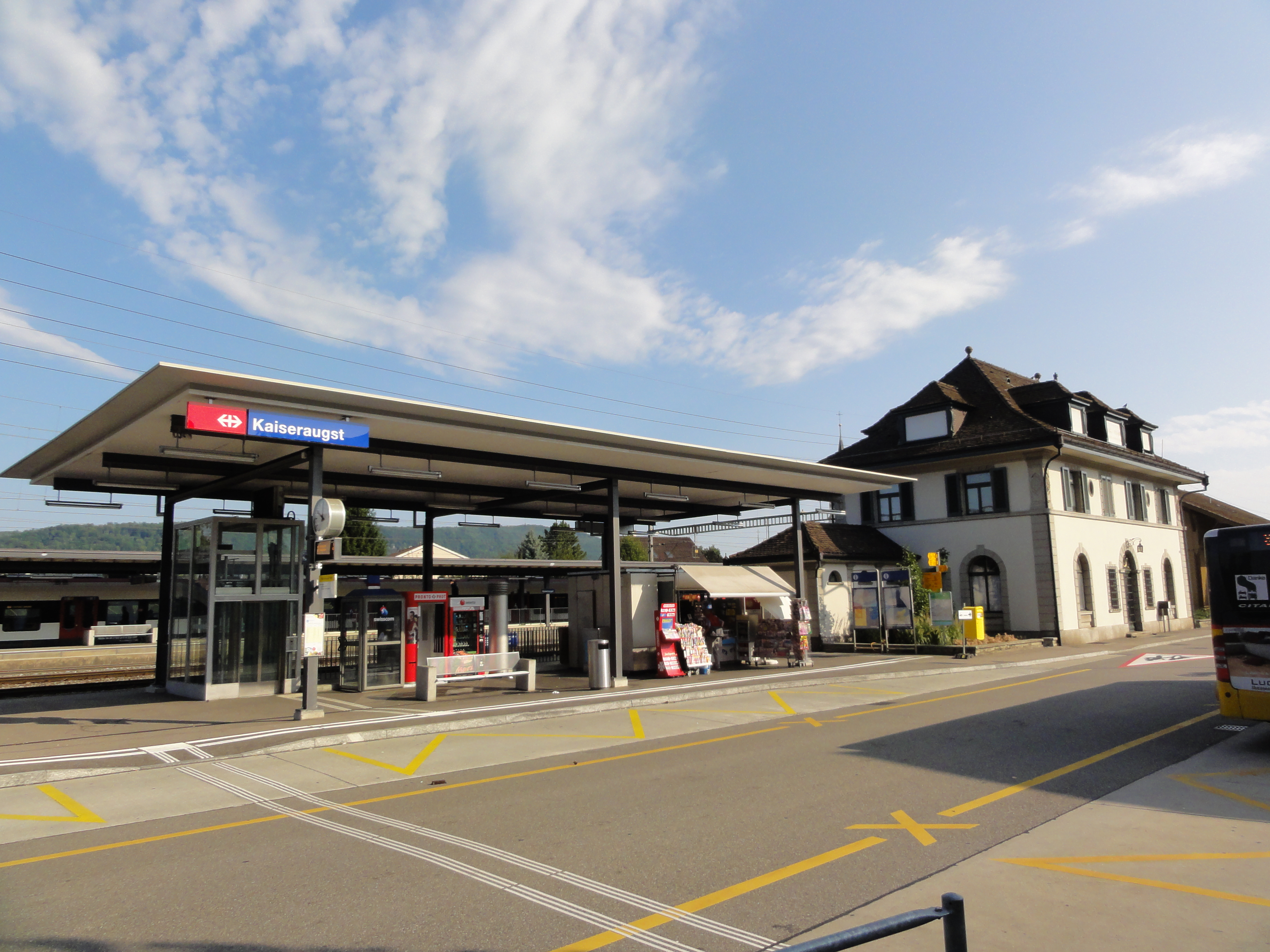
- The station building in 2012

General information
- Location: Kaiseraugst; Switzerland
- Coordinates: 47°32′18.92″N 7°43′26.76″E
- Owner: Swiss Federal Railways
- Line: Bözberg line
- Train operators: Swiss Federal Railways

Services
| Preceding station | Basel S-Bahn | Following station |
|---|---|---|
| Pratteln Salina Raurica towards Basel SBB | S1 | Rheinfelden Augarten towards Laufenburg or Frick |
| Pratteln towards Basel SBB | S11 | Rheinfelden towards Stein-Säckingen |
Location
- Location within Switzerland Location within Canton of Aargau

Kaiseraugst railway station (German: Bahnhof Kaiseraugst) is a railway station in the municipality of Kaiseraugst, in the Swiss canton of Aargau. It is an intermediate stop on the Bözberg line and is served by local trains only.

The station is located 750 m (2,460 ft) north of the Roman site Augusta Raurica.

== Services ==
As of the December 2025 timetable change, the following services stop at Kaiseraugst:

- Basel S-Bahn /: half-hourly or better service between Basel SBB and Stein-Säckingen and hourly service to Frick or Laufenburg.

== See also ==
- Rail transport in Switzerland
