= Möhlin railway station =

Railway station in Möhlin, Switzerland

Möhlin
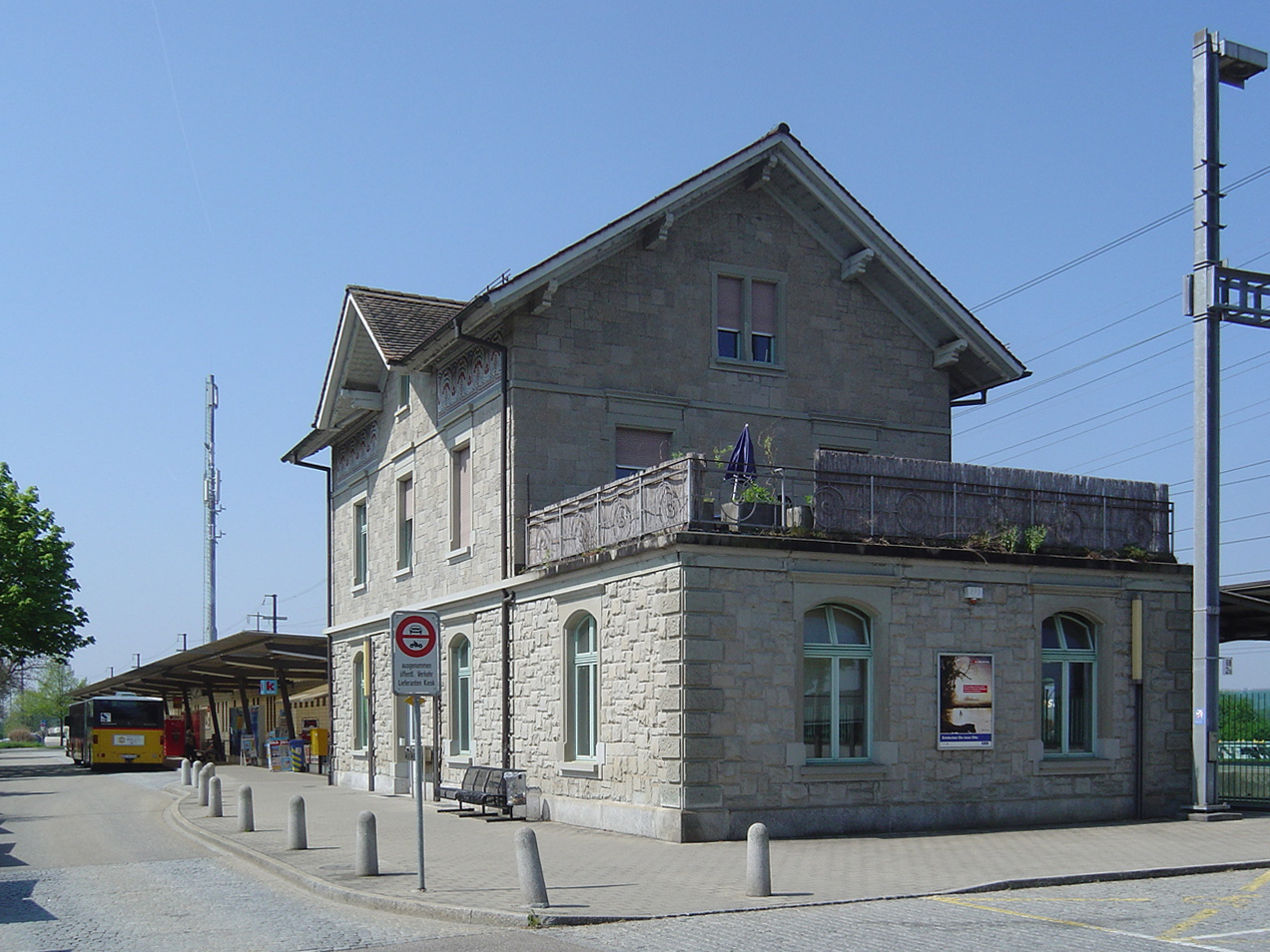
- The station building in 2007

General information
- Location: Möhlin; Switzerland
- Coordinates: 47°33′42.98″N 7°50′2.54″E
- Owner: Swiss Federal Railways
- Line: Bözberg line
- Train operators: Swiss Federal Railways

Services
Preceding station	SBB CFF FFS	Following station
Rheinfelden towards Basel SBB	IR 36	Stein-Säckingen towards Zürich Airport
Preceding station	Basel S-Bahn	Following station
Rheinfelden towards Basel SBB	S1	Mumpf towards Laufenburg or Frick
Rheinfelden towards Basel SBB	S11	Stein-Säckingen Terminus
Location
- Location within Switzerland

Möhlin railway station (German: Bahnhof Möhlin) is a railway station in the municipality of Möhlin, in the Swiss canton of Aargau. It is an intermediate stop on the Bözberg line and is served by local and regional trains.

== Services ==
As of the December 2025 timetable change, the following services stop at Möhlin:

- : half-hourly service from Basel SBB to Zürich Hauptbahnhof, with every other train continuing to Zürich Airport.
- Basel S-Bahn /: half-hourly or better service between Basel SBB and Stein-Säckingen and hourly service to Frick or Laufenburg.
