= Mumpf railway station =

Railway station in Mumpf, Switzerland

Mumpf
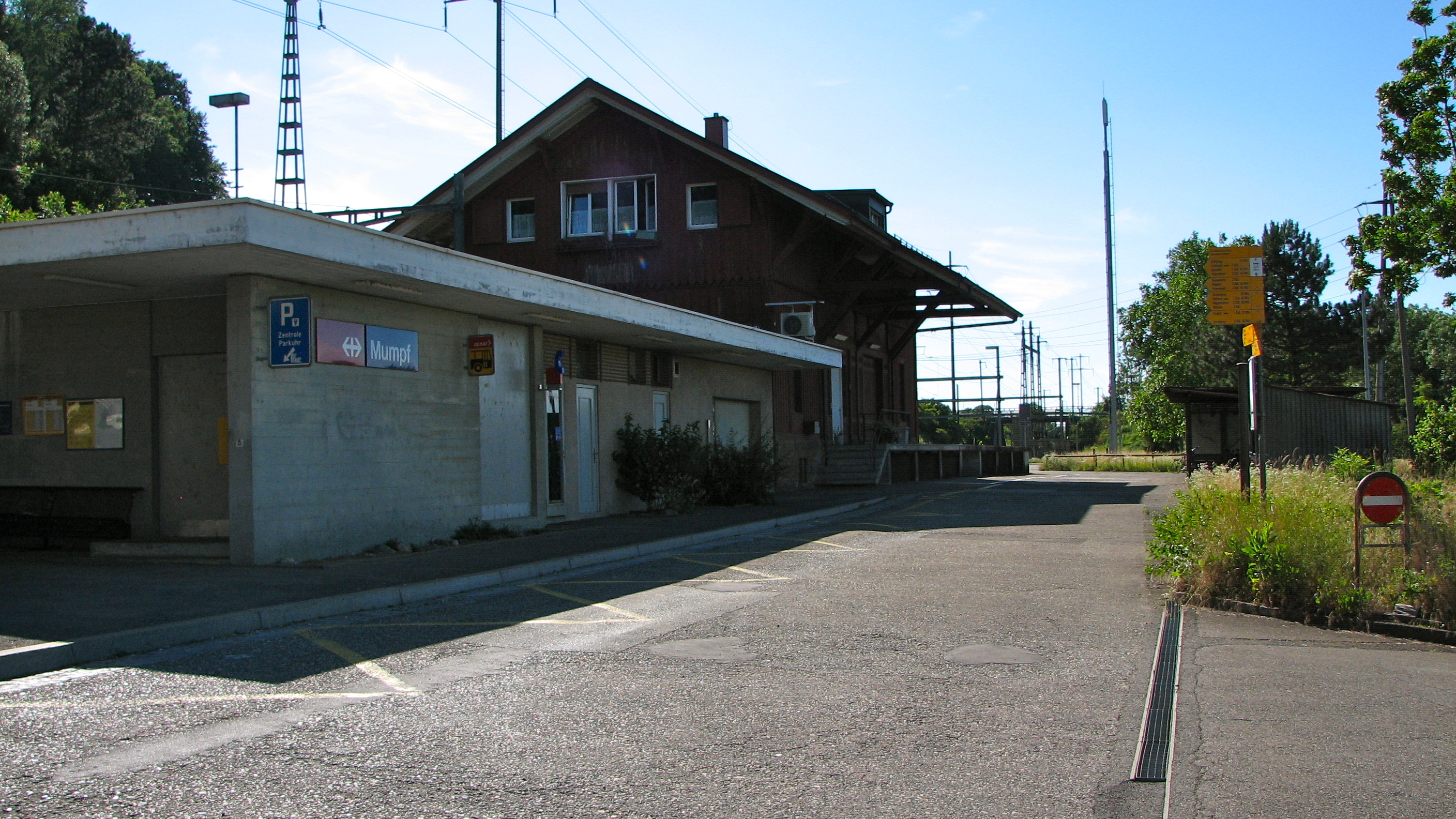
- The station building in 2007

General information
- Location: Mumpf; Switzerland
- Coordinates: 47°32′51″N 7°54′35.28″E
- Owner: Swiss Federal Railways
- Line: Bözberg line
- Train operators: Swiss Federal Railways

Services
Preceding station	Basel S-Bahn	Following station
Möhlin towards Basel SBB	S1	Stein-Säckingen towards Laufenburg or Frick
Location
- Location within Switzerland

Mumpf railway station (German: Bahnhof Mumpf) is a railway station in the municipality of Mumpf, in the Swiss canton of Aargau. It is an intermediate stop on the Bözberg line and is served by local trains only.

== Services ==
As of the December 2025 timetable change, the following services stop at Mumpf:

- Basel S-Bahn: half-hourly service between Basel SBB and Stein-Säckingen and hourly service to Frick or Laufenburg.
