= Rheinfelden railway station (Switzerland) =

Railway station in the canton of Aargau, Switzerland, on the High Rhine

Rheinfelden
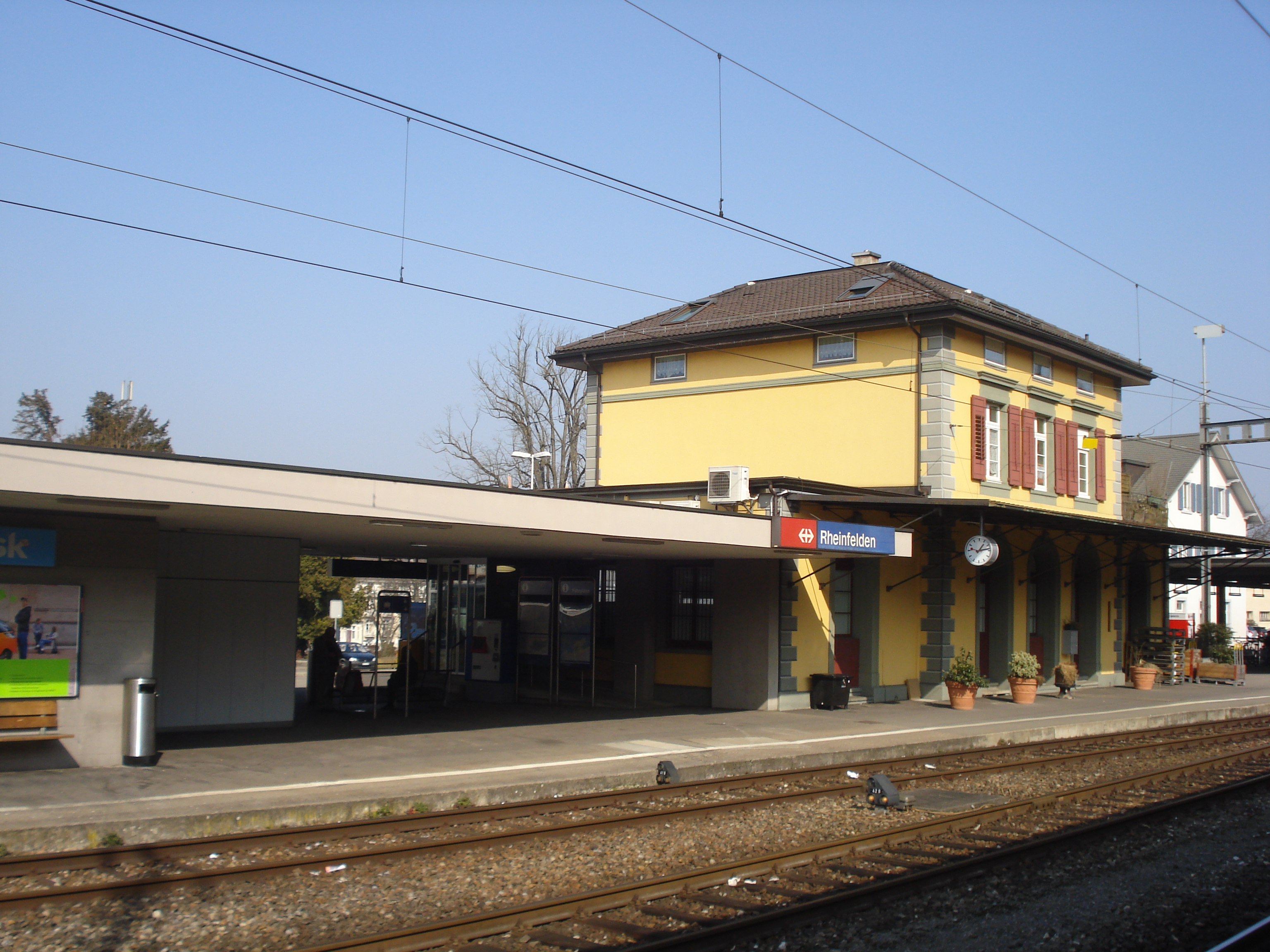
- The station building in 2011

General information
- Location: Rheinfelden; Switzerland
- Coordinates: 47°33′4.464″N 7°47′31.596″E
- Owner: Swiss Federal Railways
- Line: Bözberg line
- Train operators: Swiss Federal Railways

Services
Preceding station	SBB CFF FFS	Following station
Basel SBB Terminus	IR 36	Möhlin towards Zürich Airport
Preceding station	Basel S-Bahn	Following station
Rheinfelden Augarten towards Basel SBB	S1	Möhlin towards Laufenburg or Frick
Kaiseraugst towards Basel SBB	S11	Möhlin towards Stein-Säckingen
Location
- Location within Switzerland

Rheinfelden railway station (German: Bahnhof Rheinfelden) is a railway station in the municipality of Rheinfelden, in the Swiss canton of Aargau. It is an intermediate stop on the Bözberg line and is served by local and regional trains.

== Services ==
As of the December 2025 timetable change, the following services stop at Rheinfelden:

- : half-hourly service from Basel SBB to Zürich Hauptbahnhof, with every other train continuing to Zürich Airport.
- Basel S-Bahn /: half-hourly or better service between Basel SBB and Stein-Säckingen and hourly service to Frick or Laufenburg.
