= Koblenz–Stein-Säckingen railway line =

Railway line in Switzerland

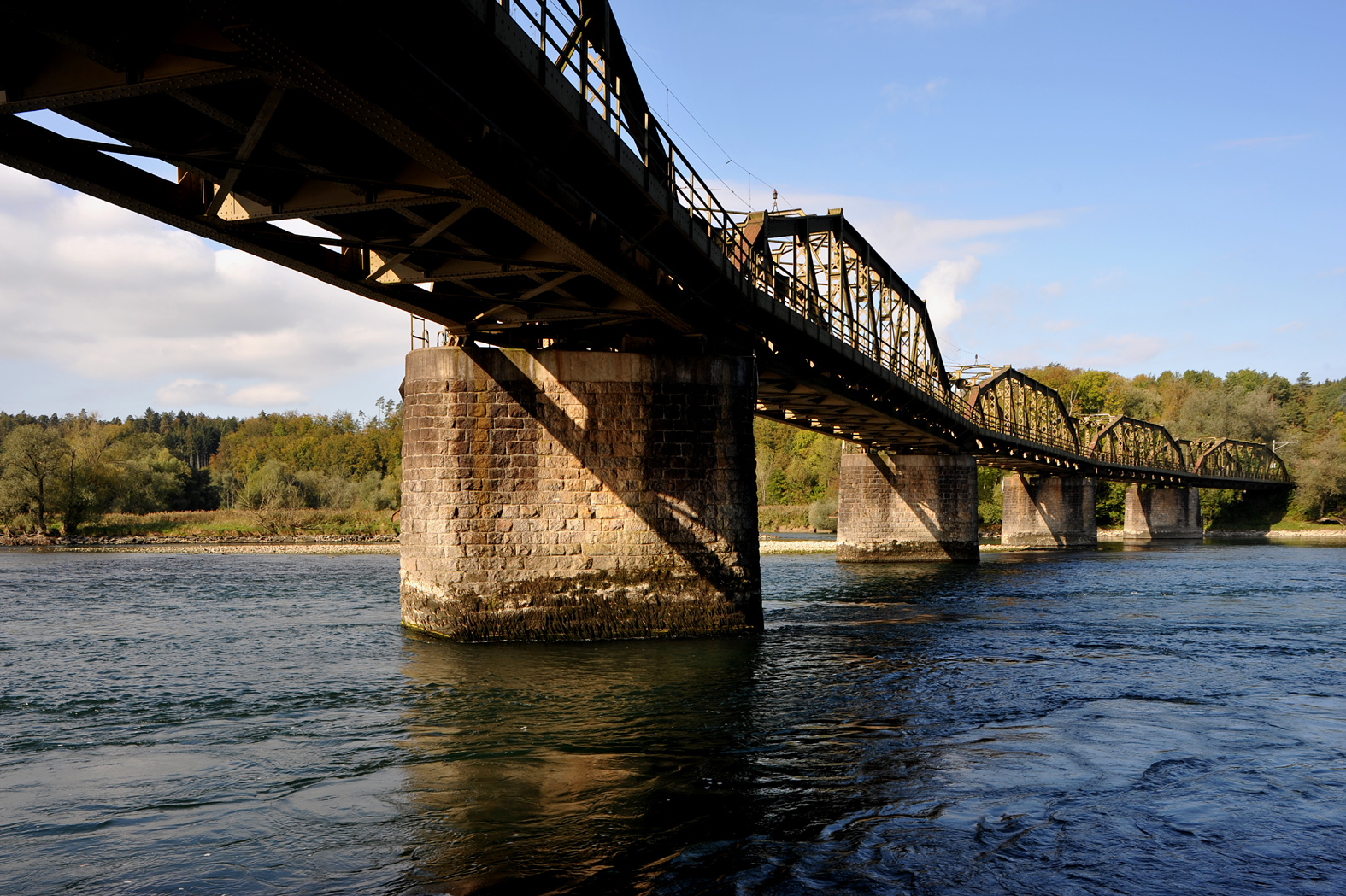
- The Koblenz Aare railway bridge

Overview
- Owner: Swiss Federal Railways
- Line number: 700

Service
- Services: Basel S-Bahn S1
- Rolling stock: SBB RABe 523

History
- Opened: 1 August 1892
- Electrification: 17 December 1944

Technical
- Line length: 26.1 km (16.2 mi)
- Number of tracks: 1
- Track gauge: 1,435 mm (4 ft 8 1/2 in) standard gauge
- Electrification: 15 kV 16.7 Hz AC overhead catenary

The Koblenz–Stein-Säckingen railway line is a standard gauge railway line in the canton of Aargau in Switzerland. It runs 26.1 kilometres (16.2 mi) from a junction with the Bözberg line at Stein-Säckingen to Koblenz and a junction with the Turgi–Koblenz–Waldshut line. Swiss Federal Railways (SBB) owns and operates the line.

Although the line forms part of the most direct route between Basel and Winterthur, through passenger service ended in 1994. The Basel S-Bahn operates as far east as Laufenburg. There are periodic discussions about restoring through passenger service over the entire route.

== History ==
The Bötzberg Railway (German: Bötzbergbahn), a joint venture of the Swiss Northeastern Railway and Swiss Central Railway, opened the line on 1 August 1892. All three companies were incorporated into Swiss Federal Railways on its creation on 1 January 1902. The line was electrified at 15 kV 16.7 Hz AC in 1944. Passenger service between Laufenburg and Koblenz ended on 28 May 1994.

Since the withdrawal of through passenger service in 1994, various localities have advocated for its reintroduction. One proposal would have regular InterRegio service between Basel and Winterthur, using this line and then the Winterthur–Bülach–Koblenz line east of Koblenz. Supporters of the concept point to the growth potential of the Fricktal region and consider the replacement bus service inadequate. As of 2020, neither the cantonal government nor the Federal Council has supported resuming service.

== Route ==
The line begins at Stein-Säckingen, splitting off from the Bözberg line just east of the station. It is single-tracked with passing sidings. For most of its route it runs parallel to the High Rhine river. The only intermediate station that still sees service is Laufenburg, 9 kilometres (5.6 mi) east of Stein-Säckingen. Laufenburg is the eastern terminus of passenger service over the line; from there to Koblenz it has been freight-only since 1994. Just outside Koblenz the Koblenz Aare railway bridge carries the line over the Aare river. After crossing the river, the line joins the Turgi–Koblenz–Waldshut line just south of Koblenz station.

== Operation ==
SBB operates the S1 line of the Basel S-Bahn to Laufenburg, providing hourly service to Basel SBB. Further connections are available at Stein-Säckingen. As of 2021, most services are operated by SBB RABe 523 multiple units. There continues to be regular freight service over the route. PostAuto Schweiz operates bus services between Laufenburg and Koblenz.
