= Rheinfelden railway station =

Rheinfelden railway station could refer to:

- Rheinfelden railway station (Switzerland), a railway station in Rheinfelden, Aargau, Switzerland
- Rheinfelden (Baden) station, a railway station in Rheinfelden, Baden-Württemberg, Germany
