= Koblenz Aare railway bridge =

Railway bridge in Aargau, Switzerland

Coordinates: 47°35′51″N 8°13′17″E

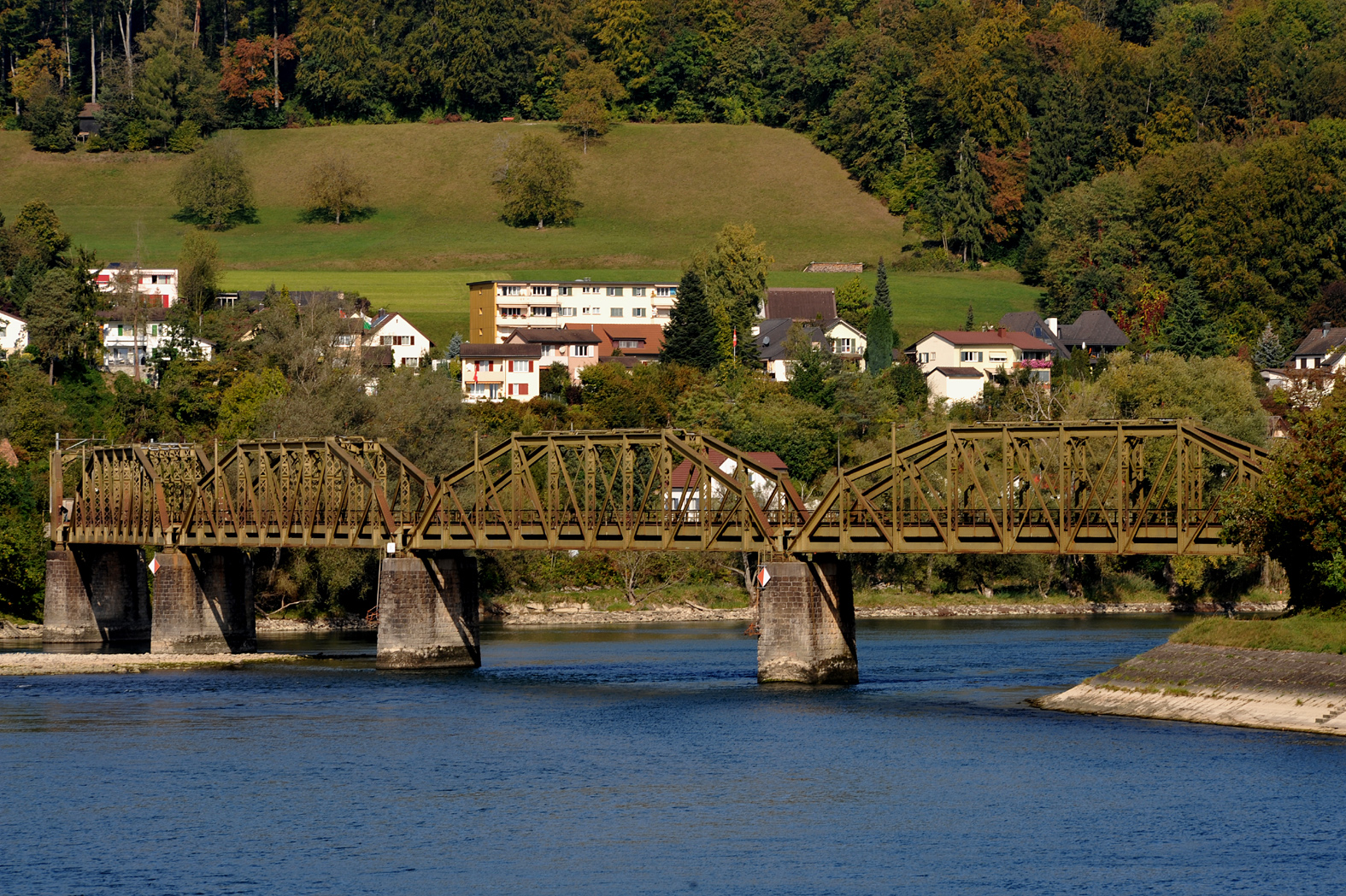
The Koblenz Aare railway bridge

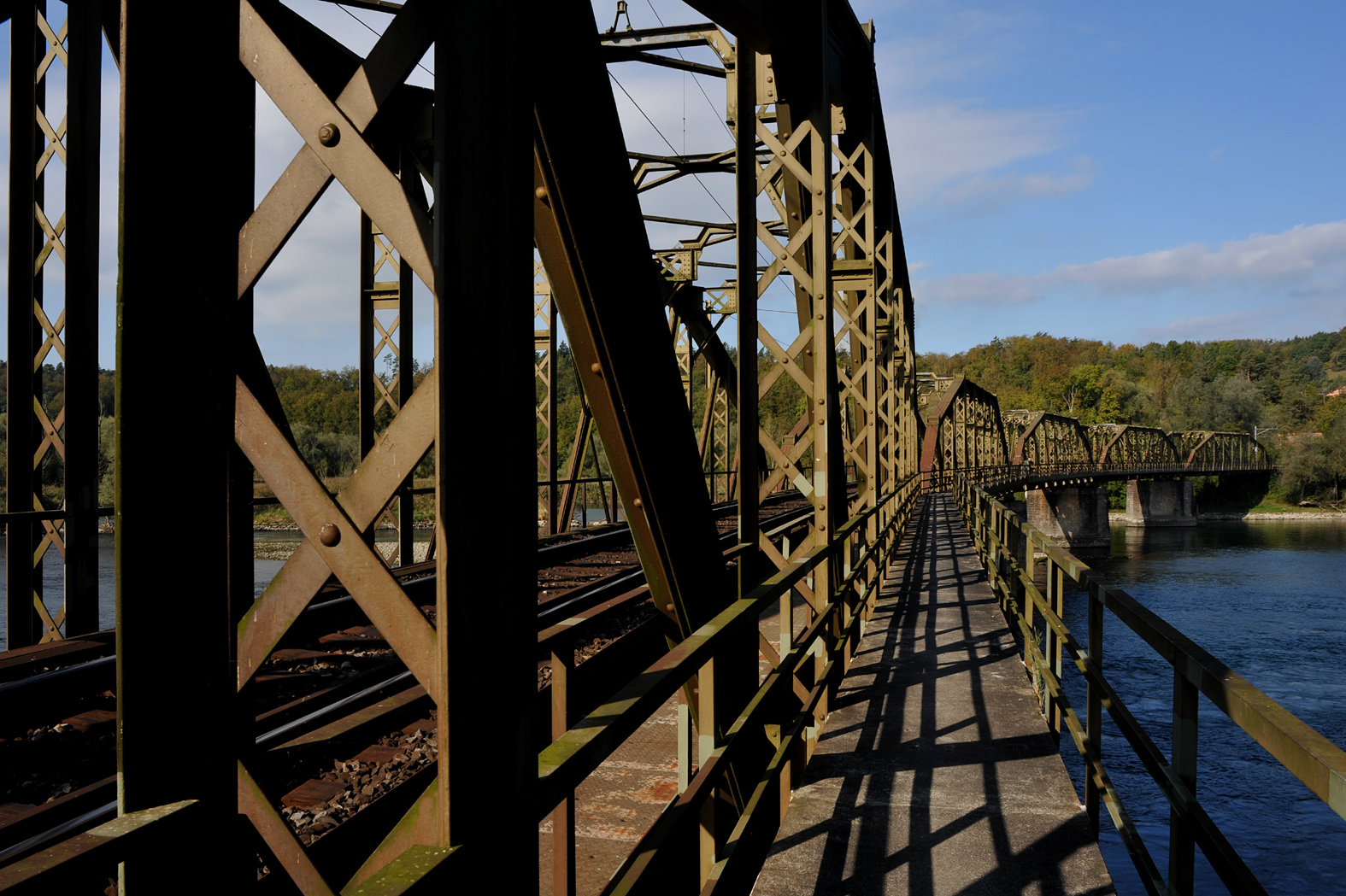
The bridge from the walkway

The Koblenz Aare railway bridge, also known as the Koblenz–Felsenau railway bridge or the Aarebrücke Koblenz, is a single-track railway bridge which carries the Koblenz to Stein-Säckingen line across the River Aare in Switzerland. The bridge dates from 1892 and is listed as a Swiss heritage site of national significance.

The bridge links the municipalities of Koblenz and Leuggern, both of which are in the canton of Aargau. It is adjacent to Koblenz station, but currently only carries freight trains.
