= Stein-Säckingen railway station =

Railway station in Switzerland

Stein-Säckingen
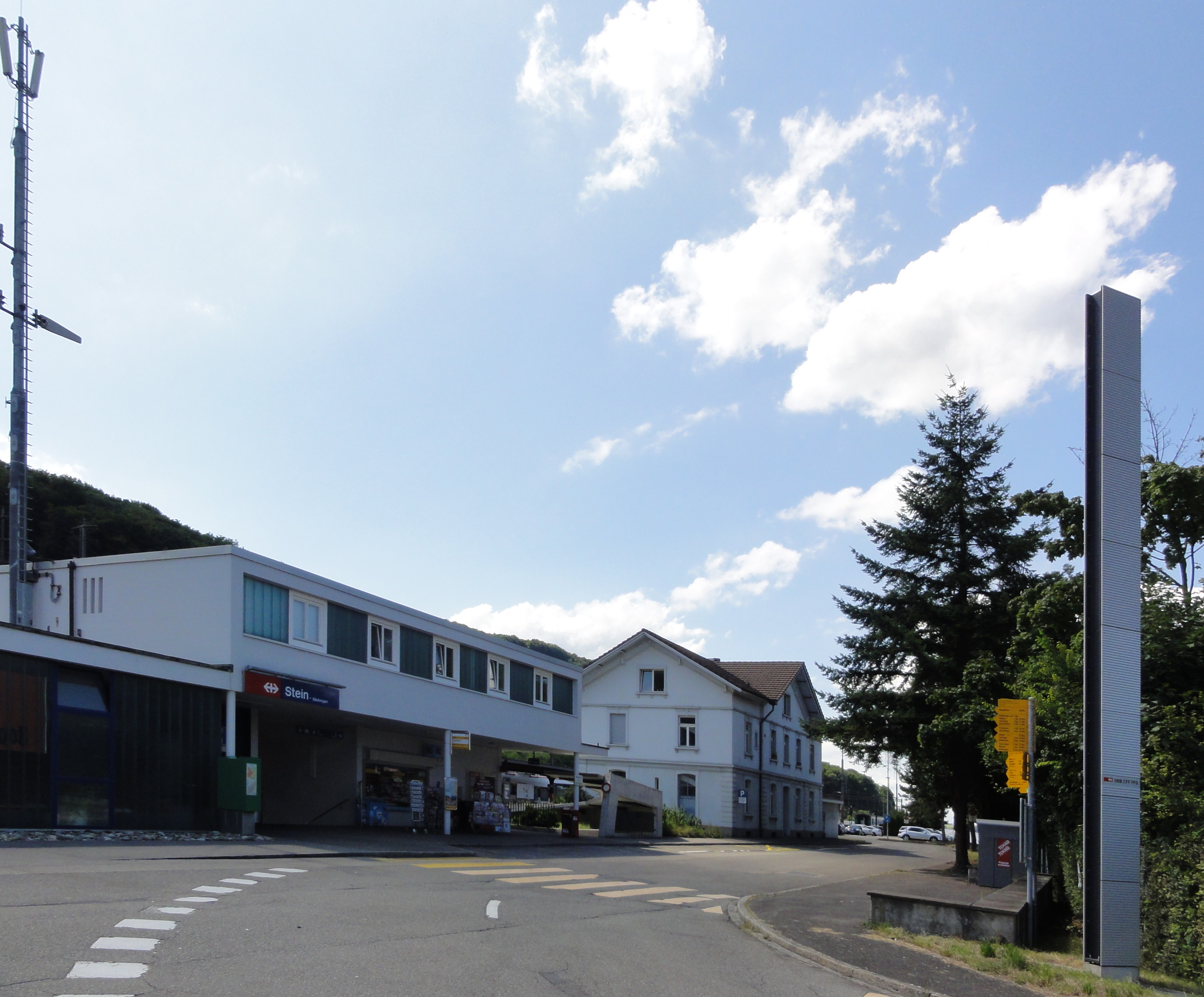
- The station building in 2012

General information
- Location: Stein; Switzerland
- Coordinates: 47°32′29.8″N 7°56′57.1″E
- Owner: Swiss Federal Railways
- Lines: Bözberg line; Koblenz–Stein-Säckingen line
- Train operators: Swiss Federal Railways

Services
Preceding station	SBB CFF FFS	Following station
Möhlin towards Basel SBB	IR 36	Frick towards Zürich Airport
Preceding station	Basel S-Bahn	Following station
Mumpf towards Basel SBB	S1	Laufenburg Terminus
Mumpf towards Basel SBB	S1	Eiken towards Frick
Möhlin towards Basel SBB	S11	Terminus
Location
- Location within Switzerland

Stein-Säckingen railway station (German: Bahnhof Stein-Säckingen) is a railway station in the municipality of Stein, in the Swiss canton of Aargau. It is an intermediate stop on the Bözberg line and western terminus of the Koblenz–Stein-Säckingen line. It is served by local and regional trains.

== Services ==
As of the December 2025 timetable change, the following services stop at Stein-Säckingen:

- : half-hourly service from Basel SBB to Zürich Hauptbahnhof, with every other train continuing to Zürich Airport.
- Basel S-Bahn /: half-hourly or better service to Basel SBB and hourly service to Frick or Laufenburg.
