= Frick railway station =

Railway station in Switzerland

Frick
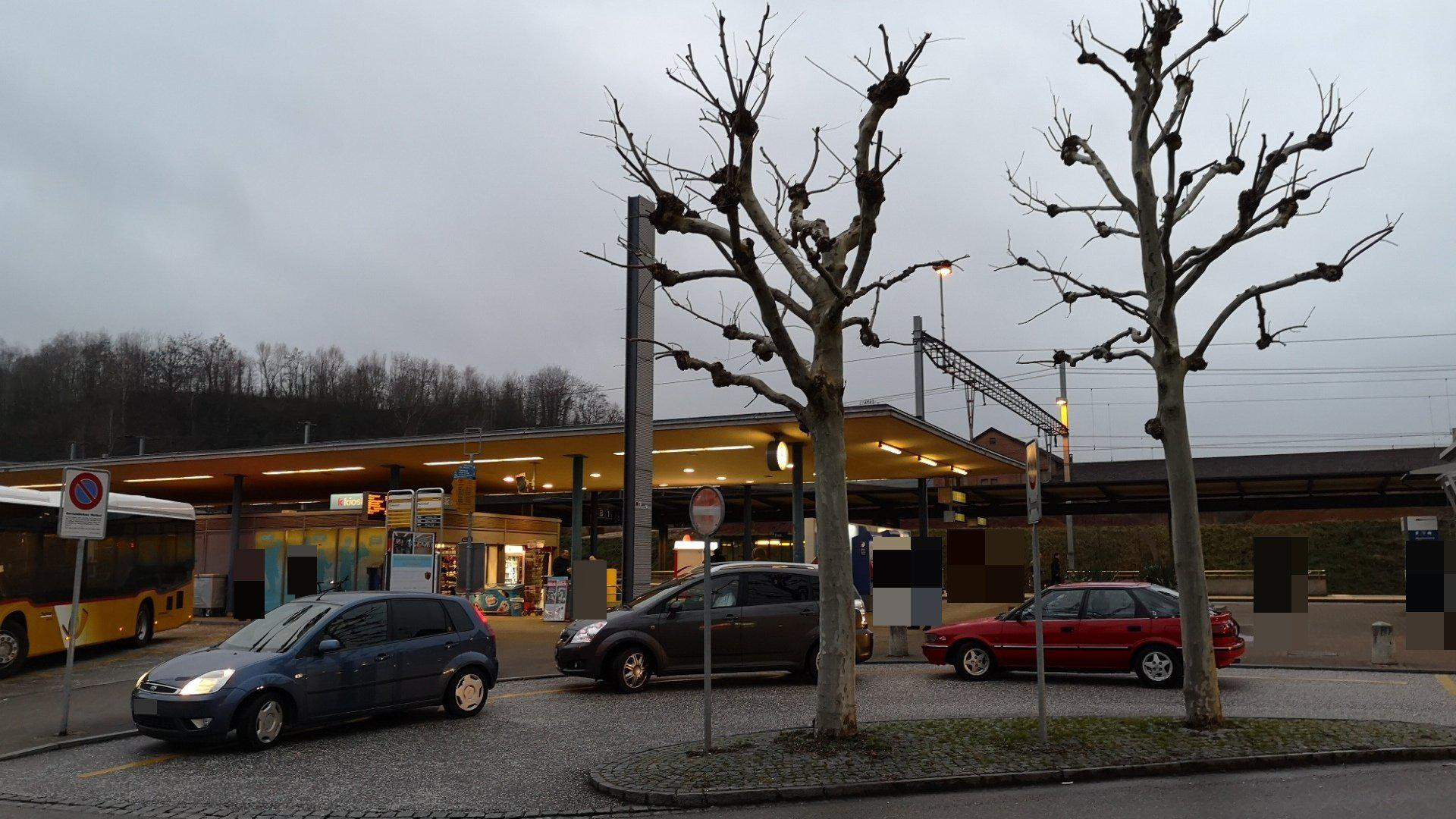
- The station in 2019

General information
- Location: Frick; Switzerland
- Coordinates: 47°30′25″N 8°0′47″E
- Owner: Swiss Federal Railways
- Line: Bözberg line
- Train operators: Swiss Federal Railways

Services
Preceding station	SBB CFF FFS	Following station
Stein-Säckingen towards Basel SBB	IR 36	Brugg AG towards Zürich Airport
Preceding station	Basel S-Bahn	Following station
Eiken towards Basel SBB	S1	Terminus
Location
- Location within Switzerland

Frick railway station (German: Bahnhof Frick) is a railway station in the municipality of Frick, in the Swiss canton of Aargau. It is an intermediate stop on the Bözberg line and is served by local and regional trains.

== Services ==
=== Regional ===
The following regional trains call at Frick:

- InterRegio: half-hourly service from Basel SBB to Zürich Hauptbahnhof, with every other train continuing to Zürich Airport.

=== Local ===
Frick is served by the S1 the Basel S-Bahn:

- S1: hourly service to Basel SBB.
