= Basel SBB railway station =

Railway station in Basel, Switzerland

Basel SBB Bâle CFF
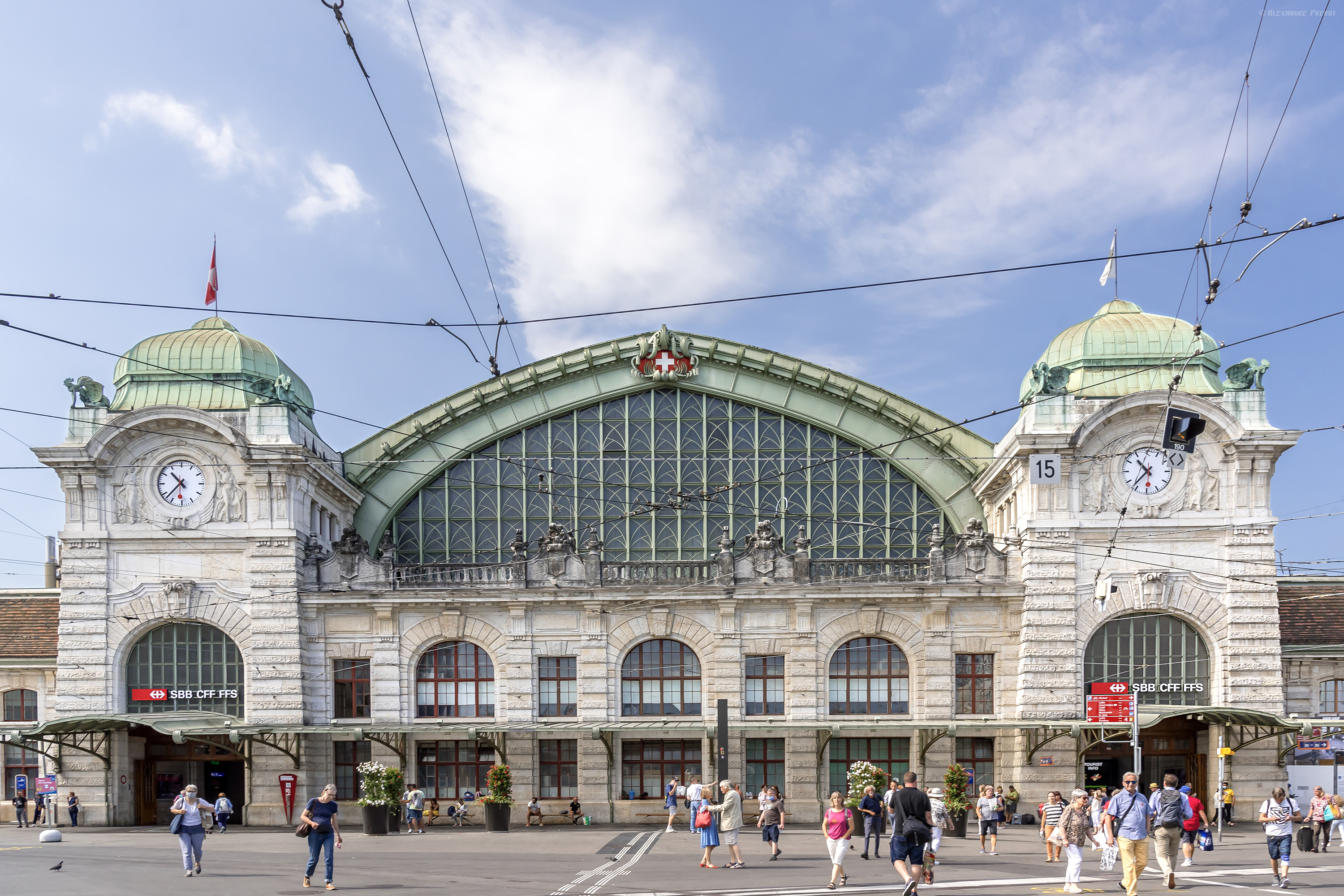
- Main north entrance

General information
- Location: Centralbahnplatz; Basel; Switzerland
- Coordinates: 47°32′49″N 7°35′24″E
- Elevation: 276 m (906 ft)
- Owner: Swiss Federal Railways
- Lines: Basel Connecting Line; Hauenstein line; Bözberg line; Rhine Valley Line; Strasbourg–Basel railway; Basel–Biel railway
- Platforms: 9
- Tracks: 22 (German: Gleise: 12 pass-through (3 non-stop), 7 SBB terminal, 3 SNCF terminal)
- Connections: Tram lines 1 2 8 10 11 16; BVB bus lines

Construction
- Structure type: At-grade
- Architect: 1854/1860: Ludwig Maring; 1907: Emil Faesch, Emanuel La Roche; 1999: Herzog & de Meuron; 2003: Cruz y Ortiz Arquitectos

Other information
- IATA code: ZDH
- Fare zone: 8 (RVL); 10 (tnw)
- Website: Bahnhof Basel SBB

History
- Opened: 19 December 1854; 171 years ago
- Rebuilt: 4 June 1860; 166 years ago (total rebuilt); 24 June 1907; 119 years ago (total rebuilt); 1998/99; 2005 years ago (railway control center); 2003; 23 years ago (renovation, Passarelle, underground car/bicycle park)
- Former names: Centralbahnhof (1854–1902); Schweizer Bundesbahnhof (1902bis)

Key dates
- 1902-03: Demolition of the first non-wooden station
- 1902-07: Provisional railway station in place

Passengers
- 2025: 103,800 per day (SBB, SBB GmbH, SOB)
- Rank: 4 out 1,095 (Note: Tied with Winterthur railway station)
Services
Preceding station	SBB CFF FFS	Following station
Basel Badischer towards Frankfurt (Main) Hbf	EuroCity	Zürich HB towards Milano Centrale
Terminus	EuroCity	Olten towards Milano Centrale
Basel Badischer towards Hamburg-Altona	EuroCity	Liestal towards Interlaken Ost
Basel Badischer towards Hamburg-Altona	EuroCity	Zürich HB Terminus
Terminus	IC 3	Zürich HB towards Chur
Terminus	IC 6	Olten towards Brig
Terminus	IC 21	Olten towards Lugano
Laufen towards Lausanne	IC 51	Terminus
Terminus	IC 61	Liestal towards Interlaken Ost
Terminus	IR 27	Liestal towards Lucerne
Terminus	IR 36	Rheinfelden towards Zürich Airport
Terminus	IR 37	Liestal towards Zürich HB
Preceding station	Südostbahn	Following station
Terminus	IR 26	Olten towards Locarno
Preceding station	BLS	Following station
Laufen towards Biel/Bienne	IR 56	Terminus
Preceding station	DB Fernverkehr	Following station
Reverses direction	ICE 12	Basel Bad Bf towards Berlin Ostbahnhof
Reverses direction	ICE 12	Liestal towards Brig or Interlaken Ost
Reverses direction	ICE 12	Zürich HB towards Chur
Terminus	ICE/ECE 20	Basel Bad Bf towards Hamburg Hbf
Preceding station	TGV Lyria	Following station
Mulhouse towards Paris-Lyon	Paris to Zürich	Zürich HB towards Zürich Hauptbahnhof
Preceding station	ÖBB	Following station
Basel Badischer towards Amsterdam Centraal	Nightjet	Zürich HB Terminus
Basel Badischer towards Berlin Hbf	Nightjet	Zürich HB Terminus
Basel Badischer towards Praha hl.n.	EuroNight	Zürich HB Terminus
Preceding station	TER Grand Est	Following station
Saint-Louis towards Strasbourg	A01	Terminus
Basel St. Johann towards Mulhouse	A15	Terminus
Preceding station	Basel S-Bahn	Following station
Terminus	S1	Muttenz towards Laufenburg or Frick
Terminus	S11	Muttenz towards Stein-Säckingen
Basel Dreispitz towards Delémont	S3	Muttenz towards Olten
Basel Dreispitz towards Laufen	S31	Terminus
Terminus	S33	Muttenz towards Sissach
Terminus	S6	Basel Bad Bf towards Zell (Wiesental)
Location
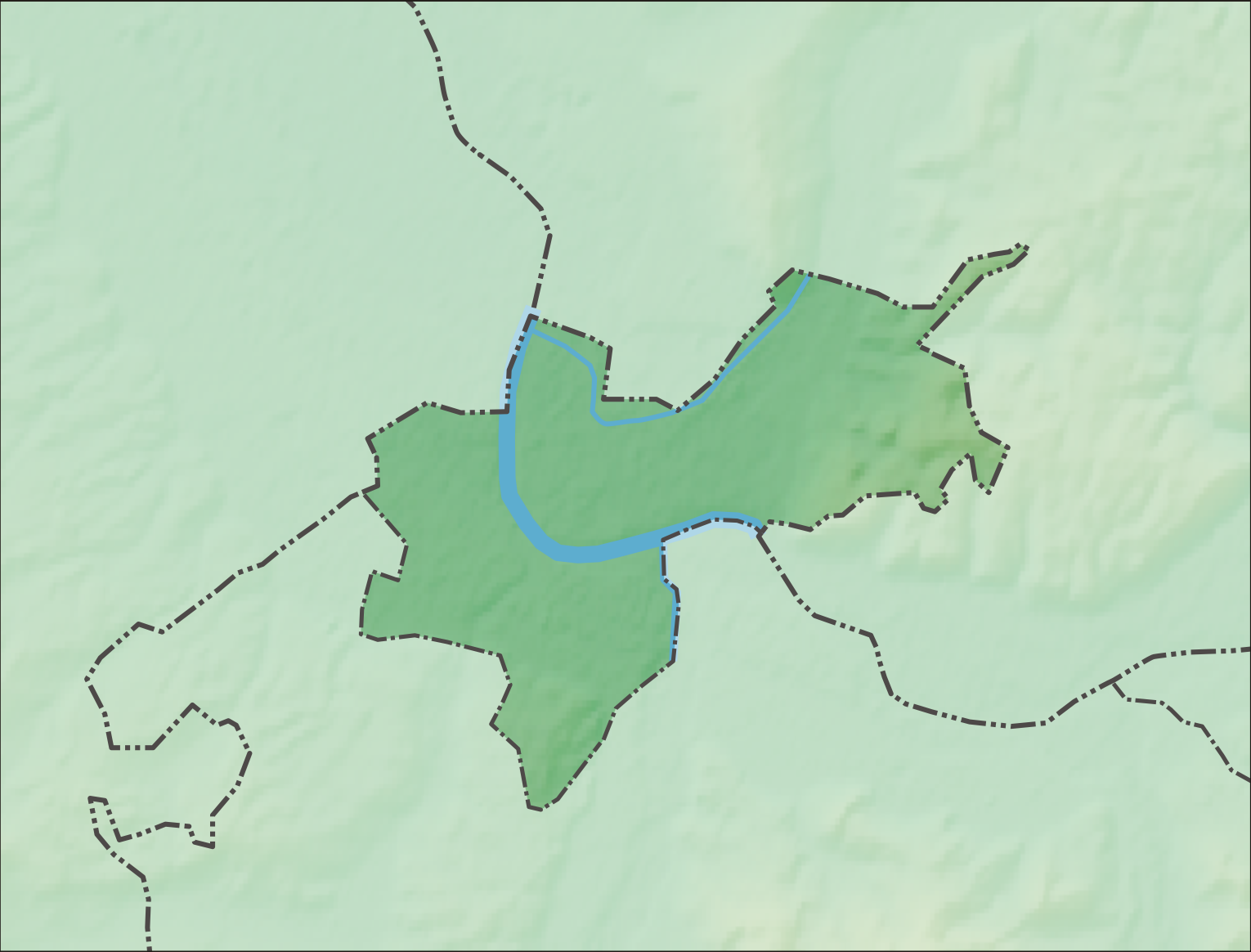
- Location within Switzerland Location within Canton of Basel-Stadt

Basel SBB railway station (German: Bahnhof Basel SBB, or in earlier times Centralbahnhof or Schweizer Bahnhof) is the central railway station in the city of Basel, Switzerland. Opened in 1854 but rebuilt in 1907, it is Europe's busiest international border station: owned by Swiss Federal Railways (SBB CFF FFS) and partly operated by France's SNCF. The city's other large station, Basel Badischer Bahnhof is operated by the German Railway Company Deutsche Bahn and is on the right bank of the Rhine 2 km away.

Trains operated by SBB CFF FFS use Basel SBB to link Basel with destinations within Switzerland and Italy, as do Deutsche Bahn Intercity-Express (ICE) trains to and from Germany, Zürich and Interlaken, most SNCF TGV trains to and from Paris, and some regional trains to and from Alsace. Additionally, the station is served by three lines of the Basel S-Bahn.

The 1907 neo-baroque station building is a heritage site of national significance. It also contains Bâle SNCF (shown in SBB CFF FFS online timetables as Basel SBB Gl. 30–35, and in other online timetables as Basel SNCF), which is located through a border crossing and is used by other trains to and from France. Directly outside the station building is the Centralbahnplatz, which is a major hub of the Basel tramway network, and the Basel terminus of a direct bus service to the EuroAirport.

== Location ==
The station area is situated at the southern side of the city centre, in an elongated area between the Zoological Garden to the west and the Brüglinger Ebene to the east.

The borders of four of Basel's districts come together at the station area. However, the area is, according to the Statistical Office, divided between only two districts: the station itself is located in Gundeldingen, while most of the tracks on the eastern side of the station (including the goods station), along with the Centralbahnplatz in front of the station (including the BIS Tower), are attributed to the St. Alban quarter.

The Elisabethenanlage in front of the Centralbahnplatz belongs to Vorstädte, while the Markthalle opposite Basel SNCF is part of the Am Ring district.

== History ==
=== Beginnings ===
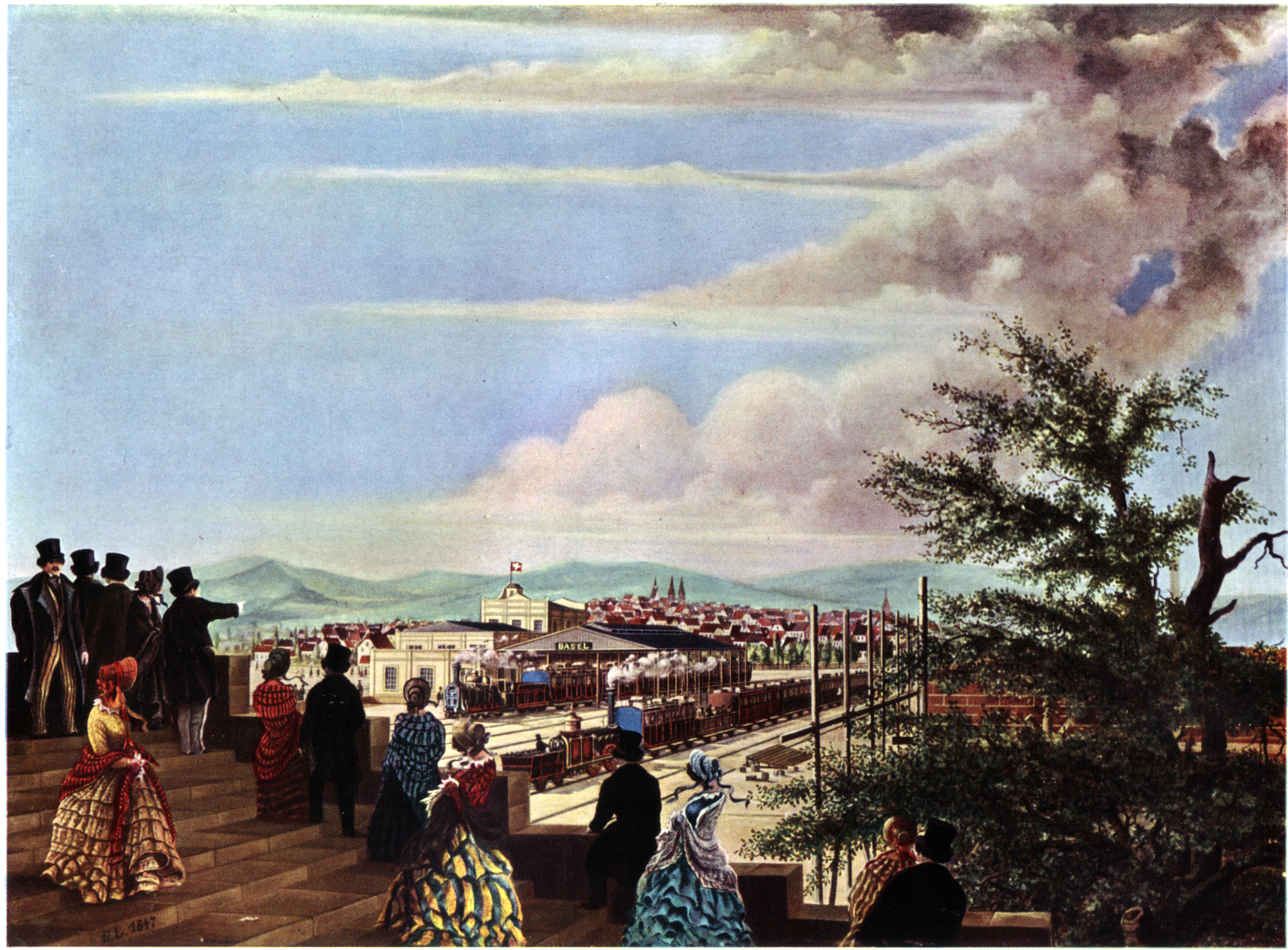
Basel's first railway station, 1847.

The first railway to reach Basel, the Chemin de fer Strasbourg Bâle (StB; Strasbourg Basel Railway), arrived there in 1844. The following year, 1845, the Elsässerbahn (Alsatian Railway) built the first station in the Basel metropolitan area, within the city walls. Basel thereby became the first Swiss city to be connected to the new means of transport.

After the arrival of the railway, there was a passionate debate in Basel about the pros and cons of the railway and its possible continuation towards Lucerne and from there through the Gotthard towards Italy.

Meanwhile, the Rheintalbahn from Mannheim and Karlsruhe also approached Basel from the north; in 1851 it reached Haltingen (a district of Weil am Rhein), on the Swiss border.

In 1853, the Schweizerische Centralbahn railway company (SCB) was founded in Basel. Its purpose was the establishment of a link between the city of Basel and the economic centres of the Mittelland cantons, and perhaps even also the expansion of the transport corridor from Lucerne to the Gotthard.

The Viaduktstrasse in Basel – including the Birsig Viaduct, which is adjacent to the Zoo Basel parking lot – was also the formation of the Elsässerbahn until 1902. Today, the viaduct serves tram lines 1 and 8, as well as motor vehicle traffic, and a plaque on the bridge railing recalls its earlier role as a rail bridge.

=== Provisional station ===
In 1854, construction on the future Hauenstein railway line began. Right up until the opening of the first section of the route from Basel to Liestal, the controversial question of the site and design of the Basel railway station remained unresolved.

However, to accommodate the commencement of railway operations on 19 December 1854, the Centralbahn built a simple temporary timber structure, according to plans developed by chief architect Ludwig Maring. By the opening day, all of the temporary station buildings had been completed, including a timber train shed.

This modest provisional station, equipped with makeshift facilities, was made up of individual detached buildings and was used only for just under six years. The station site consisted of the station building, a goods shed, a carriage and locomotive shed and a turntable at the railhead. As the station building stood on the northeastern side of the station, alongside the station yard, the station was not configured as a terminus.

The provisional station served only as the starting point of the SCB lines, and had no connection with either the French station or the Badischer Bahnhof, which was opened in 1855 as the terminus of the Rheintalbahn.

=== Centralbahnhof ===
On 29 June 1857, the Grand Council of Basel-Stadt agreed to the construction of a link between the French line and the Centralbahn and the erection of a through station in the field in front of the Elisabethen-Bollwerk. The city bore the cost of the land purchase.

At the start of 1859, the SCB began construction work on the site of the new station, to a design by Maring. In addition to a passenger station, the new station yard featured a goods station relocated to the Gundeldingen district, and two new locomotive sheds, one of them for the SCB, and the other for the Chemins de fer de l'Est, which had taken over the StB in 1854.

On 4 June 1860, railway operations began at the new Basel Centralbahnhof. However, it was not until May 1861 that all the new facilities were completed.

The Centralbahnhof was a joint station, with the northern facade of its station building facing the newly created Centralbahnplatz. On each side of the station building were the boarding halls, each with two tracks – on the eastern side for the Swiss trains and on the western side and for the French trains. To the south of the station building were the goods shed and two large warehouses, with an access road from the Güterstrasse.

In subsequent years, modifications were made to the Centralbahnhof to enable it to deal with its substantially increasing traffic, including trains entering and leaving Basel along a number of new lines:

- The connecting line between Basel Badischer Bahnhof and the Centralbahnhof, which was handed over to traffic on 3 November 1873.
- The Bözberg railway line, which was opened on 2 August 1875; built by the Bötzberg Railway, a joint venture of the SCB and the Schweizerische Nordostbahn, it linked Basel with Zürich via Pratteln and Rheinfelden.
- The Jura Railway, which, from 25 September 1875, formed a connection from Basel into western Switzerland and the Franche Comté, via its junction at Delémont and branches to Biel/Bienne and Delle, respectively.

However, the Centralbahnhof eventually ran out of capacity to handle any further additional traffic.

In 1875, as a first measure of relief, the marshalling of freight trains was relocated to a makeshift yard to the east of the station, on an open field known as "auf dem Wolf". At around that time, discussions began with the aim of lowering the tracks and replacing the troublesome urban level crossings on the Elsässerbahn and at the Centralbahnhof. In 1874, provisional timber pedestrian bridges had already been built at Margarethenstrasse und Heumattstrasse; they were later replaced by iron structures. From 1879, the Pfeffingerstrasse passed underneath the station in a tunnel near the present location of the Peter Merian Bridge.

Finally, in 1898, following the referendum on the nationalisation of Switzerland's railways, the Swiss Federal Council decided to go ahead with the following:

- construction of a new Centralbahnhof on the existing site;
- lowering of the whole station area by 2.7 metres (8 ft 10 in);
- relocation of the Elsässerbahn to a cutting, in a wide arc around the city;
- relocation of the entire freight and warehouse facility to the provisional marshalling yard at "auf den Wolf".

=== Provisional new Centralbahnhof ===
The definitive project for a new Centralbahnhof in Basel was developed in 1899. On 16 March 1900, the Federal Council gave approval to the plans.

The lowering of the whole station area and the access lines required careful planning. The first step was the relocation of goods traffic to the Wolf station, and on 12 May 1901 the Alsace line was reopened in its new lower position and wide arc.

On the vacated, lowered, area south of the original Centralbahnhof, the provisional station was built, and on 2 June 1902 it went into operation.

Access to the provisional station was also from the south, via Güterstrasse. To facilitate access, various streets were extended, as were two tram lines. The provisional station remained in operation until 24 June 1907. The provisional facilities and access roads were then dismantled and the two tram lines laid into Güterstrasse. A station underpass to Gundeldingen was built roughly in the location of the provisional access road.

In 1902–1903, the old station was torn down.

=== Basel SBB station ===
In 1902, the Schweizerische Centralbahn was absorbed by the newly formed Swiss Federal Railways (SBB CFF FFS). The new station, which from then onwards was referred to as Schweizer Bundesbahnhof or Basel SBB, was one of the new Federal Railways' first large building projects. Designed by Emil Faesch and Emmanuel La Roche, the new station was inaugurated on 24 June 1907.

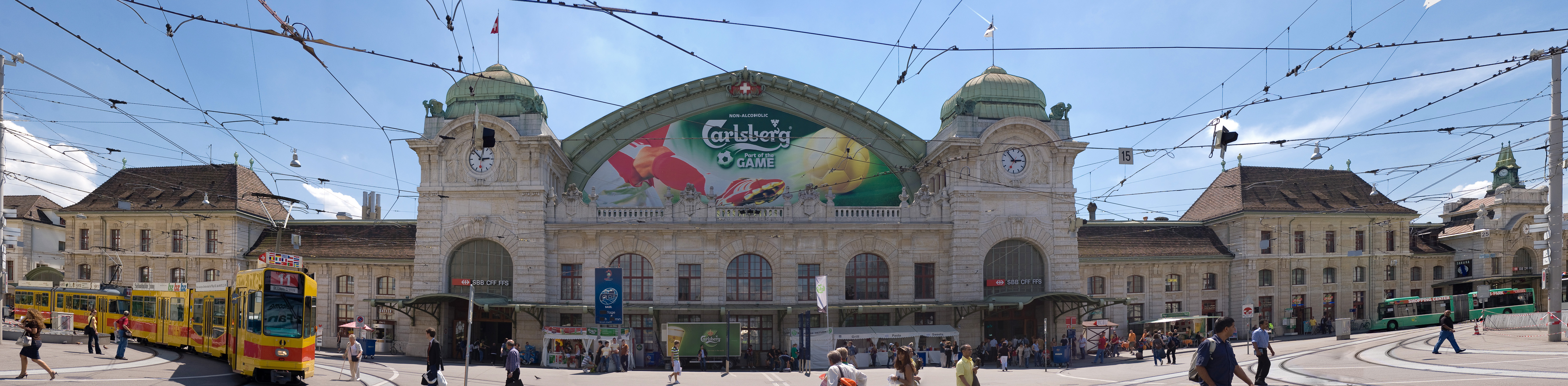
The station building viewed from Centralbahnhofplatz, June 2008.

The Basel SBB station building is characterized by its extraordinary length: Basel SNCF, with its customs facility for the international transit traffic, is "attached" to its western side. The asymmetrical layout of the station creates an external appearance representative of the federal buildings of the time. The station building is aligned to the centre line of the Centralbahnplatz, and features a huge glazed tudor arch window between two clock towers under curved domes.

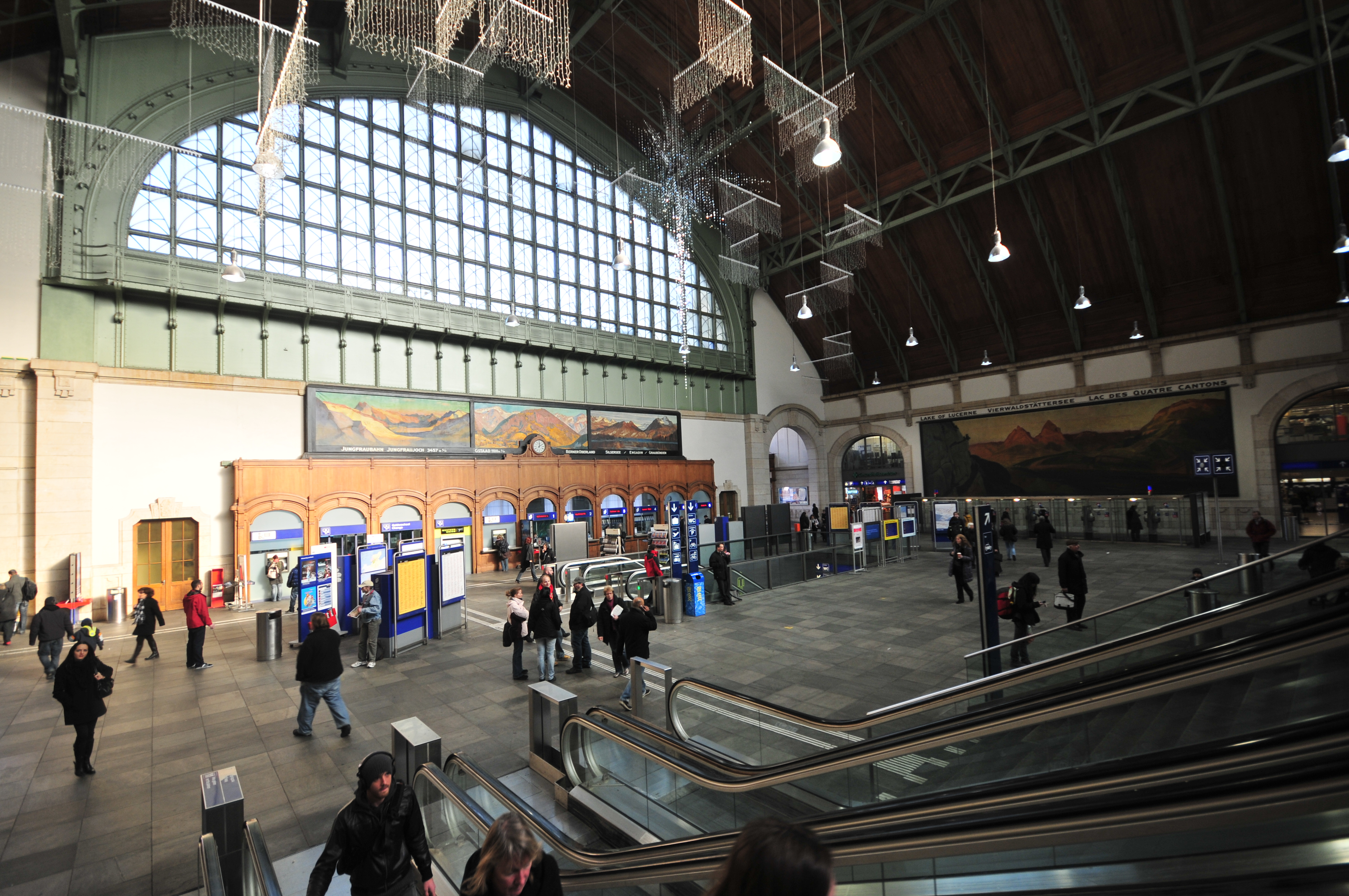
View of the ticket hall.

Behind the facade, one might suspect a terminus, but that is not the case in Basel. Through the entrances in the clock towers, travellers reach the ticket hall under a timber-lined steel-arch structure. Like the rest of the interior, the ticket hall is broad and high. Large murals dating from the 1920s advertise tourist destinations in Switzerland. The ticket and currency exchange offices are embedded in the side wall. The baggage check-in and hand luggage storage facilities were formerly also located here, but today they are in the basement, and accessed by means of an escalator and stairs.

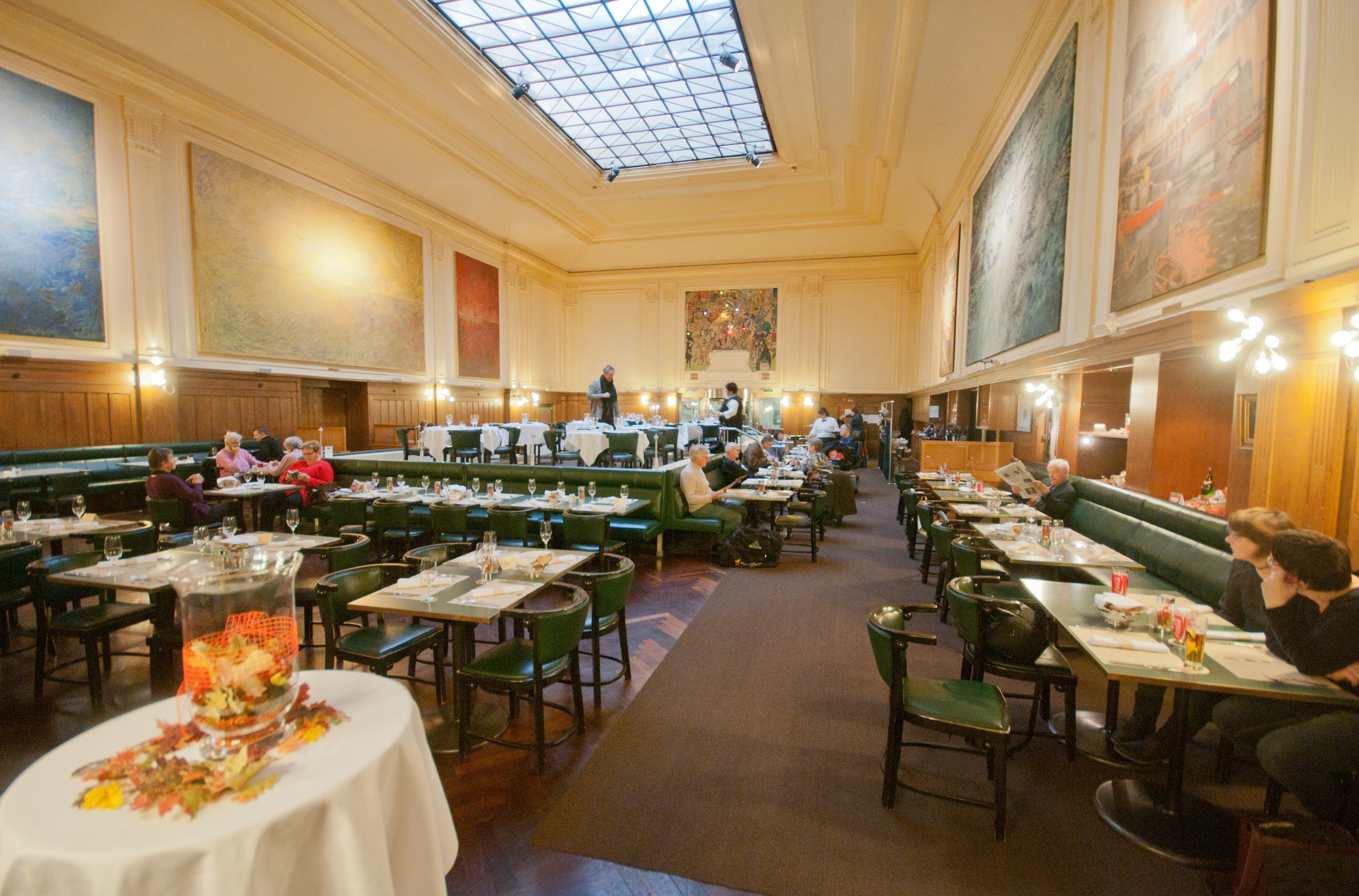
The remaining station restaurant.

In the eastern part of the station, the baggage claim was formerly to be found where the travel centre is now located. The first/second class restaurants (now Migros) and the third class facility (now a brasserie/kiosk) were in the north west wing. The station was previously known for its station buffets, but these were gradually closed down in the 1990s. The high rooms, their walls decorated with murals, now house other commercial uses together with the sole remaining specialty restaurant.

A separate entrance, on the Centralbahnstrasse west of the Centralbahnplatz, leads to the Alsace-bound trains at Basel SNCF.

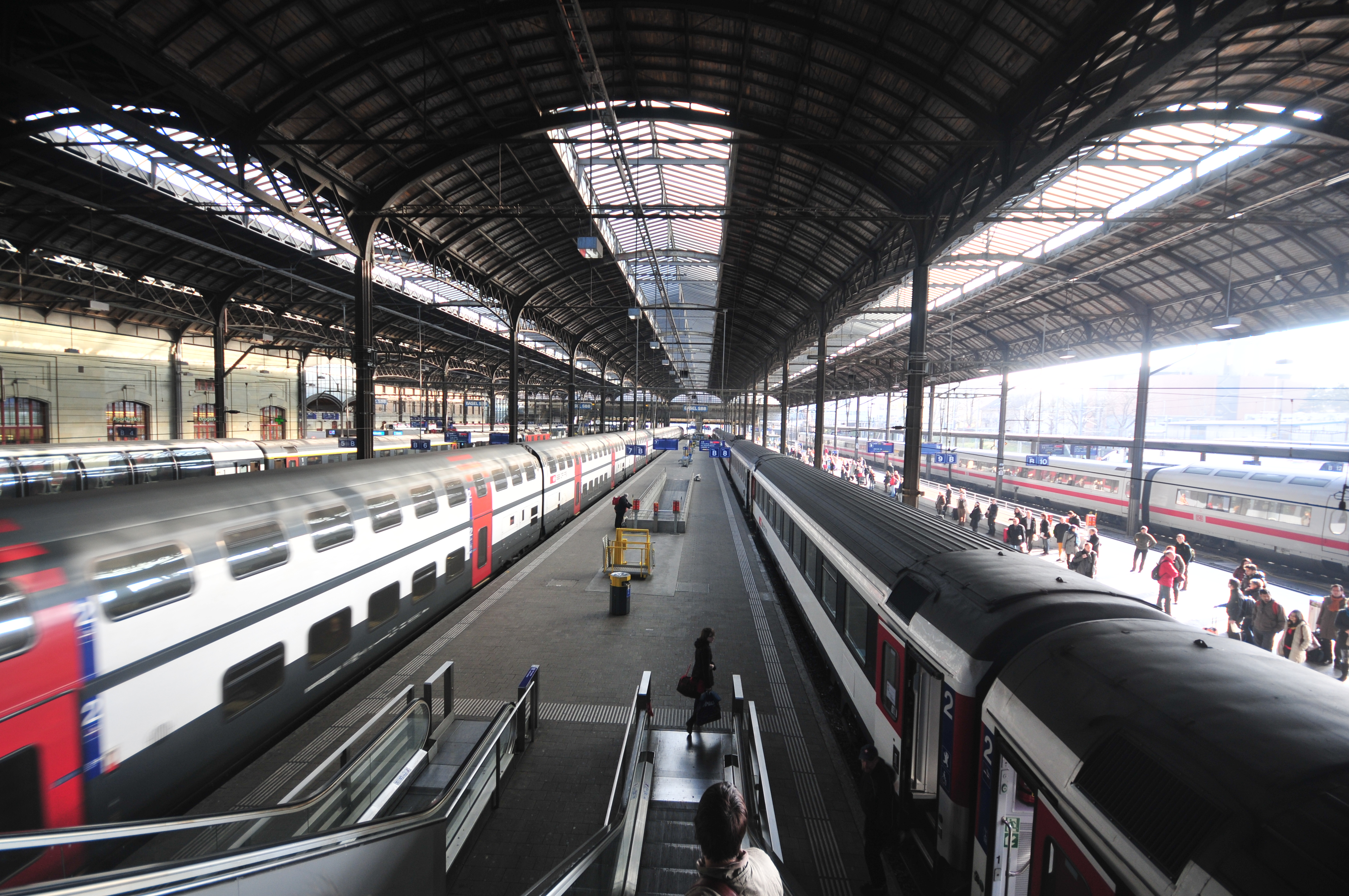
Inside the train shed.

Initially, the platform allocation at Basel SBB corresponded to the private railway age, because the platforms were separated according to the direction of travel. The station originally had 10 tracks, of which the three bay platforms 1 to 3 were previously reserved for local traffic. Tracks 1 to 10 are spanned by a five aisle train shed, which was created in 1905 by Albert Buss & Cie. of Pratteln in Basel. The train shed is 93 m (305 ft) wide, and has a length of 120 m (390 ft) (tracks 1/2), 230 m (750 ft) (tracks 3/4) and 200 m (660 ft) (tracks 5–10). Track 4 goes through to Basel SNCF, where it becomes track 30 and the catenary can be switched from the Swiss operating current of 15 kV 16.7 Hz AC to its French equivalent, 25 kV 50 Hz AC.

On the southern side of the station, a double track line, located at a lower level, connects the Basel and Muttenz marshalling yards with the line to France, and is devoted mainly to through freight trains.

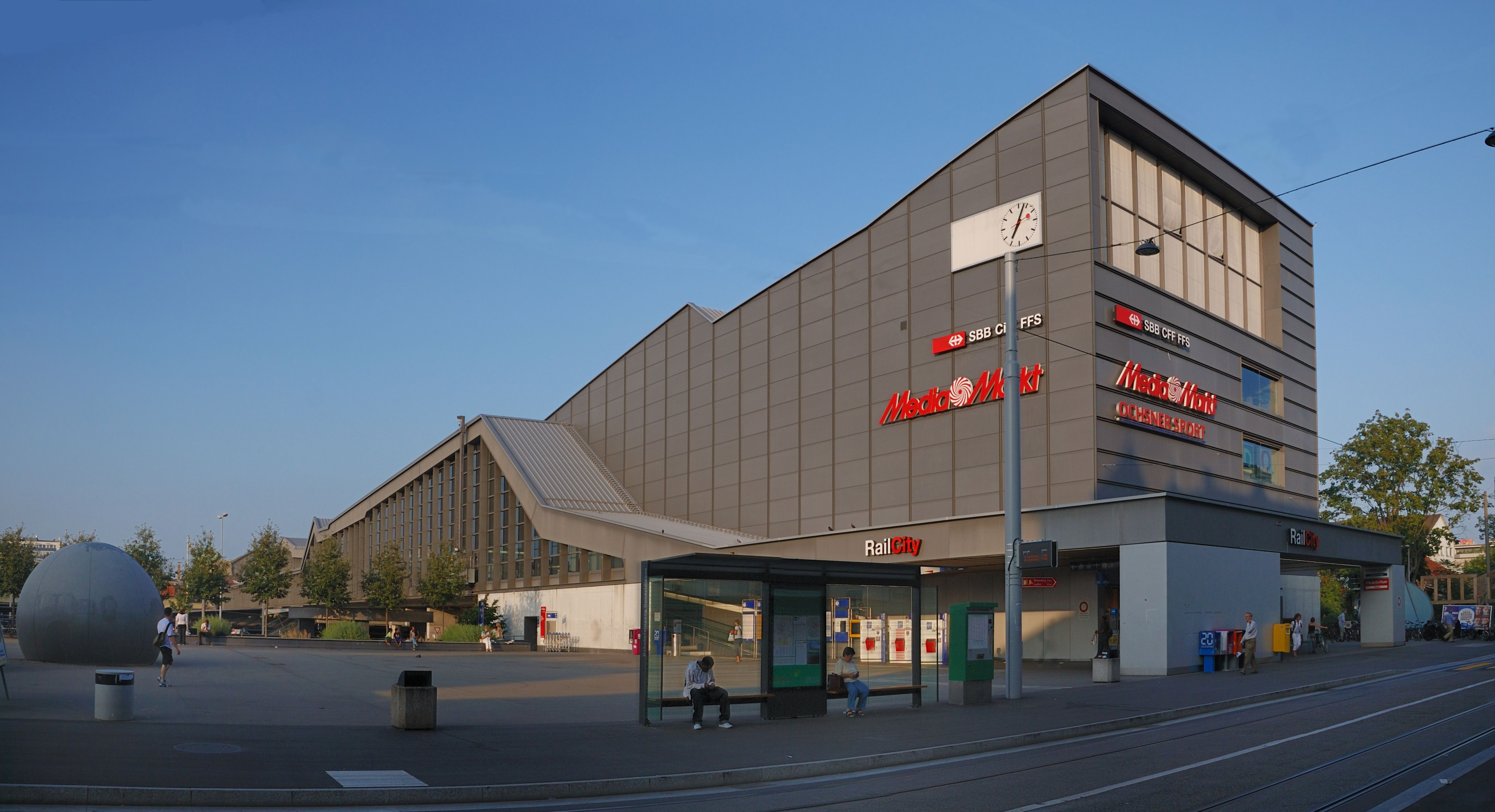
The Passerelle.

Due to the lowering of the tracks at the time of rebuilding, it was difficult to extend the station with additional tracks. On the South side, the platform system has nevertheless been augmented several times: tracks 11 and 12 have been added, the pedestrian underpass has been extended to Gundeldingen, and, in 2003, the new Passerelle was constructed to the new tracks 14 and 15. These changes, together with the introduction of a clock-face timetable in 1982 and the Rail 2000 project, achieved an increase in the station's capacity. Finally, in June 2008, the new tracks 16 and 17 went into operation.

The Passerelle is an element of the new SBB CFF FFS commercial concept known as RailCity. Designed by architects Cruz and Ortiz, it runs over the tracks from the ticket hall at the western end of the train shed to the district of Gundeldingen, and links the platforms with each other. A walkway with shopping opportunities, it is 185 m (607 ft) long, 30 m (98 ft) wide, and replaced the pedestrian underpass. Today, the former underpass is used for operational and logistical purposes.

With the construction of the Passerelle, the RailCenter and the information display were relocated from the ticket hall to the former luggage hall. Additionally, the 1987-built customer service ticket pavilion in the ticket hall was removed, and since then the ticket hall has been able to unfold its ambience to its fullest extent.

Meanwhile, in 1998 and 1999, a new signal box was constructed on behalf of the SBB CFF FFS. The architects of this striking building were Herzog & de Meuron.

== Specificities as border-station ==
=== Infrastructure ===
In order to accommodate traffic and services from three different systems (D/CH/F), the station and the nearby tracks are designed to be multi-system capable.

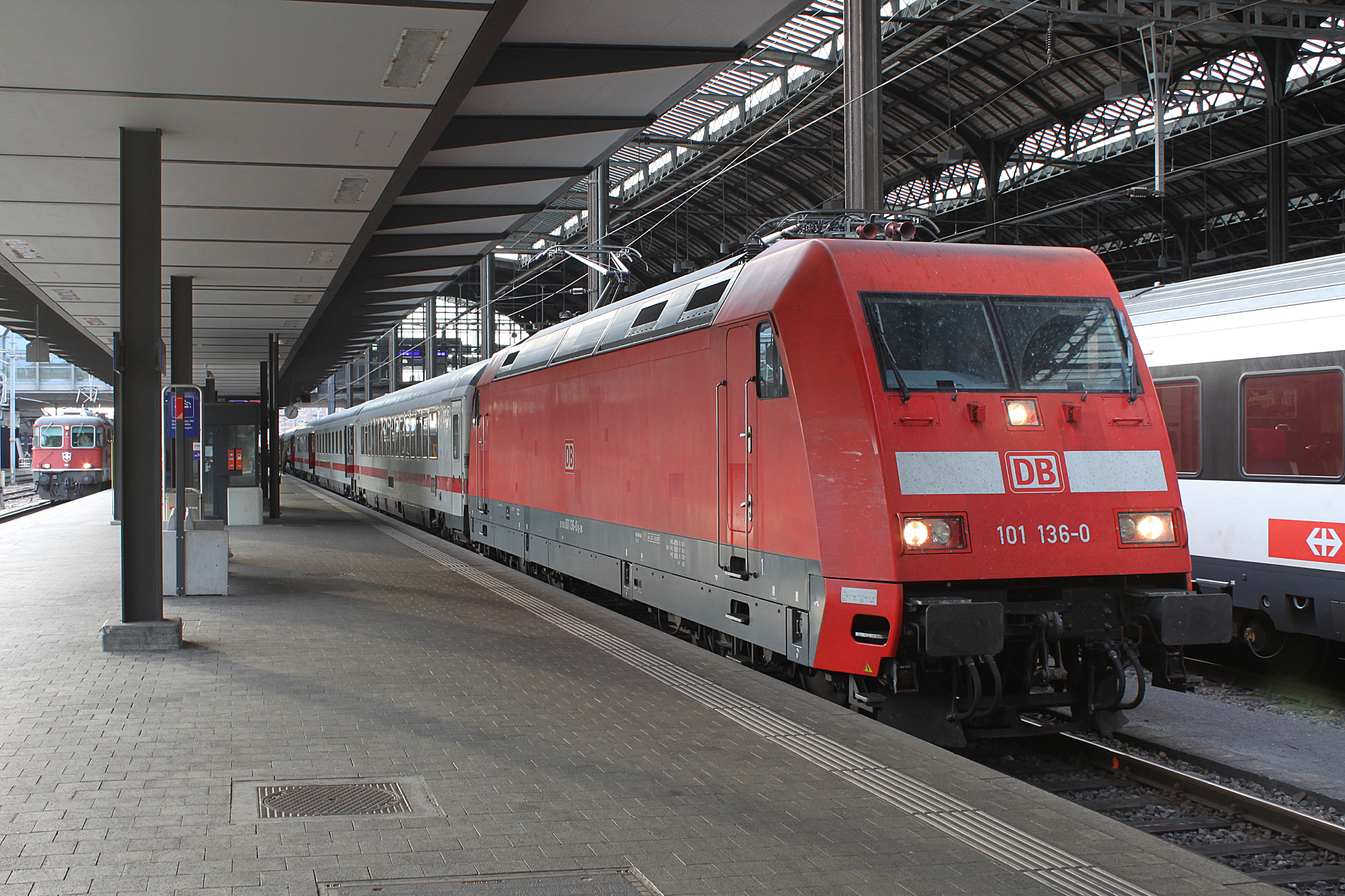
SBB Re 420 (only certified in Switzerland) and DB Class 101 (only certified in Germany) at the Basel SBB station.

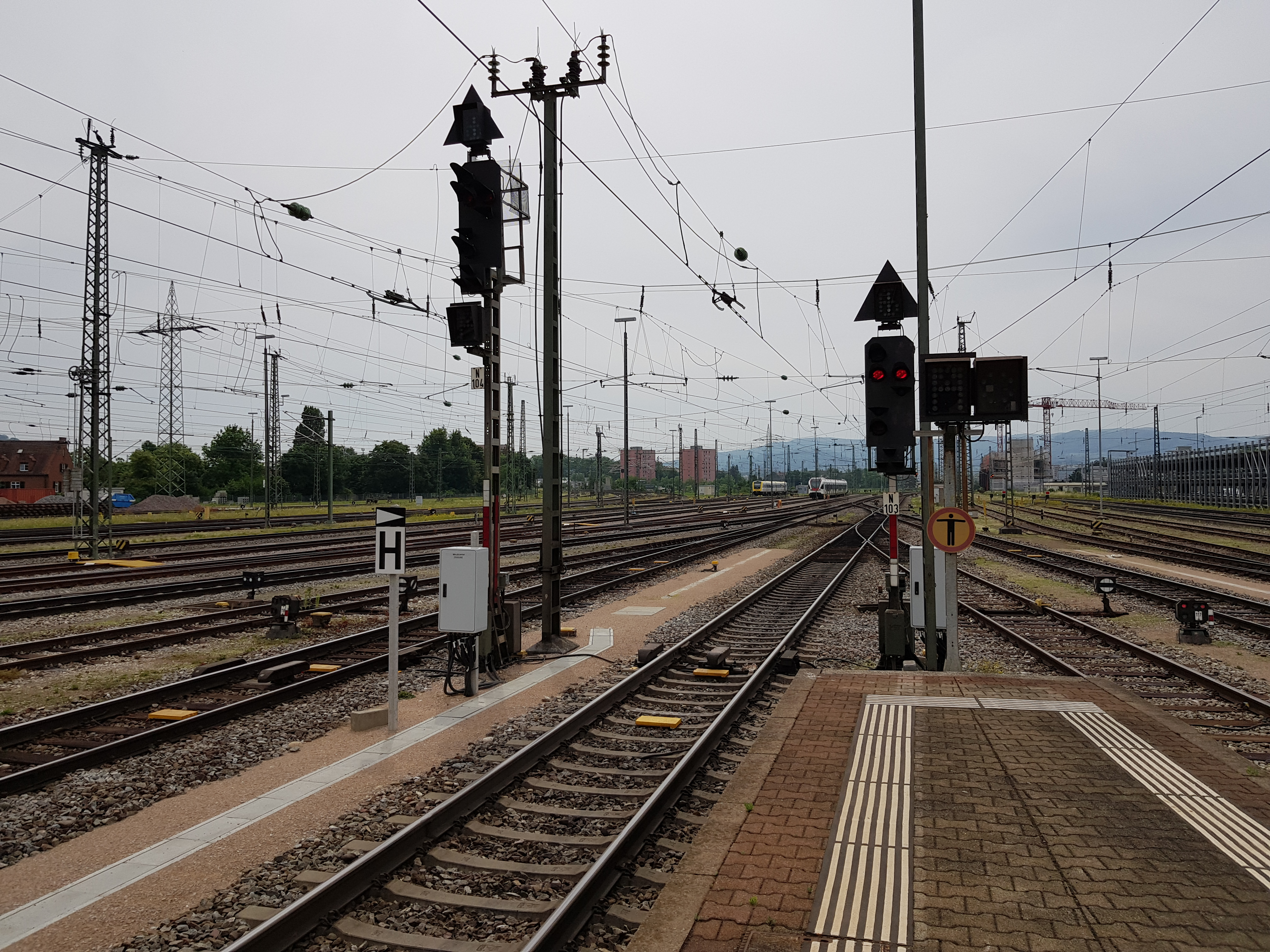
Block signaling point N103 on the Basel Bad Bf - Basel SBB route that integrated with PZB 90 magnets on the right sides of the track, two yellow EuroBalises (ETCS L1 LS) and two Integra-Signum magnets.

The track section from Basel SBB station (BS) via Basel Bad station (RB) to Weil am Rhein station (RW) in Germany is designed under SBB I standard and integrated with three different train protection systems: ETCS Level 1 LS (European), PZB 90 (German) and EuroSIGNUM/EuroZUB (Swiss). The overhead catenaries are also compatible with both the Swiss 1450mm and the German 1950mm pantograph types. This enables rolling-stocks holding the Swiss or German operation certificate to connect the nearby regions and doesn’t require additional multi-system capability.

== Connections ==
=== Overview ===
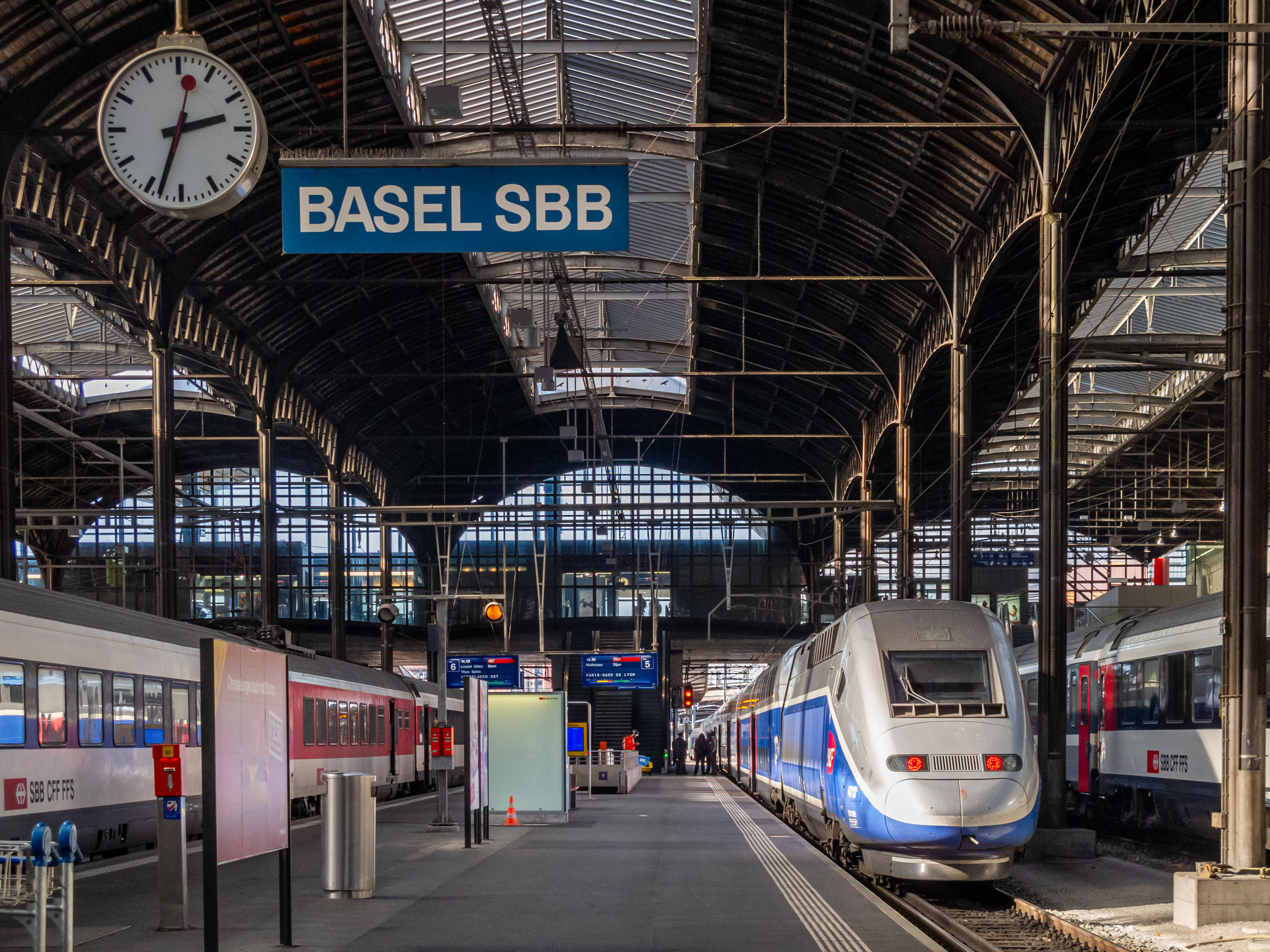
SBB and SNCF trains

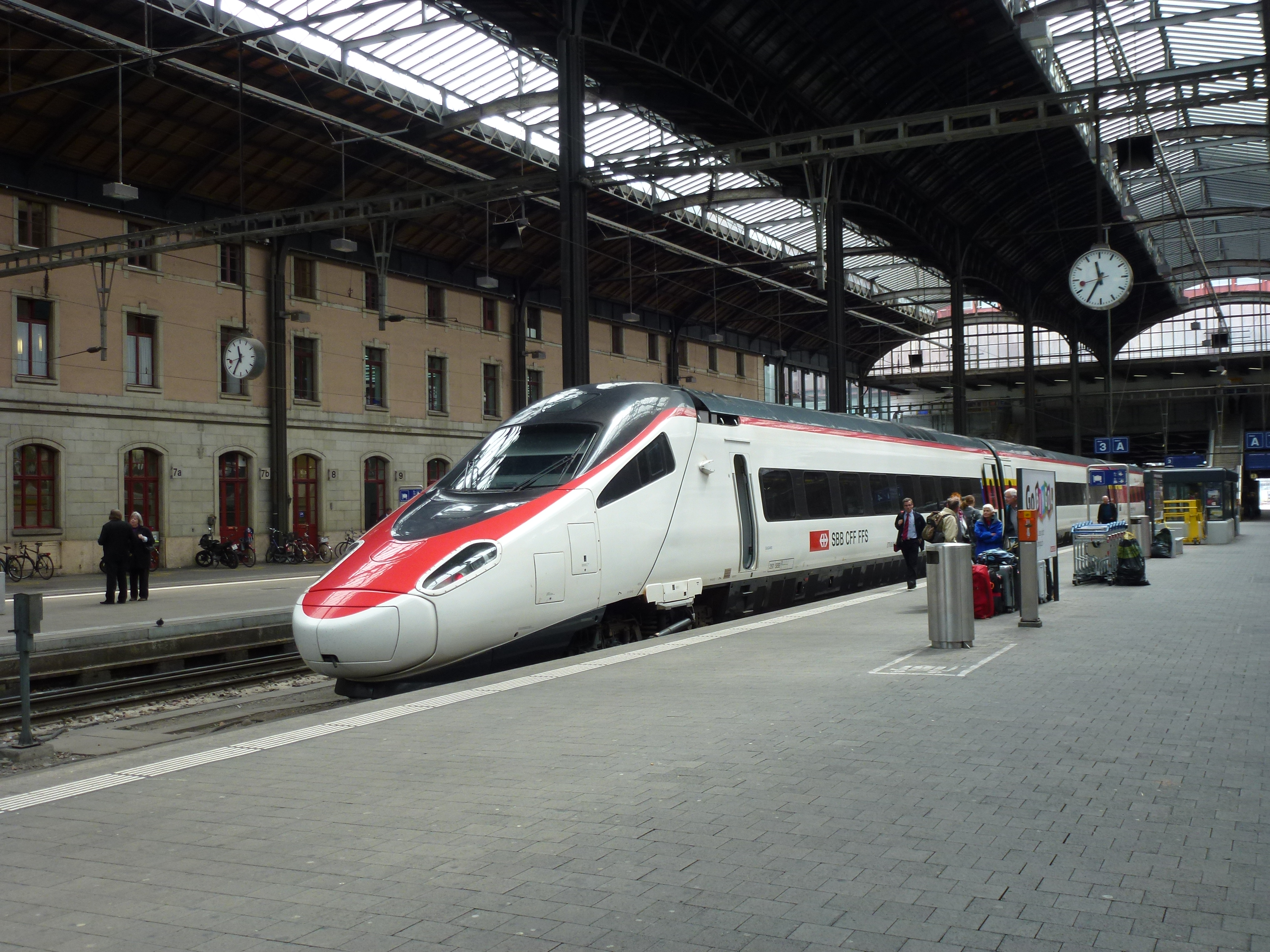
A train awaits departure for Italy.

About 1,000 trains depart from the station daily. Nearly every 90 seconds, a passenger train leaves or stops at the station. Additionally, freight trains still use the through tracks, and post office trains enter and exit the underground postal station.

=== International long-distance trains ===
An ICE departs from Basel SBB every hour to Berlin or Hamburg and a number of other German cities. There is also a daily ICE International connection to Amsterdam. Several times a day, EuroCitys run to Milan, and TGVs to Paris. Night connections exist with Berlin, and Hamburg. There used to be a direct connection to Moscow but as of 2014 this has been discontinued.

=== National long-distance trains ===
Several times hourly, InterCity trains run to Zürich HB, Bern and Olten. At least hourly, Zürich–Chur, Olten–Lucerne–Bellinzona–Lugano, Olten–Bern–Interlaken/Visp–Brig, and Delémont–Biel/Bienne–Neuchâtel–Lausanne/Geneva can be reached.

=== Trinational regional trains ===
As a border station, Basel SBB is also aligned with regional services to Germany, France, and Switzerland. The Basel Regional S-Bahn network ranges from Frick/Laufenburg in the east, Olten in the south, and Porrentruy in the west to Mulhouse in the north west and Zell im Wiesental in the north east.

== Services ==
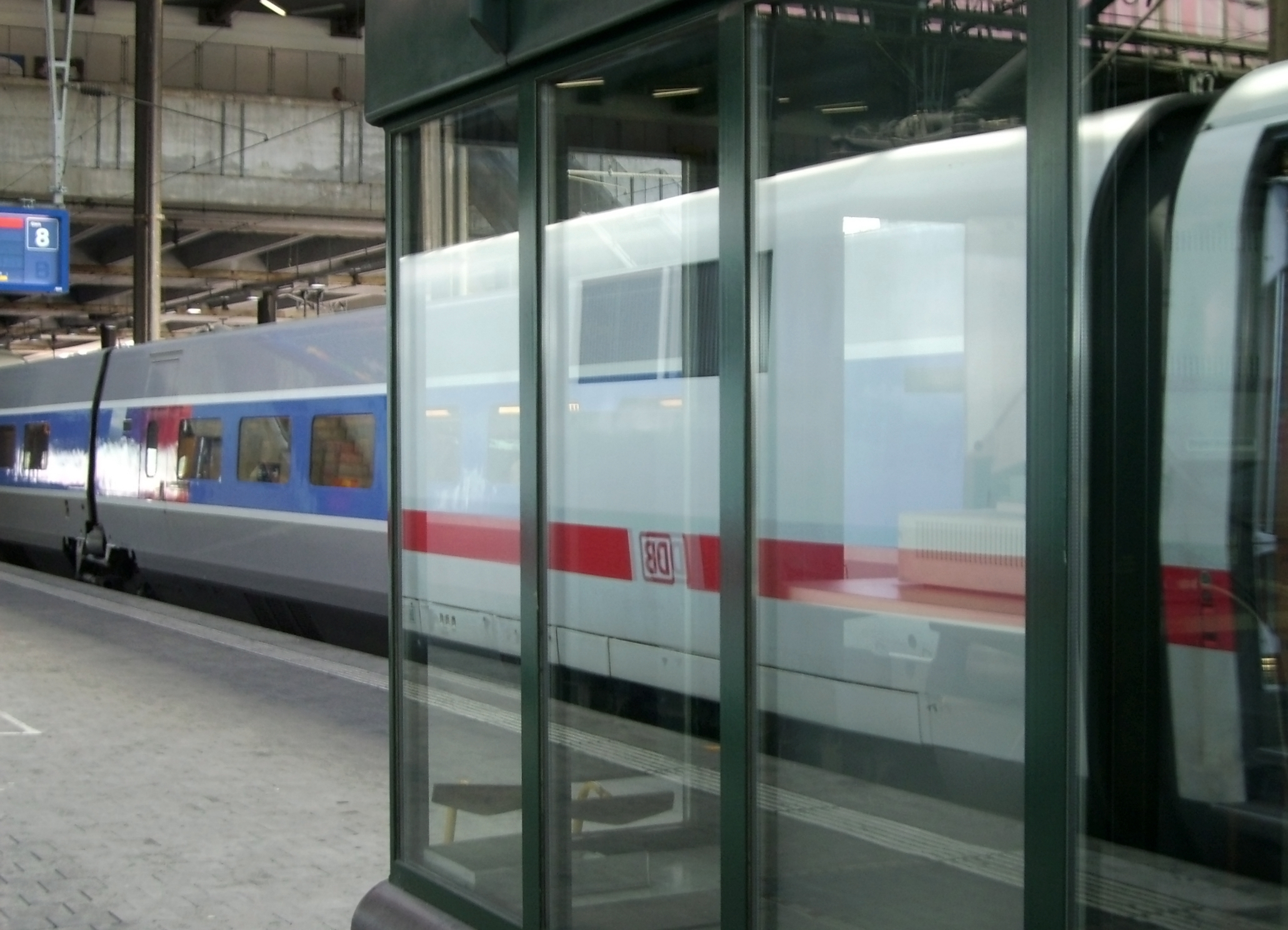
A TGV meets a reflection of an ICE.

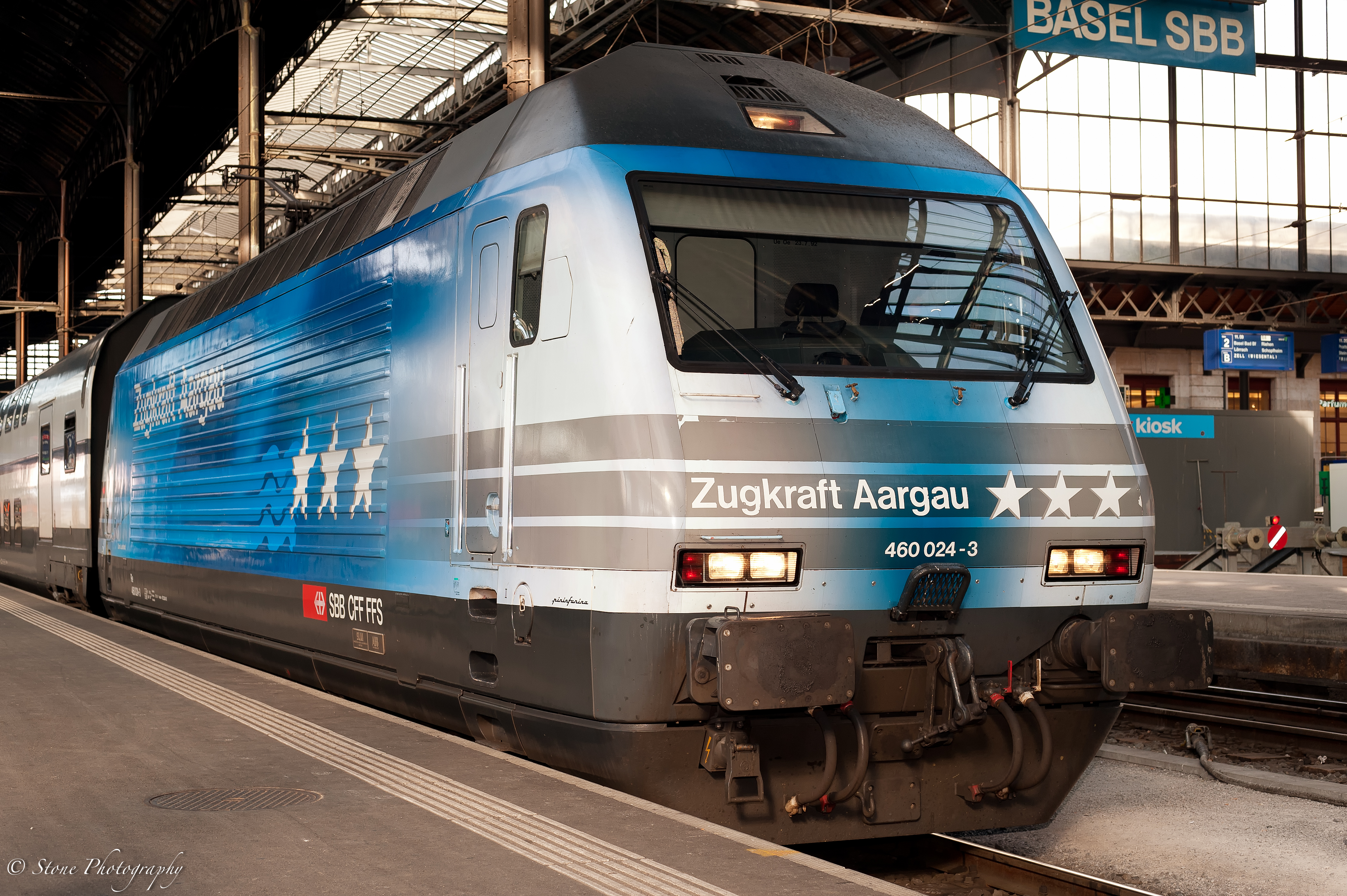
An Re 460 awaits departure with a domestic long-distance train.

As of the December 2025 timetable change, the following services stop at Basel SBB:

- TGV Lyria / InterCity: half-hourly service to Zürich Hauptbahnhof, service every two hours or better to Chur, and every two hours to Paris-Lyon.
- Intercity Express:
  - service every two hours to Cologne Hauptbahnhof.
  - two round-trips per day between Hamburg-Altona and Chur.
- EuroCity / InterCity / ICE: half-hourly service to Spiez. Most northbound trains terminate in Basel; a single EuroCity continues to Hamburg-Altona, another to Frankfurt (Main) Hauptbahnhof, and two ICEs continue to Berlin Ostbahnhof. Most southbound trains continue to Interlaken Ost; one train every two hours continues to Brig. Four EuroCity trains continue from Brig to Milano Centrale.
- EuroCity / InterCity / InterRegio: hourly service to Bellinzona and every two hours to Locarno or Lugano; two trains per day continue from Lugano to Milano Centrale.
- Nightjet: overnight service between
  - Zürich Hauptbahnhof to Hamburg Hauptbahnhof
  - Zürich Hauptbahnhof to Berlin Hauptbahnhof and Prague
  - Zürich Hauptbahnhof and Basel to Amsterdam Centraal
- InterCity / InterRegio:
  - half-hourly service to Biel/Bienne and hourly service to Lausanne.
- InterRegio:
  - three trains per hour to Zürich Hauptbahnhof and hourly service to Zürich Airport.
  - hourly service to Lucerne.
- Transport express régional (TER): half-hourly service to Strasbourg-Ville and Mulhouse-Ville in addition to some omnibus trains to Mulhouse-Ville.
- Basel trinational S-Bahn:
  - /: half-hourly or better service to Stein-Säckingen and hourly service from there to Frick or Laufenburg.
  - /: half-hourly or better service to Laufen and two trains per day to Delémont.
  - /: service every fifteen minutes to Liestal and half-hourly or better service to Olten with additional peak-hour service to Sissach.
  - : half-hourly service to Zell (Wiesental).

As of mid-2025, SBB were planning to re-introduce night train service from Basel SBB towards Copenhagen and Malmö Central, following the route of the previous Aurora CityNightLine service withdrawn in 2014.

=== Trams ===
- 1: Dreirosenbrücke – Bahnhof St. Johann Basel – Kannenfeldplatz – Schützenhaus – Bahnhof SBB/SNCF (– Kunstmuseum – Messeplatz – Bad. Bahnhof Basel)
- 2: Binningen Kronenplatz – Margarethen – Bahnhof SBB/SNCF – Kunstmuseum – Messeplatz – Bad. Bahnhof Basel – Eglisee (– Riehen)
- 8: Neuweilerstrasse – Schützenhaus – Bahnhof SBB/SNCF – Aeschenplatz – Barfüsserplatz – Schifflände – Claraplatz – Feldbergstrasse – Kleinhüningen – Weil am Rhein (D)
- 10: Dornach Bahnhof – Arlesheim Dorf – Münchenstein Dorf – Neue Welt – Dreispitz – Bahnhof SBB/SNCF – Aeschenplatz – Theater – Zoo – Binningen Schloss – Bottmingen – Therwil – Ettingen – Witterswil – Bättwil – Flüh (– Leymen (F) – Rodersdorf) (longest tramway line of Europe)
- 11: Aesch Dorf – Reinach Dorf – Gartenstadt Münchenstein – Dreispitz – Bahnhof SBB/SNCF – Aeschenplatz – Barfüsserplatz – Schifflände – Volteplatz – St. Louis Grenze
- 16: Bruderholz – Jakobsberg – Heiliggeistkirche – Bahnhof SBB/SNCF Bahnhofeingang Gundeldingen – Heuwaage – Barfüsserplatz – Schifflände

=== Buses ===
Buses at Basel SBB serve the station on Centralbahnhofstrasse:

- 30 Bahnhof SBB/SNCF – Spalentor – UKBB – Feldbergstrasse – Bad. Bahnhof Basel (– Wettsteinallee – Tinguely Museum – Hoffmann La Roche – Wettsteinallee – Bad. Bahnhof Basel)
- 42 Bahnhof SBB/SNCF – Tinguely Museum – (Hoffmann La Roche –) Wettsteinallee – Bahnhof Niederholz – Bettingen Dorf
- 48 Bahnhof SBB/SNCF – Schützenhaus – Gartenstrasse– Bachgraben
- 50 Bahnhof SBB/SNCF – Brausebad – Kannenfeldplatz – EuroAirport

== In popular culture ==
The station entrance and a platform is seen in the film The Cassandra Crossing (1976) which passes as the "Geneva railway station".

== See also ==
- History of rail transport in Switzerland
- Rail transport in Switzerland
