= Laufenburg railway station (Switzerland) =

Railway station in the canton of Aargau on the High Rhine

Laufenburg
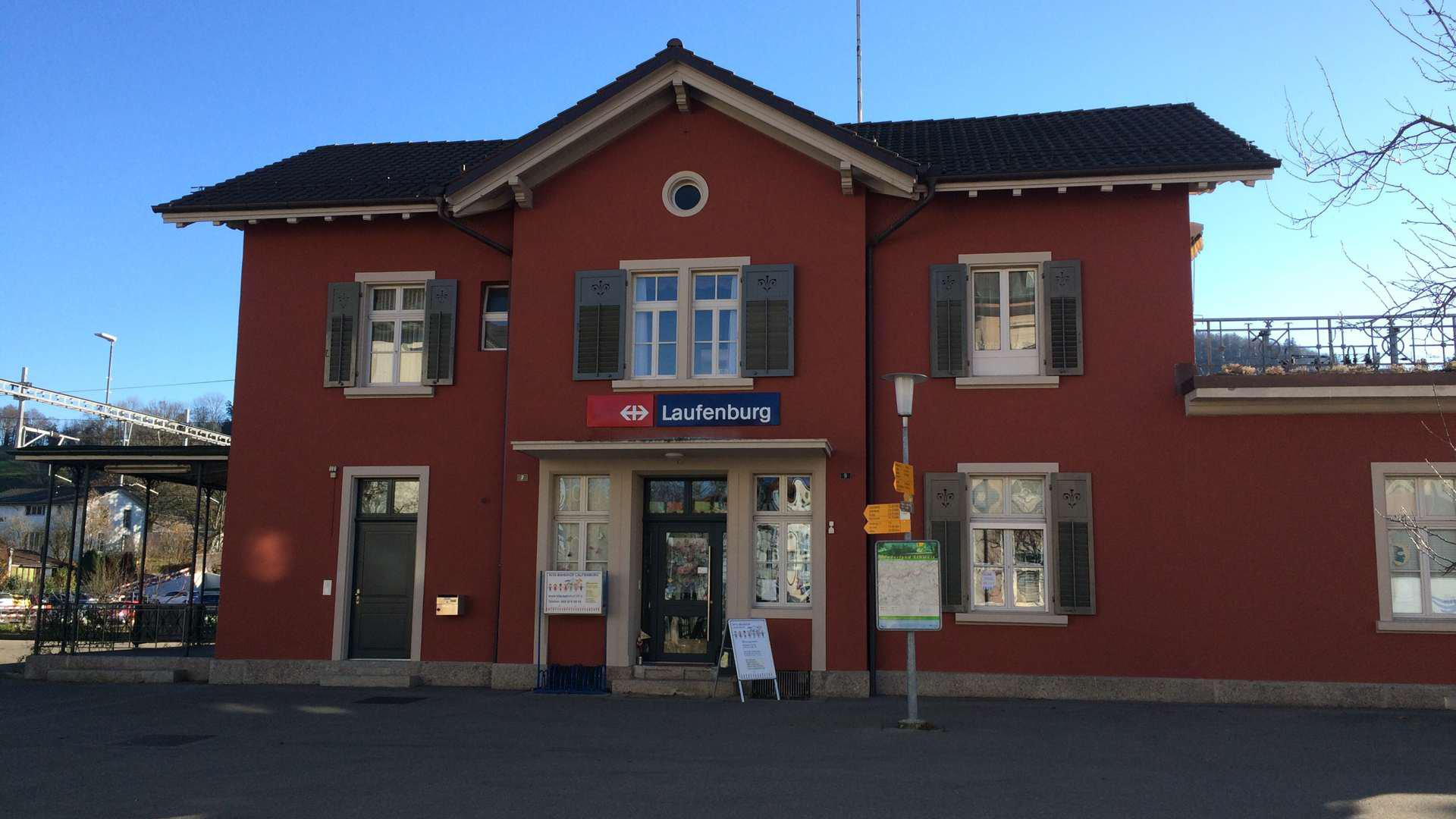
- The station building in 2016

General information
- Location: Laufenburg; Switzerland
- Coordinates: 47°33′34.09″N 8°3′39.92″E
- Owner: Swiss Federal Railways
- Line: Koblenz–Stein-Säckingen line
- Train operators: Swiss Federal Railways

Services
Preceding station	Basel S-Bahn	Following station
Stein-Säckingen towards Basel SBB	S1	Terminus
Location
- Location within Switzerland

Laufenburg railway station (German: Bahnhof Laufenburg) is a railway station in the municipality of Laufenburg, in the Swiss canton of Aargau. It is the easternmost passenger stop on the Koblenz–Stein-Säckingen line; between here and Koblenz the line is freight-only. The station is served by local trains only.

== Services ==
Laufenburg is served by the S1 the Basel S-Bahn:

- S1: hourly service to Basel SBB.
