= Basel S-Bahn =

Swiss-French-German trinational urban rail network

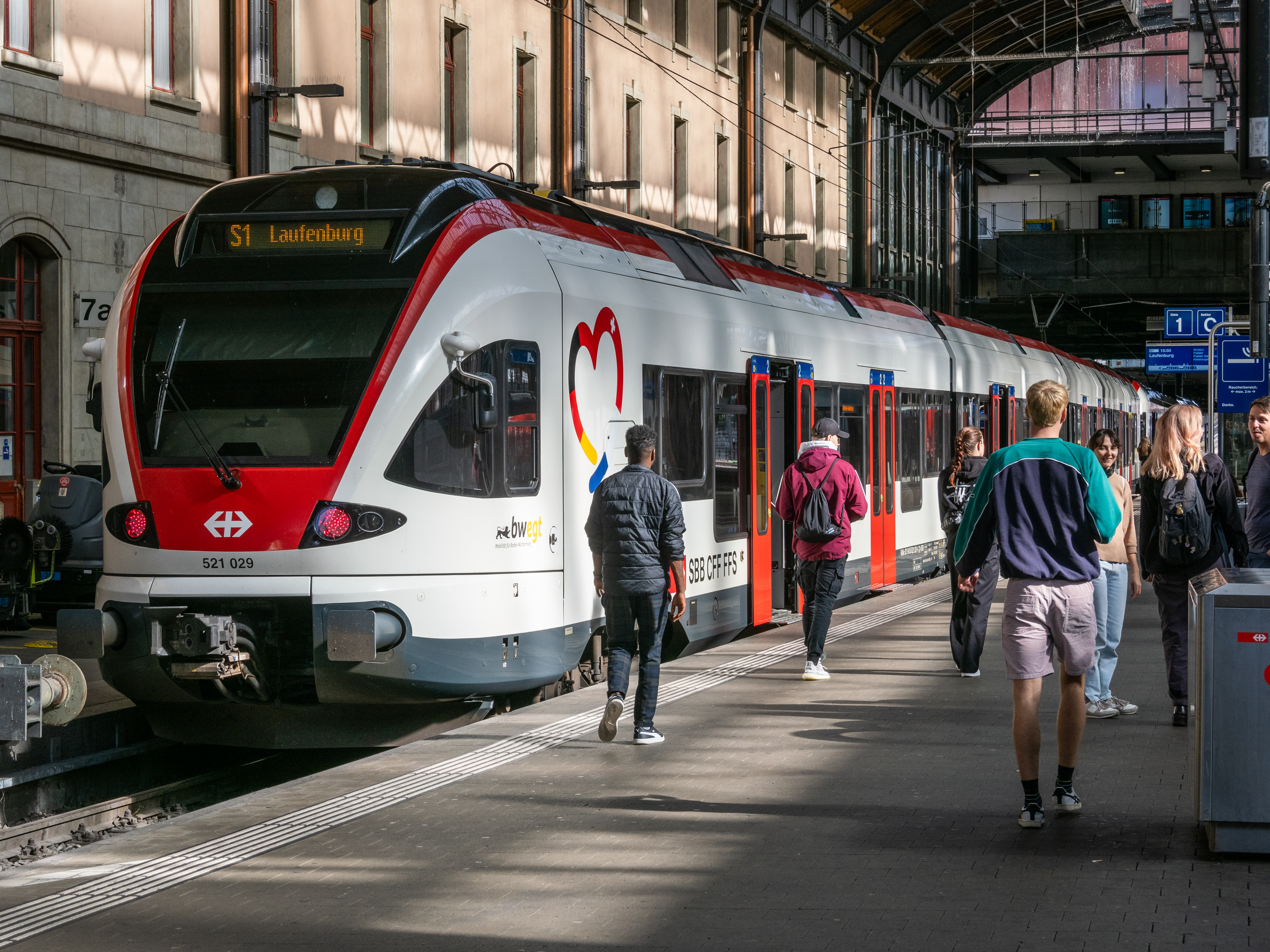
- S-Bahn train at Basel SBB

Overview
- Native name: German: Trinationale S-Bahn Basel, French: RER trinational de Bâle
- Owner: SBB CFF FFS, SBB GmbH, DB, SNCF Mobilités
- Area served: Swiss cantons of Basel-City, Basel-Country, Aargau, Solothurn, Jura, German state of Baden-Württemberg, and the French region of Grand Est
- Locale: Basel metropolitan area
- Transit type: S-Bahn
- Number of stations: 108
- Annual ridership: 47 million (2019)
- Headquarters: Basel, Switzerland
- Website: www.trireno.org

Operation
- Began operation: 1997; 29 years ago
- Operators: SBB CFF FFS, DB Regio, TER Grand Est
- Character: At-grade

Technical
- System length: 357 km (222 mi)
- Track gauge: 1,435 mm (4 ft 8 1/2 in)

The Basel S-Bahn (German: Trinationale S-Bahn Basel, French: RER trinational de Bâle) has provided an S-Bahn-style rail service connecting the Basel metropolitan area since 1997 in Switzerland, Germany and France. It consists of eight suburban train lines, including four that operate across borders.

The S-Bahn is operated by the Swiss Federal Railways (SBB CFF FFS), its German subsidiary SBB GmbH, the German DB, and the French SNCF Voyageurs. The responsible transport authorities are the Swiss cantons of Basel-City, Basel-Country, Aargau, Solothurn; the German state of Baden-Württemberg and the French region of Grand Est. Since 2018, they coordinate under the name trireno the future extension of the S-Bahn.

The services connect with those of Aargau S-Bahn, Breisgau S-Bahn, Zurich S-Bahn and other regional train services (DB Regio Baden-Württemberg, TER Grand Est).

== Operations ==
Due to various factors, the service frequency of the five suburban train lines is not the same. Lines S1 (between Basel SBB and Stein-Säckingen) and S3 (between Olten and Laufen) with a large patronage run every half hour. Lines with medium ridership (TER, RB30, RB27, S5 and S6) operate every half hour during peak hours and generally at hourly intervals during off-peak hours and on weekends. Lines with low ridership (S1 between Stein-Säckingen and Laufenburg/Frick, S3 between Laufen and Porrentruy and S9) operate at hourly intervals. Due to operating in three countries, this pattern of operations is not only determined by demand, but also by the various national and local governments involved.

Two S-Bahn services operate on each of the lines between Basel SBB and Pratteln and between Lörrach-Stetten and Steinen, resulting in a 15 minute frequency on these lines. During peak hours additional services operate.

=== Lines ===
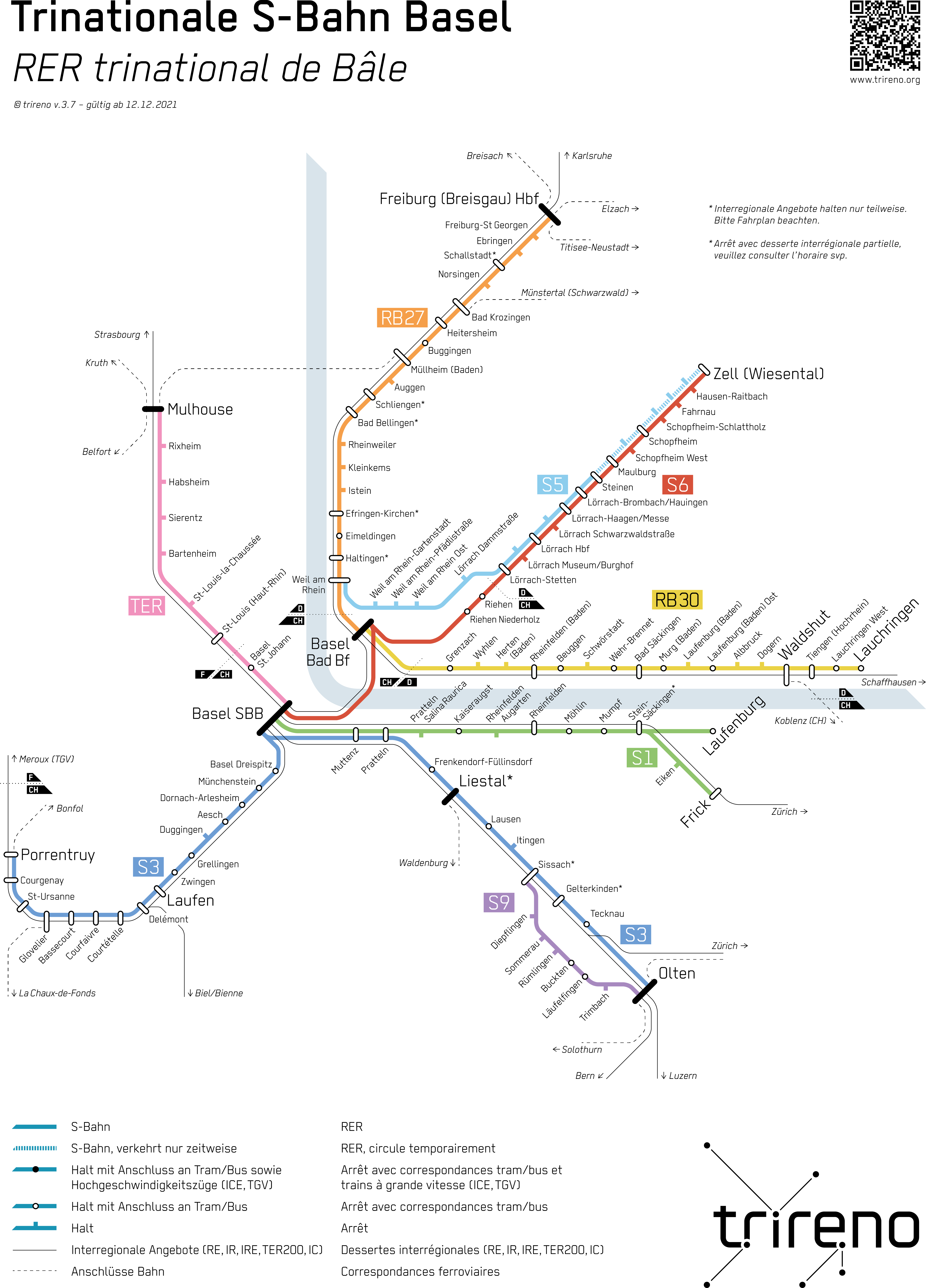
The network in 2020

As of the December 2025 timetable change, the following lines operate:

- S1: Basel SBB – Rheinfelden – Stein-Säckingen – Frick / Laufenburg
- S3: Laufen – Basel SBB – Liestal – Sissach – Olten
- S5: Weil am Rhein – Lörrach Hbf – Steinen (– Schopfheim – Zell (Wiesental))
- S6: Basel SBB – Basel Bad Bf – Riehen – Lörrach Hbf – Steinen – Schopfheim – Zell (Wiesental)
- S9: Sissach – Läufelfingen – Olten
- S11: Basel SBB – Stein-Säckingen
- S31: Basel SBB – Laufen
- S33: Basel SBB – Liestal (– Sissach)
- TER: Mulhouse – Basel SBB
- RB27: Basel SBB – Müllheim (Baden) – Freiburg (Breisgau) Hbf
- RB30: Basel Bad Bf – Rheinfelden (Baden) – Bad Säckingen – Laufenburg (Baden) – Waldshut – Lauchringen

Lines S1, S3, S9, S11, S31 and S33 are operated by Swiss Federal Railways (SBB) and serve Switzerland only. Until the opening of the RER Jura with the 2025 timetable change, the S3 continued from Laufen to Porrentruy.

Lines S5 and S6 are operated by SBB GmbH, SBB's German subsidiary, the former serving Germany only and the latter going between Switzerland and Germany.

Line RB27 and RB30 are operated by DB Regio, the commuter rail arm of Deutsche Bahn, and both serve Switzerland and Germany. (RB stands for Regionalbahn, German for "regional rail".)

Line TER is operated by SNCF Voyageurs, the regional rail arm of French state railway company SNCF, and runs between Switzerland and France as part of the TER Grand Est network. (TER stands for Transport express régional.)

The 357 kilometres (222 mi)-long railway network currently includes 108 stations and stops, of which 47 are in Switzerland, 54 in Germany and 7 are in France. The shortest line is the S5 (14 km / 8.7 mi) and the longest line is S3 (106 km / 66 mi).

== Fare networks ==
The trireno is operating in the integrated fare networks TriRegio (twn, RVL, distribus, SNCF TER), twn, RVF, RVL, and TER Grand Est.

== Proposals ==
The Herzstück Basel project involves the planning and construction of a tunnel through Basel city centre, providing a more direct link between Basel Badische Bahnhof and Basel SBB via two new underground stations, "Basel Mitte" and "Basel Klybeck".
