= Bözberg railway line =

Railway line in Switzerland

Bözberg
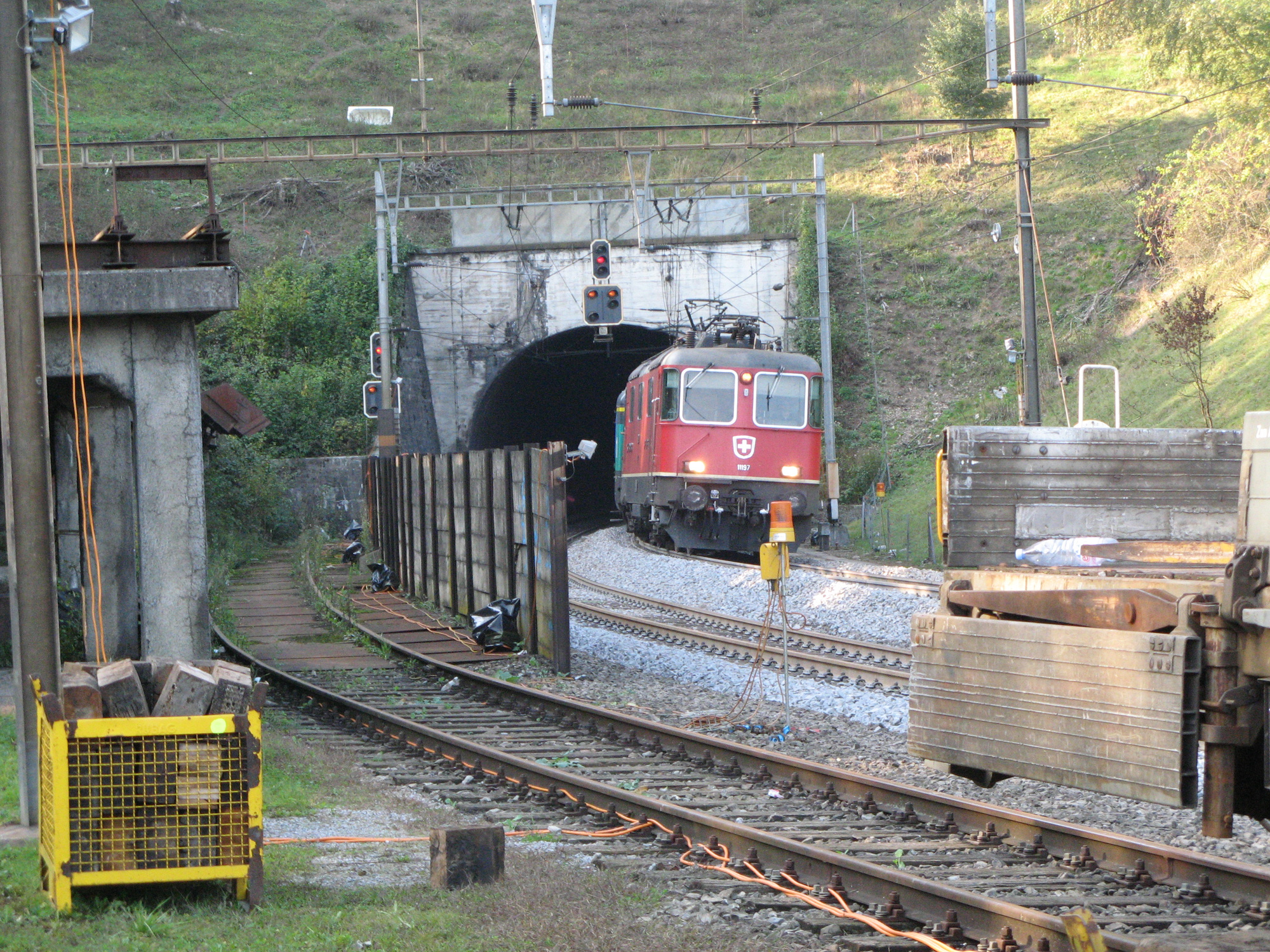
- South portal of the Bözberg Tunnel at the ghost station of Schinznach-Dorf

Overview
- Native name: Bözbergstrecke
- Line number: 700
- Locale: Switzerland
- Termini: Basel SBB; Baden

Technical
- Line length: 65.9 km (40.9 mi)
- Number of tracks: 2
- Track gauge: 1,435 mm (4 ft 8 1/2 in)
- Electrification: 15 kV/16.7 Hz AC overhead catenary
- Maximum incline: 1.4%

The Bözberg railway line is a railway line in Switzerland, running between Basel and Brugg via Pratteln, Rheinfelden, Stein-Säckingen, Frick and the Bözberg Tunnel. At Brugg it connects to Zürich via Baden and to the Gotthard Railway via the Aargauische Südbahn.

The line was built by the Bötzberg Railway (German: Bötzbergbahn), a joint venture of the Swiss Northeastern Railway and Swiss Central Railway. Construction started in 1870 and it opened on 2 August 1875. It was taken over by Swiss Federal Railways in 1902. It is now an important freight line connecting Germany and Italy via the Gotthard.

== History ==
A proposal was made in 1836 to build a railway line from Zürich to Basel via Laufenburg but it suffered from lack of finance and opposition in Basel. The section between Zürich and Baden opened on 9 August 1847 by the Swiss Northern Railway (German: Schweizerische Nordbahn), which became known as the Spanisch-Brötli bahn ("Spanish bun railway"). The Aargau canton government proposed a continuation of the line via Brugg and the Bözberg Pass to Basel.

In 1858 the Swiss Northeastern Railway opened a line from Brugg to Olten, connecting to the Swiss Central Railway's Hauenstein line to Basel. At the same time the Zürich–Baden line (which by that time had been merged into the Schweizerische Nordostbahn) was extended to connect with the Centralbahn's line at Brugg. Construction of an alternative route, known as the Bötzbergbahn (BöB) began in 1870 and it was opened on 2 August 1875 through the Bözberg Pass from Pratteln to Brugg via the Frick valley and the 2,526-metre-long Bözberg Tunnel by a joint venture of the Centralbahn and the Nordostbahn. This line is 49 km long, about 8 kilometers shorter than the line via Olten. Trains on it used the Centralbahn between Basel and Pratteln and the Nordostbahn between Brugg and Zürich. The single-track line was built with a maximum grade of 1.4%.

In 1895, the section between Pratteln and Stein-Säckingen was double-tracked. No further double-tracking occurred before the Bözbergbahn was incorporated in the Swiss Federal Railways on 1 January 1902. In November 1904, the section from Stein-Säckingen to Frick was double-tracked. In April 1905, this was followed by the double-tracking of the Schinznach-Dorf–Brugg section, and finally in September 1905 double-tracking was completed on the section from Schinznach-Dorf through the tunnel to Effingen and Frick.

On 18 October 1926, the entire line from Pratteln to Brugg was electrified. Between Basel and Pratteln the Bözberg and Hauenstein lines share the same track. Congestion on this section was relieved by the opening of Adler Tunnel in 2003 between Liestal and Muttenz, which is now used by fast passenger trains.

== Operation ==
=== Passenger services ===
General two inter-regional trains operate each way each hour between Zürich and Basel. One Regio S-Bahn Basel S1 service operates each way each hour between Frick and Basel, stopping at all stations. Intercity trains between Zürich and Basel operate on the faster route via the Heitersberg line, the Olten–Aarau line (but bypassing Olten) and the Hauenstein line.

In 1993, the local rail services between Brugg and Frick closed, and public transport on the route is now only provided by PostBus Aargau line 137 bus service. The stations at Hornussen, Effingen and Schinznach Dorf are no longer served by trains and the Villnachern station is served only two trains a day of Regio S-Bahn Basel.

=== Freight services ===
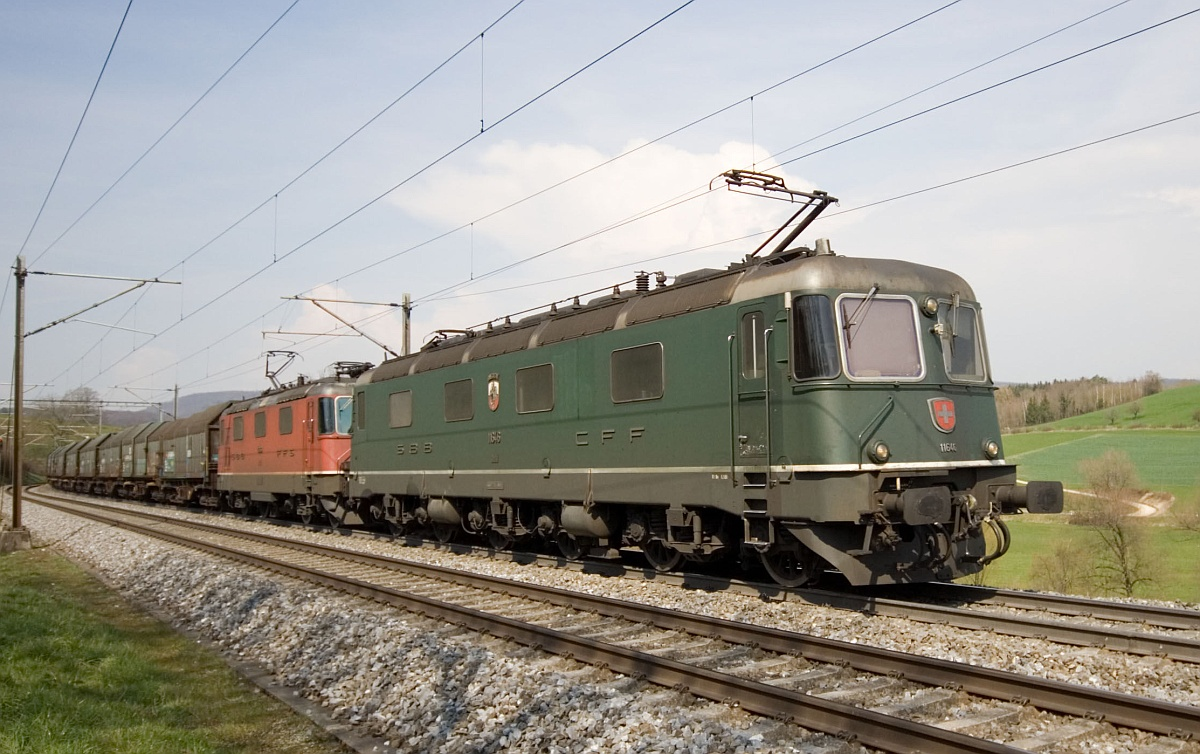
Coupled Re 420 (red) and Re 620 (green) locomotives on the northern approach to the Bözberg tunnel

Freight trains operate every day over the line to connect with the Gotthard line. They are mostly hauled by two of the most modern freight locomotives of various railway companies or hauled by one Swiss Federal railways Re 420 (formerly Re 4/4 II) paired with a Re 620 (formerly Re 6/6 II)—this combination is known as Re 10/10.

== Future developments ==
The Swiss Federal Office of Transport has granted a permit for the construction of a replacement for the Bözberg railway tunnel. The new tunnel will form part of a scheme to increase the loading gauge on the freight route between Basel and Chiasso via the new Gotthard Base Tunnel.
