= Gelterkinden railway station =

Railway station in Switzerland

Gelterkinden
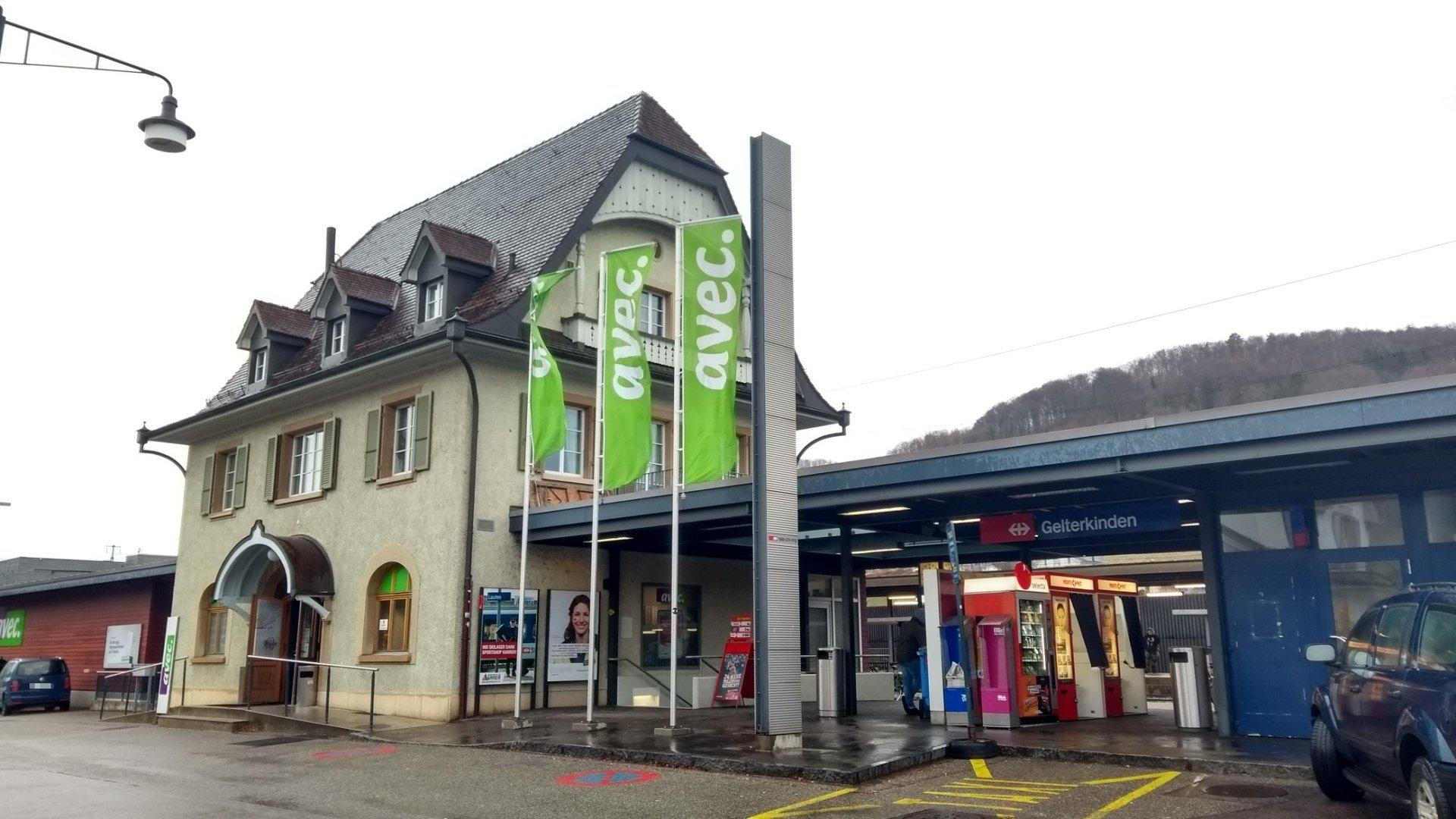
- The station in 2018

General information
- Location: Gelterkinden; Switzerland
- Coordinates: 47°27′57″N 7°50′52″E
- Elevation: 402 m (1,319 ft)
- Owner: Swiss Federal Railways
- Line: Hauenstein line
- Distance: 24.1 km (15.0 mi) from Basel SBB
- Train operators: Swiss Federal Railways
- Connections: Baselland Transport bus lines

Other information
- Fare zone: 32 (tnw)

Passengers
- 2018: 5,600 per weekday

Services
Preceding station	SBB CFF FFS	Following station
Sissach towards Basel SBB	IR 27	Olten towards Lucerne
Sissach towards Basel SBB	IR 37	Aarau towards Zürich HB
Preceding station	Basel S-Bahn	Following station
Sissach towards Delémont	S3	Tecknau towards Olten
Location

Gelterkinden railway station (German: Bahnhof Gelterkinden) is a railway station in the municipality of Gelterkinden, in the Swiss canton of Basel-Landschaft. It is an intermediate stop on the base tunnel branch of the standard gauge Hauenstein line of Swiss Federal Railways.

== Services ==
As of the December 2025 timetable change, the following services stop at Gelterkinden:

- InterRegio:
  - hourly service between Basel SBB and Lucerne.
  - hourly service between Basel SBB and Zürich Hauptbahnhof.
- Basel trinational S-Bahn: half-hourly service between Laufen and Olten; and two trains per day to Delémont.
