= Trimbach railway station =

Railway station in Switzerland

Trimbach
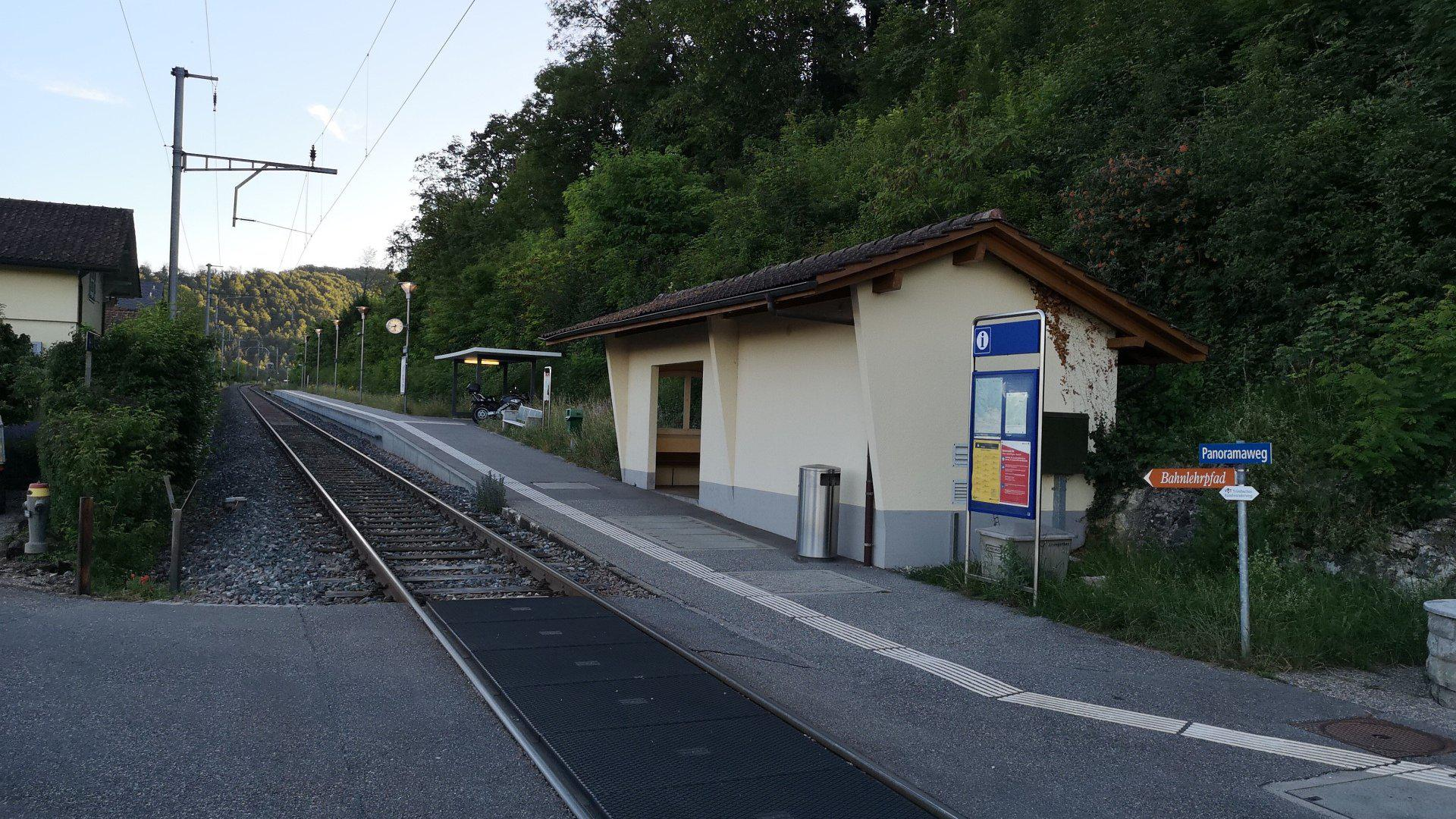
- The station in 2018

General information
- Location: Trimbach; Switzerland
- Coordinates: 47°21′57.67″N 7°54′15.59″E
- Owner: Swiss Federal Railways
- Line: Hauenstein line
- Train operators: Swiss Federal Railways

Services
Preceding station	Basel S-Bahn	Following station
Läufelfingen towards Sissach	S9	Olten Terminus
Location
- Location within Switzerland

Trimbach railway station (German: Bahnhof Trimbach) is a railway station in the municipality of Trimbach, in the Swiss canton of Solothurn. It is an intermediate stop on the summit branch of the Hauenstein line and is served by local trains only.

== Services ==
The following services stop at Trimbach:

- Basel S-Bahn S9: hourly service between Sissach and Olten.
