= Itingen railway station =

Railway station in Switzerland

Itingen
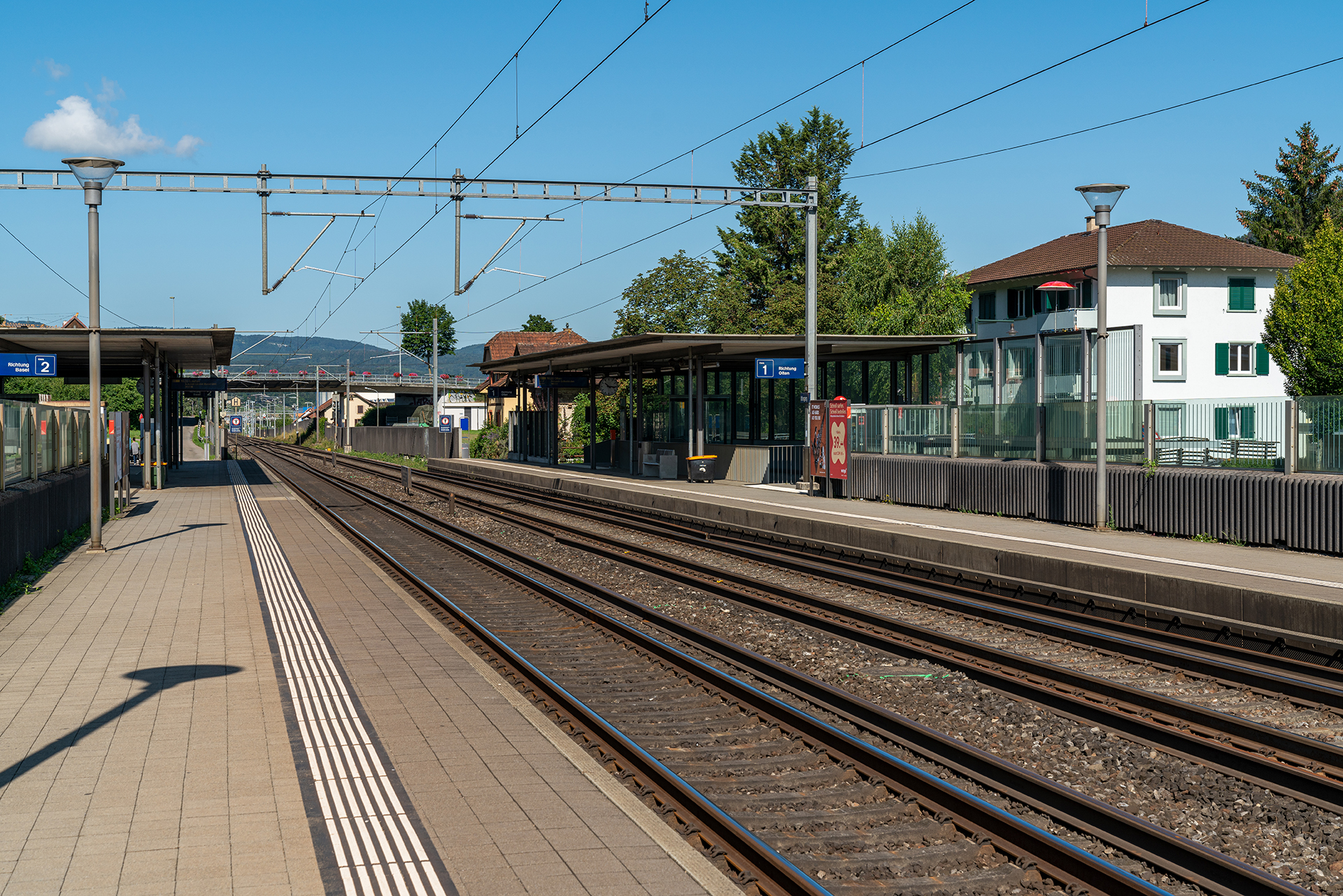
- The station in 2019

General information
- Location: Itingen; Switzerland
- Coordinates: 47°28′02″N 7°47′14″E
- Elevation: 358 m (1,175 ft)
- Owner: Swiss Federal Railways
- Line: Hauenstein line
- Distance: 19.2 km (11.9 mi) from Basel SBB
- Train operators: Swiss Federal Railways

Other information
- Fare zone: 28 (tnw)

Passengers
- 2018: 1,200 per weekday

Services
Preceding station	Basel S-Bahn	Following station
Lausen towards Delémont	S3	Sissach towards Olten
Liestal towards Basel SBB	S33	Sissach Terminus
Location

Itingen railway station (German: Bahnhof Itingen) is a railway station in the municipality of Itingen, in the Swiss canton of Basel-Landschaft. It is an intermediate stop on the standard gauge Hauenstein line of Swiss Federal Railways.

== Services ==
As of the December 2025 timetable change, the following services stop at Itingen:

- Basel trinational S-Bahn /: half-hourly service between Laufen and Olten with additional peak hour service to Sissach; and two trains per day to Delémont.
