= Lausen railway station =

Railway station in Switzerland

Lausen
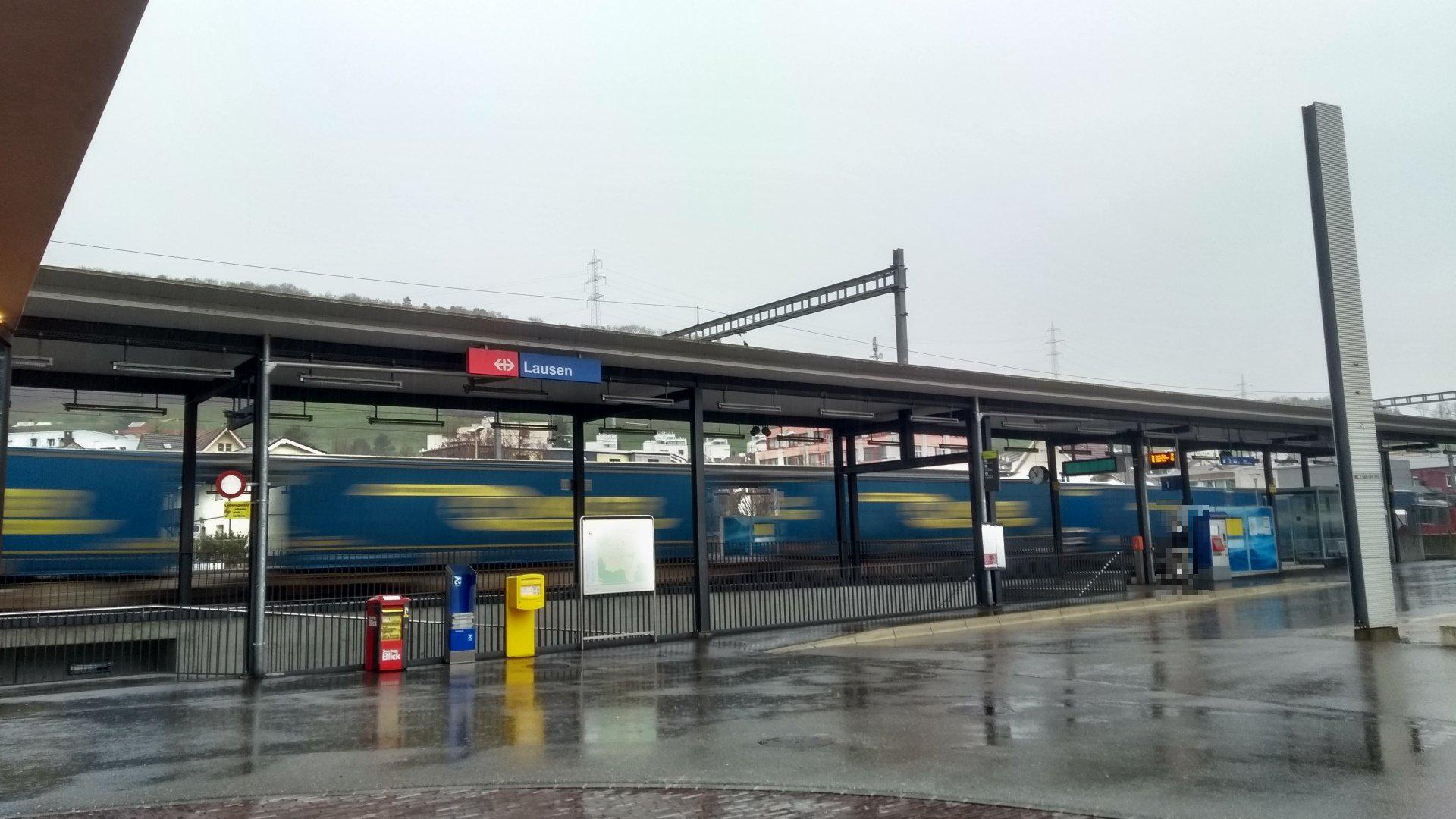
- The station in 2018

General information
- Location: Lausen; Switzerland
- Coordinates: 47°28′13″N 7°45′35″E
- Elevation: 343 m (1,125 ft)
- Owner: Swiss Federal Railways
- Line: Hauenstein line
- Distance: 17.1 km (10.6 mi) from Basel SBB
- Train operators: Swiss Federal Railways
- Connections: Baselland Transport and Autobus AG Liestal bus lines

Other information
- Fare zone: 28 (tnw)

Passengers
- 2018: 1,700 per weekday

Services
Preceding station	Basel S-Bahn	Following station
Liestal towards Delémont	S3	Itingen towards Olten
Location

Lausen railway station (German: Bahnhof Lausen) is a railway station in the municipality of Lausen, in the Swiss canton of Basel-Landschaft. It is an intermediate stop on the standard gauge Hauenstein line of Swiss Federal Railways.

== Services ==
As of the December 2025 timetable change, the following services stop at Lausen:

- Basel trinational S-Bahn: half-hourly service between Laufen and Olten; and two trains per day to Delémont.
