= Läufelfingen railway station =

Railway station in Switzerland

Läufelfingen
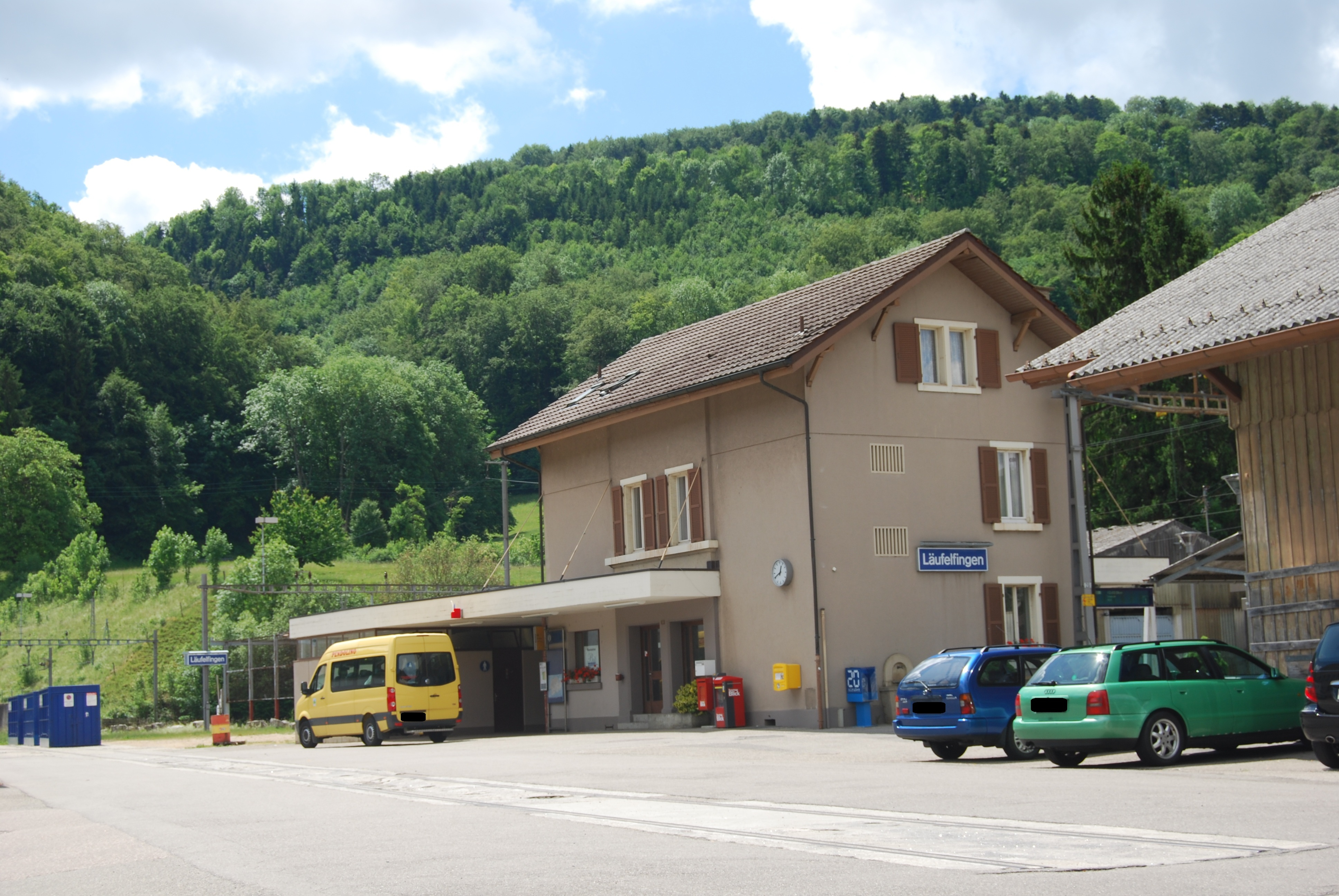
- The station in 2011

General information
- Location: Läufelfingen; Switzerland
- Coordinates: 47°23′31.42″N 7°51′22.90″E
- Owner: Swiss Federal Railways
- Line: Hauenstein line
- Train operators: Swiss Federal Railways

Services
Preceding station	Basel S-Bahn	Following station
Buckten towards Sissach	S9	Trimbach towards Olten
Location
- Location within Switzerland

Läufelfingen railway station (German: Bahnhof Läufelfingen) is a railway station in the municipality of Läufelfingen, in the Swiss canton of Basel-Landschaft. It is an intermediate stop on the summit branch of the Hauenstein line and is served by local trains only.

== Services ==
The following services stop at Läufelfingen:

- Basel S-Bahn S9: hourly service between Sissach and Olten.
