= Liestal railway station =

Railway station in Basel-Landschaft, Switzerland

Liestal
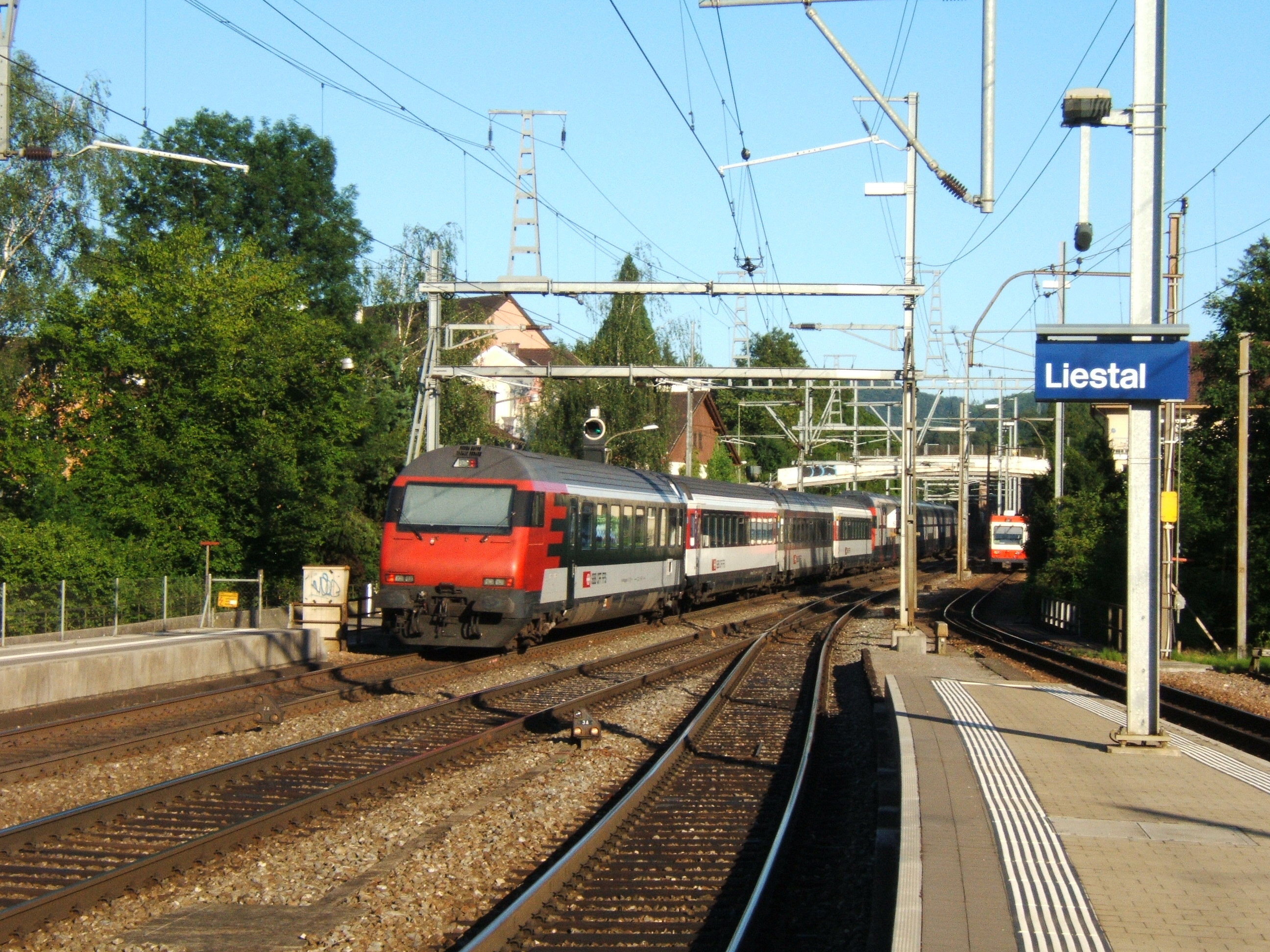
- Liestal station in 2006, prior to the rebuild, with main line to left and Waldenburg line to right

General information
- Location: Liestal; Switzerland
- Coordinates: 47°29′04″N 7°43′53″E
- Elevation: 327 m (1,073 ft)
- Owner: Swiss Federal Railways
- Lines: Hauenstein line; Waldenburg line
- Distance: 14.4 km (8.9 mi) from Basel SBB
- Platforms: 3
- Tracks: 6
- Train operators: Swiss Federal Railways; Baselland Transport
- Connections: PostAuto Schweiz and Autobus AG Liestal bus lines

Construction
- Architect: Burkard Meyer BSA (2019–2025), Alfred Ramseyer

Other information
- Fare zone: 20 (tnw)

Passengers
- 2025: 16,200 per day (SBB, SOB (excluding BLT))
- Rank: 51 out of 1,095

Services
Preceding station	SBB CFF FFS	Following station
Basel SBB towards Hamburg-Altona	EuroCity	Olten towards Interlaken Ost
Basel SBB Terminus	IC 61	Olten towards Interlaken Ost
Basel SBB Terminus	IC 6	Olten towards Brig
Basel SBB Terminus	IR 27	Sissach towards Lucerne
Basel SBB Terminus	IR 37	Sissach towards Zürich HB
Preceding station	DB Fernverkehr	Following station
Basel SBB towards Berlin Ostbahnhof	ICE 12	Olten towards Brig or Interlaken Ost
Preceding station	Basel S-Bahn	Following station
Frenkendorf-Füllinsdorf towards Delémont	S3	Lausen towards Olten
Frenkendorf-Füllinsdorf towards Basel SBB	S33	Itingen towards Sissach
Preceding station	Baselland Transport	Following station
Terminus	Line 19	Altmarkt towards Waldenburg
Location

Liestal railway station (German: Bahnhof Liestal) is a railway station in Switzerland, in the municipality of Liestal and canton of Basel-Landschaft. The station is on the Swiss Federal Railway's Hauenstein main line, which connects Basel and Olten. It is served by five trains per hour to Basel, four trains per hour to Olten, and hourly trains to Interlaken, Lucerne, and Zürich. Several trains a day operate through to Frankfurt and Berlin. The station is also the junction for, and terminus of, the Waldenburg narrow gauge railway, which operates a train service every ten or twenty minutes to Waldenburg. The Waldenburg line closed in April 2021 until December 2022 for conversion to 1,000 mm (3 ft 3 3/8 in) gauge. Since 2019, the Swiss Federal Railways has been undertaking renovation and expansion works at Liestal which were commissioned by the federal government and which are due to be completed in 2025.

== Layout ==
Following the 2025 rebuild, Liestal has three platforms. On the east side of the station is a side platform which faces track 1; physically adjoining this platform is a bay platform serving track 40. (Note: SBB considers this a single side platform serving tracks 1 and 40). In the middle of the station is an island platform serving tracks 2 and 3. On the west side of the station is a second island platform serving tracks 4 and 5. Track 5 serves the tram line to Waldenburg.

== Services ==
As of the December 2025 timetable change, the following services stop at Liestal:

- EuroCity / InterCity / Intercity Express (ICE): half-hourly service between Basel SBB and Spiez; trains continue from Spiez to Interlaken Ost or Brig. Five trains per day serve Berlin Ostbahnhof, Hamburg-Altona, or Dortmund.
- InterRegio:
  - hourly service between Basel SBB and Lucerne.
  - hourly service between Basel SBB and Zürich Hauptbahnhof.
- Basel trinational S-Bahn /: service every fifteen minutes to Basel SBB; every half-hour to Laufen and Olten with additional peak hour service to Sissach; and two trains per day to Delémont.
- Baselland Transport Waldenburg line 19: service every 15 minutes to Waldenburg.
