= Swiss Central Railway =

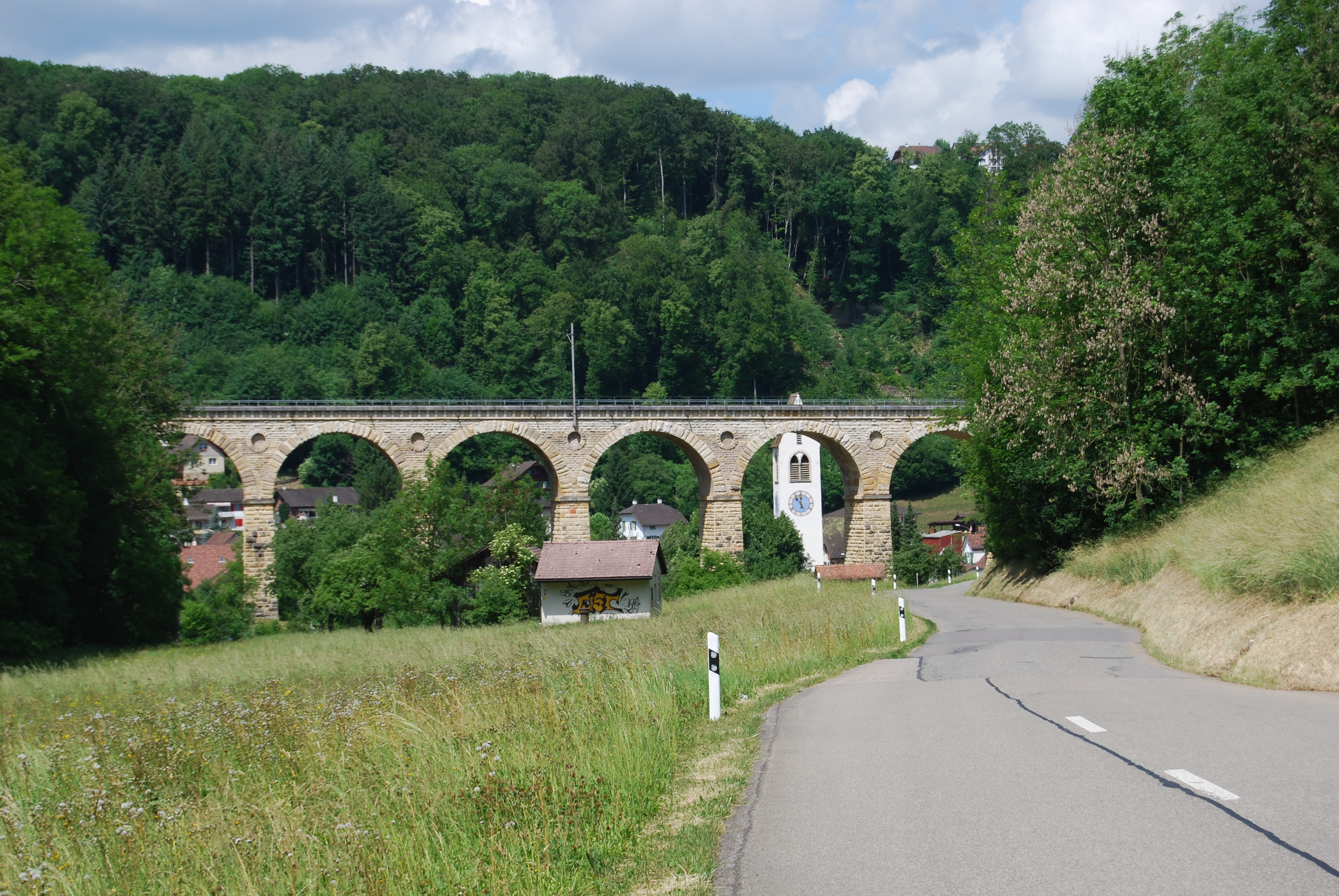
- Rümlingen viaduct, built by the SCB

Overview
- Native name: Schweizerische Centralbahn

History
- Opened: 4 February 1853
- Closed: 1902

Technical
- Track gauge: 1,435 mm (4 ft 8 1/2 in) standard gauge

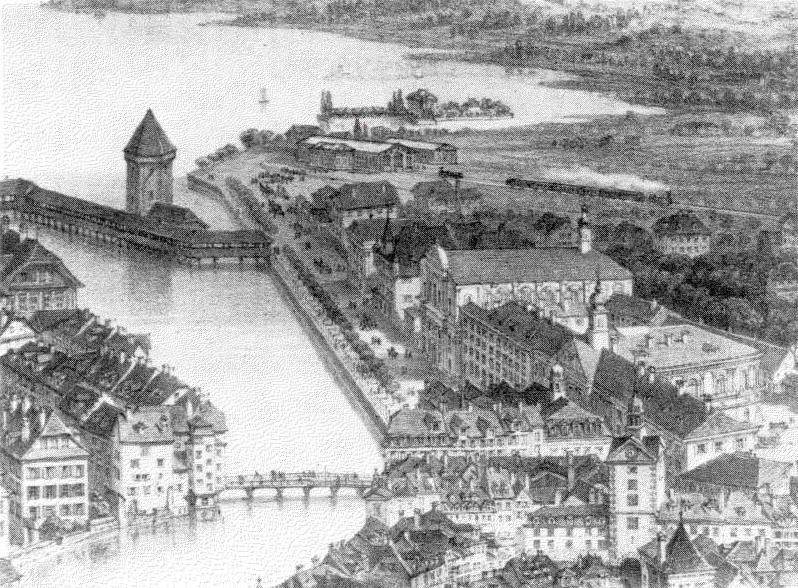
Far from the city, a train leaves the first station in Lucerne.

The Swiss Central Railway (Schweizerische Centralbahn; SCB or S.C.B.) was one of the five major private railway companies of Switzerland. The SCB with a track length of 332 kilometres was integrated into the Swiss Federal Railways (SBB) in 1902.

== History ==
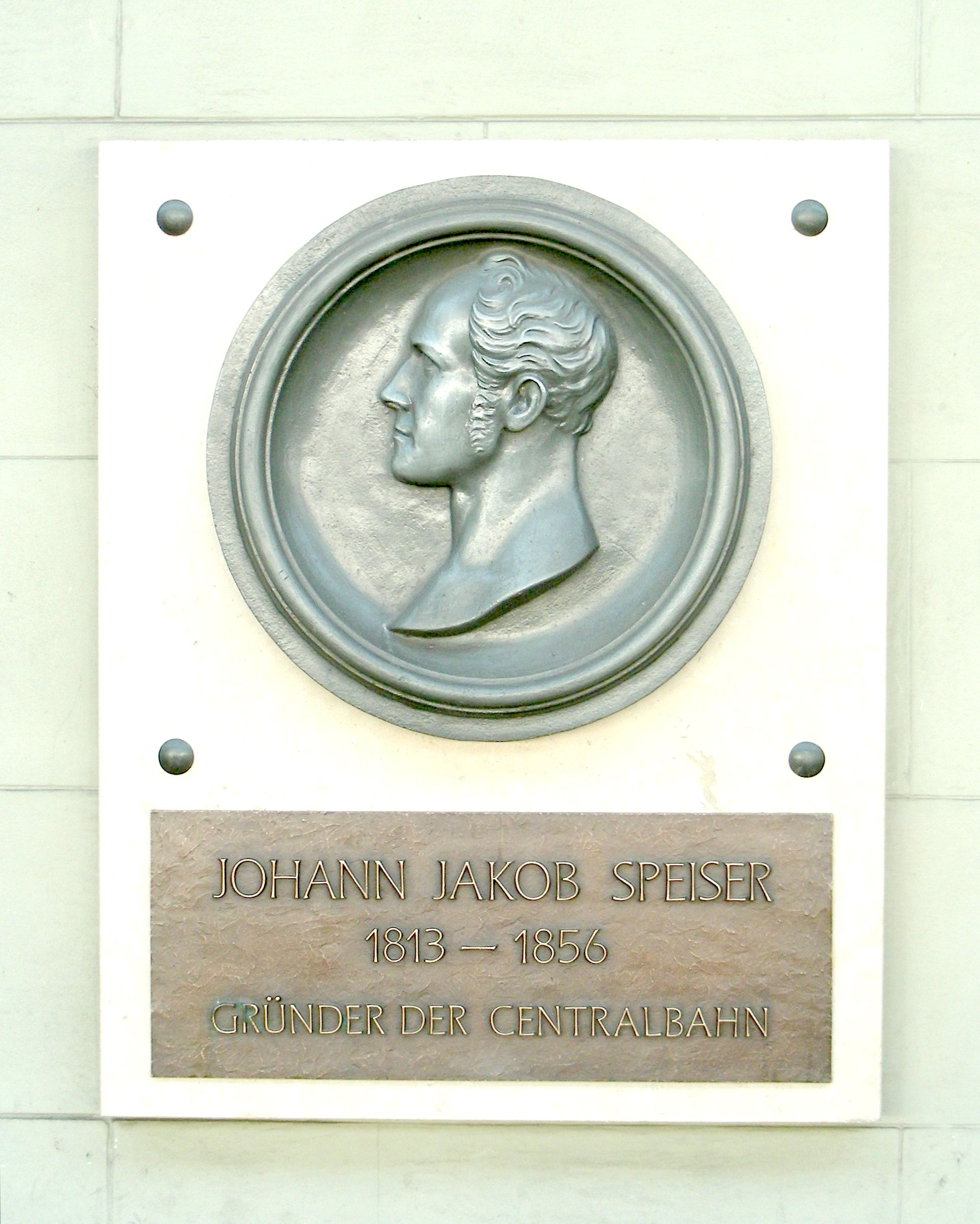
Jakob Speiser plaque in Olten station

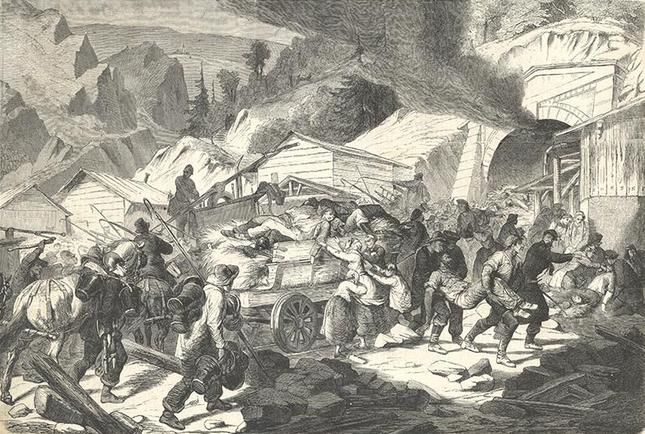
Contemporary representation of the Hauenstein tunnel, wood engraving

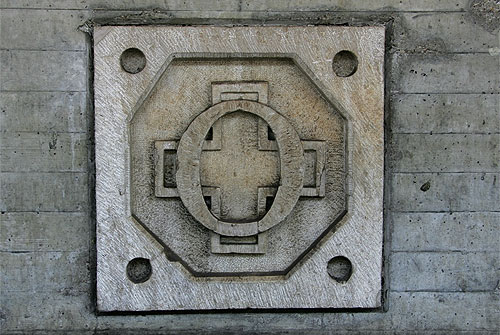
The stone relief in Olten station with the number 0 and the Swiss cross marks the former zero point for the measurement of distances on the railway lines.

The SCB based in Basel was founded on 4 February 1853 by Johann Jakob Speiser, Achilles Bischoff and Karl Geigy. The shares were mainly owned by Parisian banks. But Basel banks and the cantons of Basel-Stadt and Basel-Landschaft were also involved. The issue of shares worth Swiss Francs (CHF) 36 million and bonds worth CHF 12 million were planned. Speculation on the Paris stock exchange, however, led to a sharp fall in prices. Thus, the value of the SCB shares fell from CHF 500 to 200 and the share capital finally amounted to only CHF 14.5 million. The cantons of Luzern and Bern and Bernese municipalities rescued the company by buying shares and subsidies totaling CHF 6 million.

The main goal of the SCB was the construction of a railway network in the shape of a cross with its centre at Olten. Its intention was to forestall Zürich interests who wanted to build a line via Turgi to Waldshut on the Baden bank of the Rhine to Basel. The Canton of Solothurn initially wanted to grant a concession only for the Hauenstein line to Olten. It wanted to ensure that a direct Olten–Solothurn–Biel/Bienne line was built instead of a branch line from Herzogenbuchsee to Solothurn.

The issue of concessions for railway lines in Aargau was also controversial because there was a fight between the interests of Basel and Zürich in this canton. Zürich and Neuchâtel planned a link via Les Verrières to France, competing with the SCB. The canton of Basel-Landschaft refused to issue a concession for a Bötzberg Railway, which caused considerable disagreement in Aargau. Nevertheless, the SCB finally received a concession for the Olten–Murgenthal and Aarburg–Zofingen sections. The section from Aarau to the canton border near Wöschnau was, on the other hand, given to the Northeastern Railway (Nordostbahn; NOB).

The line crossed the Jura between Sissach and Olten with gradients of up to 2.6% and passed through the 2.5 km-long Hauenstein Tunnel from Läufelfingen to Trimbach, Switzerland's longest tunnel at the time. Cost overruns and building delays of more than a year brought the SCB close to bankruptcy. CHF 4 million of investment aid from the federal government and bonds worth CHF 12 million from Basel and Stuttgart banks secured further funding in 1857.

SCB was able to build lines from Basel via Liestal and Olten to Bern, Aarau, Thun, Biel/Bienne and Lucerne. In 1858, after the construction of the Schanzen tunnel, the SCB network was connected with the NOB network at Aarau. In 1860, SCB's network connected on the cantonal border near Bern with the Lausanne–Fribourg–Bern Railway (Chemin de fer Lausanne–Fribourg–Berne) and on Lake Biel with the Schweizerische Ostwestbahn (Swiss East-West Railway). In the same year, the Chemins de fer de l'Est linked its network in Basel with the Central Railway, giving the SCB a direct connection to the international rail network.

In Olten there is a stone relief documenting the zero point of the distance measurement of the railway lines prescribed by the Federal Government. From the starting point in Olten, the SCB measured line distances in hours. However, the stone never marked kilometre 0 for the SCB. When the old Swiss measures were metricised in 1877, the Central Railway changed the distance designation of its railway lines. Since then, the metric chainage of the SCB lines has had its starting point in Basel.

=== Workshop ===
The SCB built its main workshop at Olten station around 1855. This, in addition to the usual maintenance work, also produced new locomotives and freight wagons. The modern SBB workshop emerged from the SCB workshop.

=== Traffic development ===
SCB's annual reports provide information on the rapidly growing volume of rail traffic on the network. The capacity of the Hauenstein line, at that time the only railway connection from the Rhine Valley to the Swiss Plateau, proved inadequate after just a few years.

The SCB was of vital importance for supplying Switzerland with imported goods such as grain or coal. As a result goods traffic was large and grew steadily. The improvement in the company’s financial situation, led to calls for further expansions of its network.

=== Railway crisis ===
Swiss Central Railway 1880–1901

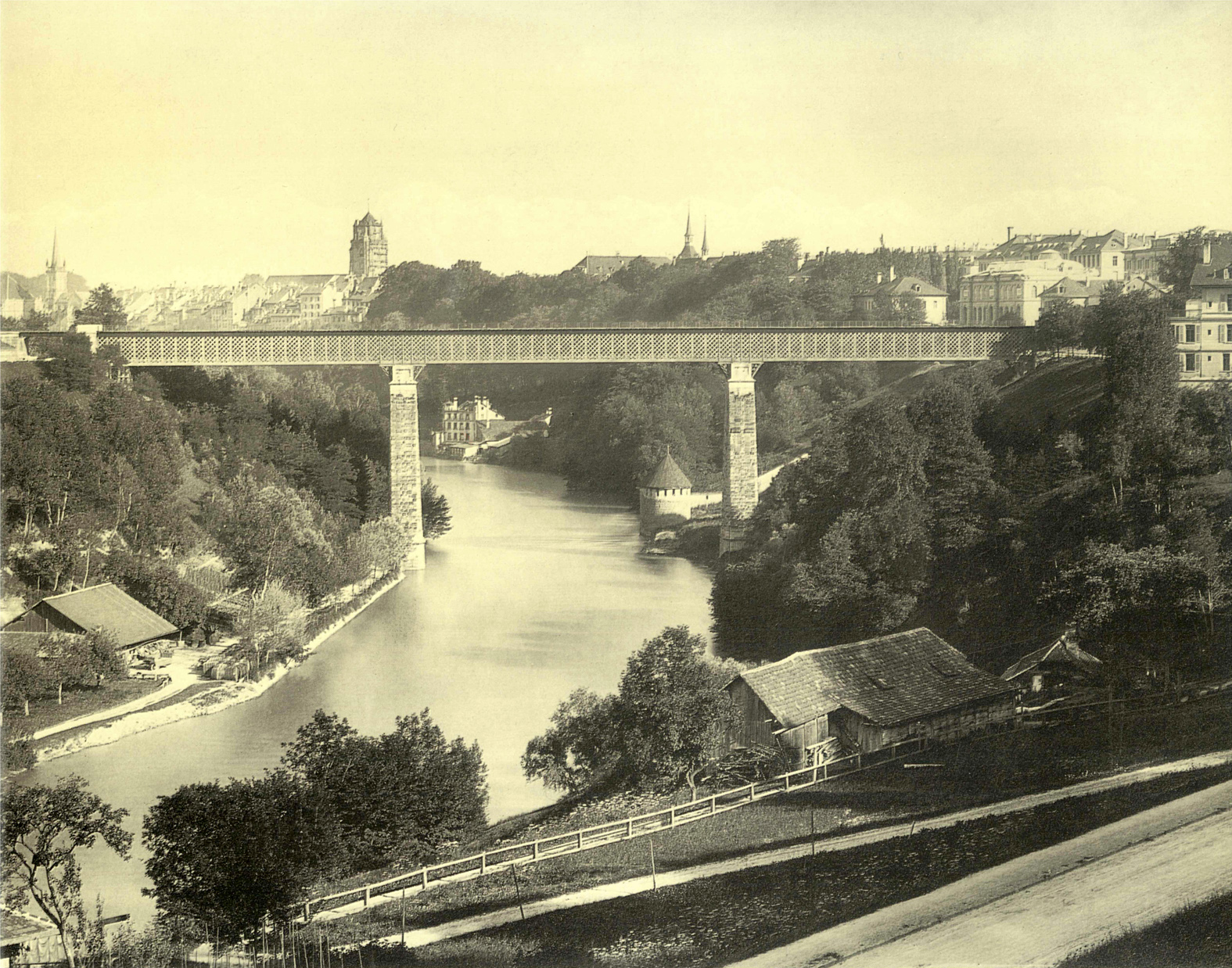
Red bridge over the Aare in Bern, with the Minster in the background, around 1870

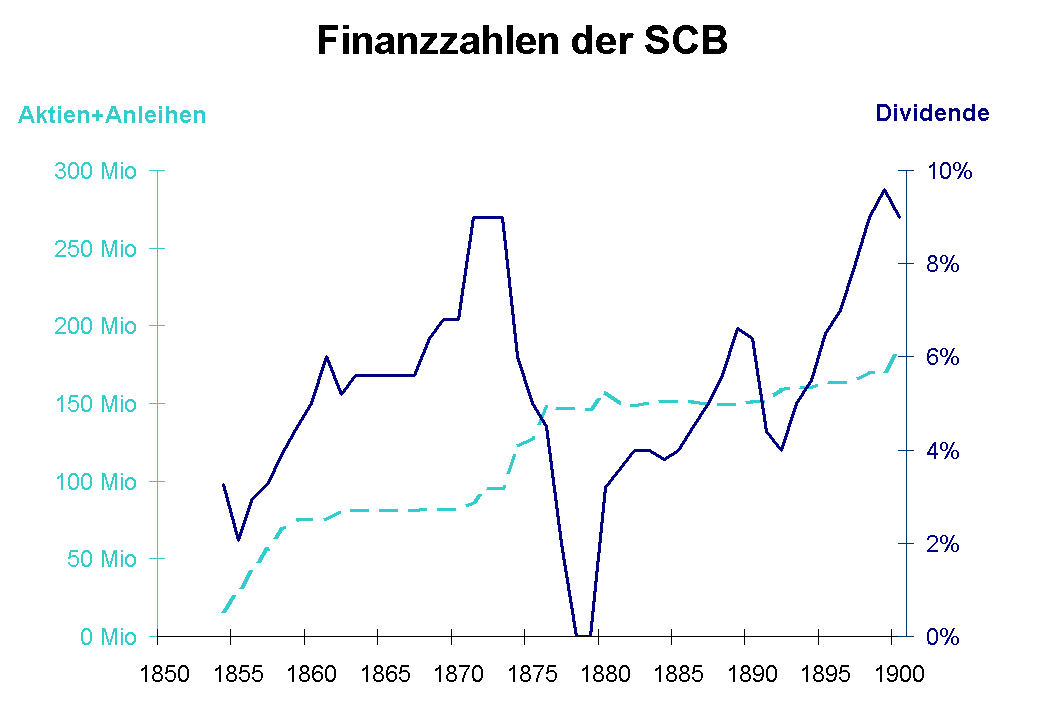
Share capital and fixed bonds (left scale) as well as dividends (right scale) of the SCB

Bridge on the Basel Connecting Line during the First World War

From 1872, the Swiss National Railway (Schweizerische Nationalbahn; SNB) tried to establish competition with the existing railway companies with a second rail link between Lake Geneva and Lake Constance (Bodensee). Originally, the National Railway planned a line from Aarau via Olten through the Gäu to Solothurn and on to Lyss. Along with the NOB, the SCB made daring commitments to build new lines to fight the competition. In 1872, the SCB entered into an undertaking with the canton of Solothurn to build the Gäu Railway (Gäubahn; Olten–Solothurn–Lyss, now considered part of the Jura Foot Railway), along with the Solothurn–Biberist branch line (now considered part of the Solothurn–Langnau railway). In return, Solothurn demanded the creation of the Waterfalls Railway (Wasserfallenbahn) from Liestal through the Jura to Solothurn and its continuation from Solothurn to Schönbühl near Bern. The SCB also committed to build a local railway (Lokalbahn) from Liestal to Waldenburg and to participate in the Sissach–Gelterkinden tramway (Sissach-Gelterkinden-Bahn), including funding a third of its construction costs. The SCB increased its share capital from CHF 37.5 to 50 million in 1873 to finance the construction of new lines and the duplication of parts of the old network.

When Alsace-Lorraine was ceded to Germany as a result of the Franco-Prussian War in 1871, attempts were made to build a rail link from Delle to Lucerne via Delémont and Langenthal (Jura–Gotthard Railway). In addition, the Bern-Lucerne Railway (Bern-Luzern-Bahn; BLB) planned a line to the Gotthard via Langnau. To defend against this double competition, the SCB began construction of the Langenthal–Wauwil railway. It would have connected the Olten–Bern and the Olten–Lucerne lines and significantly shortened the detour via Aarburg.

However, the raising of additional funds was difficult due to the economic crisis and led to significant restrictions on the construction program. The construction of the Waterfalls Railway and the Langenthal–Wauwil line, in which CHF 3.5 million had already been invested, had to be abandoned. The payment of dividends was discontinued and the net income of 2 ½ years was used to write off the construction costs of the discontinued lines. In 1881, the unrealised Waterfalls Railway cost the SCB the deposit of CHF 125 000 that it had paid for the concession. The construction of the Waldenburg Railway was left to a special undertaking.

The SCB had more success with the joint ventures with the NOB. The SCB together with the NOB built the Bötzberg Railway from Pratteln to Brugg AG from 1871 to 1875 and the Aargau Southern Railway (Aargauische Südbahn), which connected their lines to the Gotthard Railway from Rupperswil via Wohlen to Immensee, operated by the Central Railway, from 1873 to 1882. The opening of these two lines led to a decline in traffic on the Hauenstein line.

The construction of the Basel Connecting Line also occurred in this period. In the Treaty on the Construction and Operation of the Gotthard Railway, Switzerland undertook to connect its network with the Baden Railways by rail over the Rhine. The Basel Connecting Line was built by the SCB together with the Grand Duchy of Baden State Railways and put into operation on 3 November 1873. A year before, the section of the Strasbourg–Basel railway from the French border at St. Ludwig to the Centralbahnhof (Note: now Basel SBB) was transferred from the Chemins de fer de l'Est to the SCB under a federal decree. The Salinenbahn (Salt Railway) from Pratteln to the Schweizer Salinen (Swiss salt works) at Schweizerhalle was opened on 28 October 1872.

=== Recovery and nationalisation ===
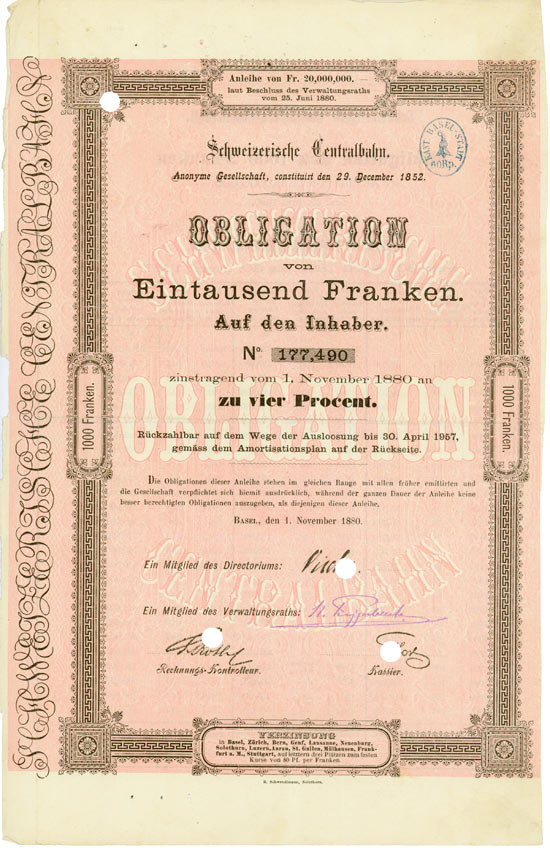
Swiss Central Railway bond worth CHF 1000 from 1 November 1880

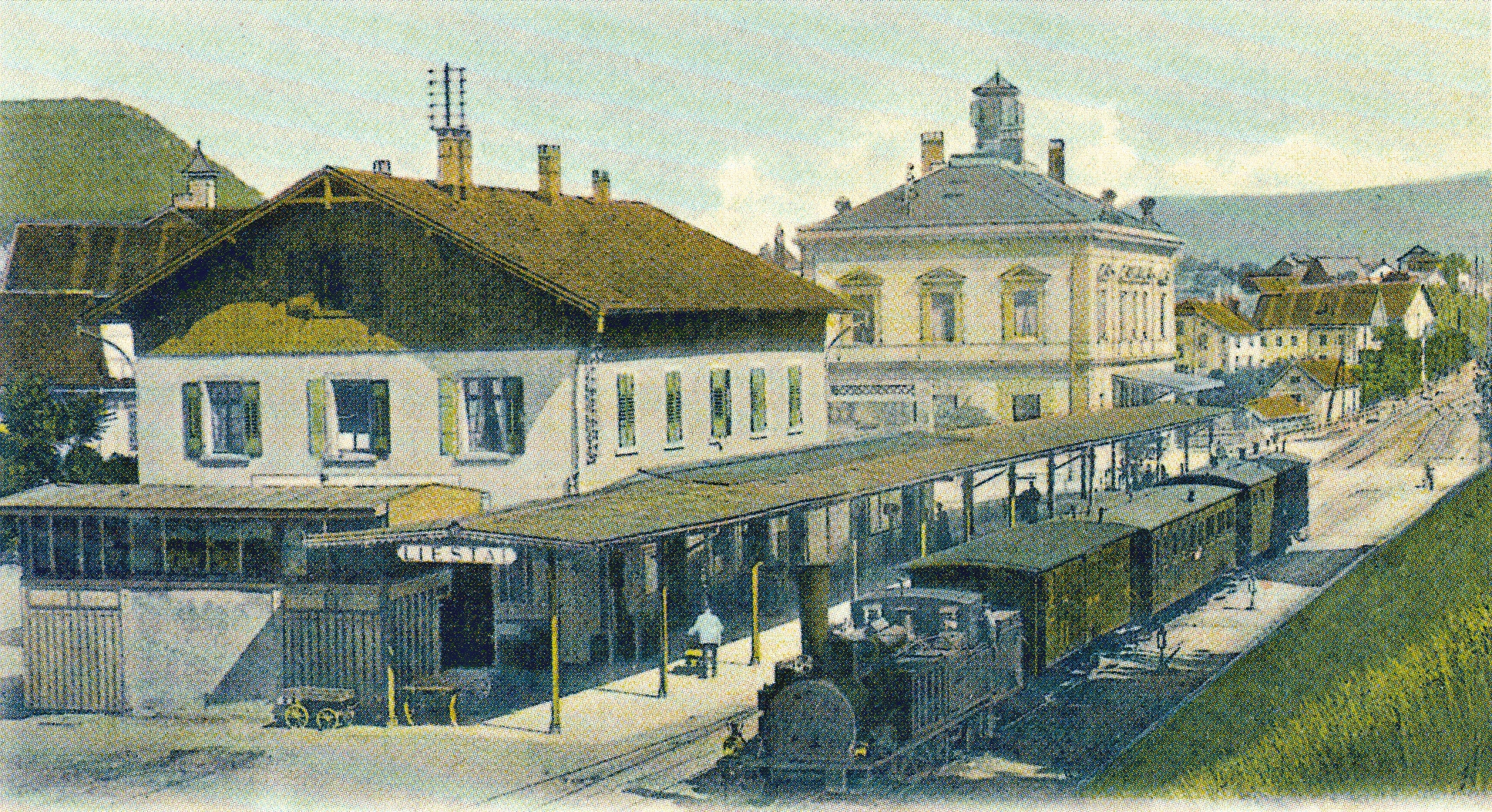
Liestal station around 1890 with only two through tracks. The 750 mm-gauge Waldenburg Railway, which opened in 1880, shared a section of track with the SCB line to Altmarkt junction using four rails

The opening of the Gotthard Railway gave the SCB a strong boost from 1882 onwards. Both passenger and freight traffic increased strongly and permanently. The SCB received half the profits of the highly profitable Bötzberg Railway. Also, the initially loss-making Southern Railway produced abundant profits from 1882, half of which were paid to the SCB. As early as 1873, SCB was again able to pay dividends to shareholders, which reached nine or more percent of the capital value of shares between 1898 and 1900. These high payments to shareholders shortly before the nationalisation did not meet with approval everywhere.

The railway crisis caused many domestic shareholders to sell their shares to domestic and foreign banks. The railway shares played an important role in speculation on the stock market. The new majority of foreign shareholders considered short-term profit maximisation to be the main priority of the company. In 1887 and 1896, the management was replaced by a president who was more comfortable with the banks.

On 30 May 1898, a group of track workers employed by the Swiss Central Railway was run over by a passenger train of the Northeastern Railway at the southern exit from the Gütsch tunnel near Lucerne. Seven railway workers were killed immediately and four seriously injured. On 4 June 1899, the Zurich–Geneva night express of the NOB ran past a designated stopping point in Aarau and ran into two stationary Central Railway locomotives. The accident caused two deaths and three serious injuries.

In 1891, a banking consortium offered the federal government the majority of shares in SCB. The policy would have had a great impact on the SCB. However, a referendum was called to prevent the purchase because of its high cost and it was rejected by the voters. The nationalisation of SCB was only decided in 1898 with the adoption of the repurchase law. The Central Railway became the property of the Confederation in 1902 and became part of the Swiss Federal Railways (SBB).

== Infrastructure ==
=== Stations ===
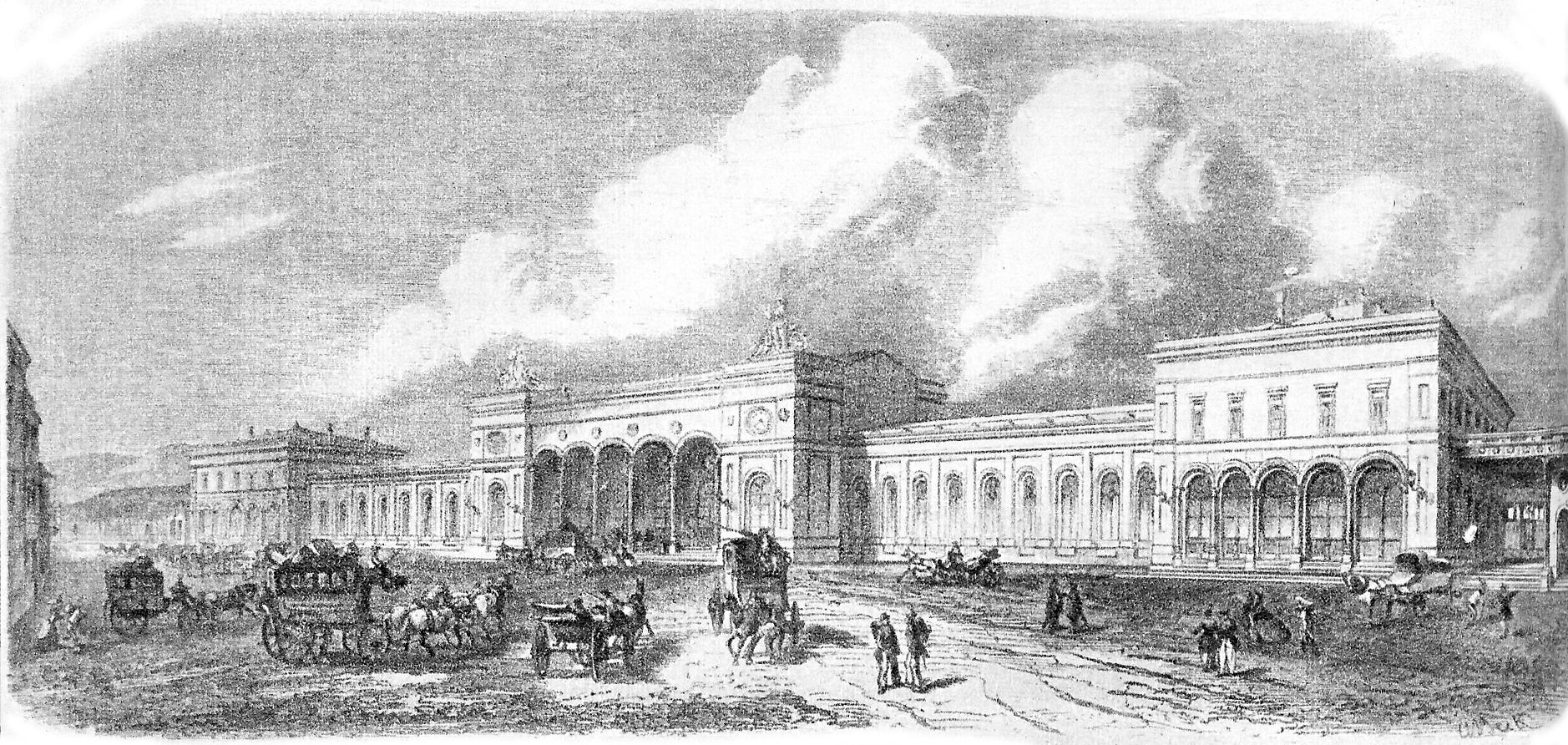
Basel Centralbahnhof in 1861

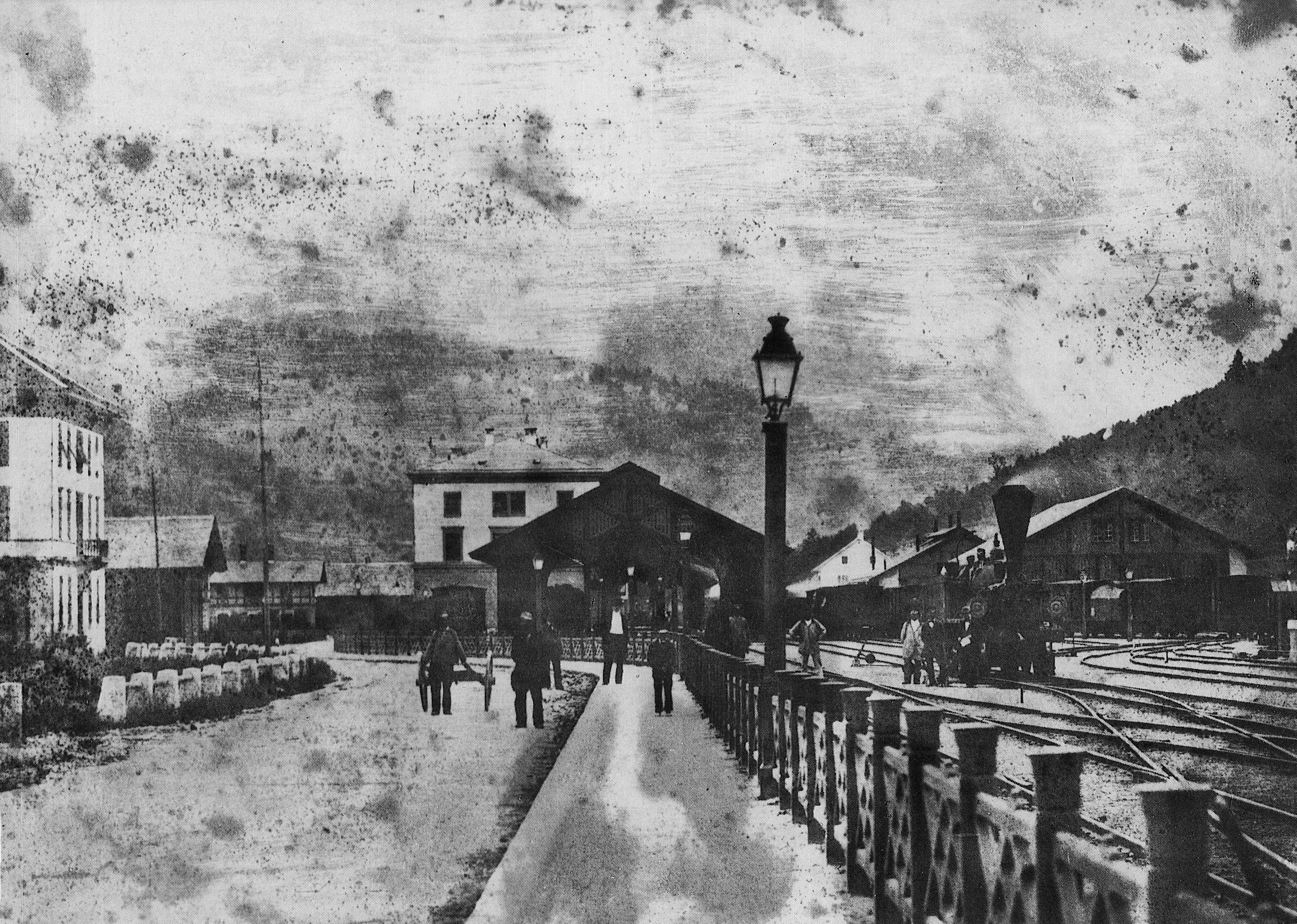
Olten station, about 1860

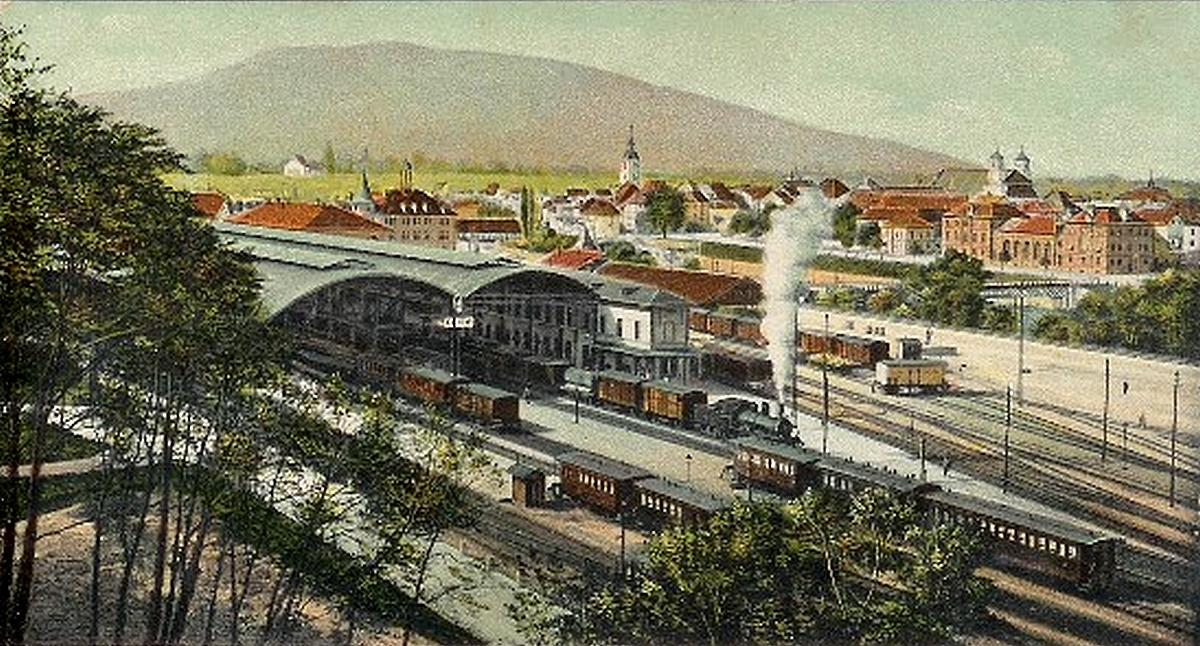
Olten station, about 1900

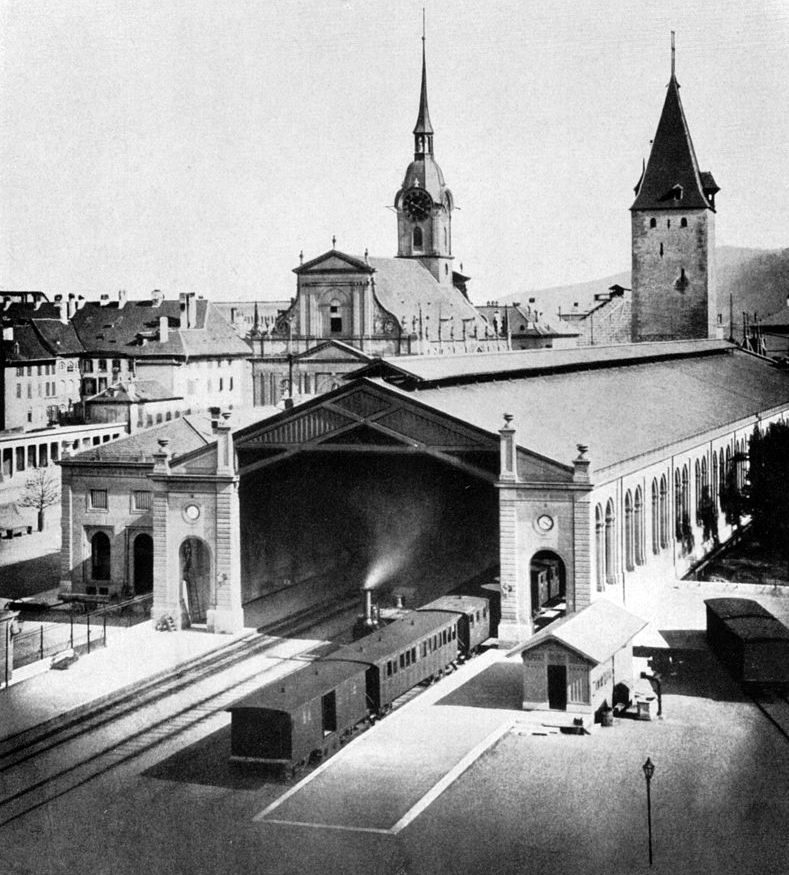
Bern station in 1860

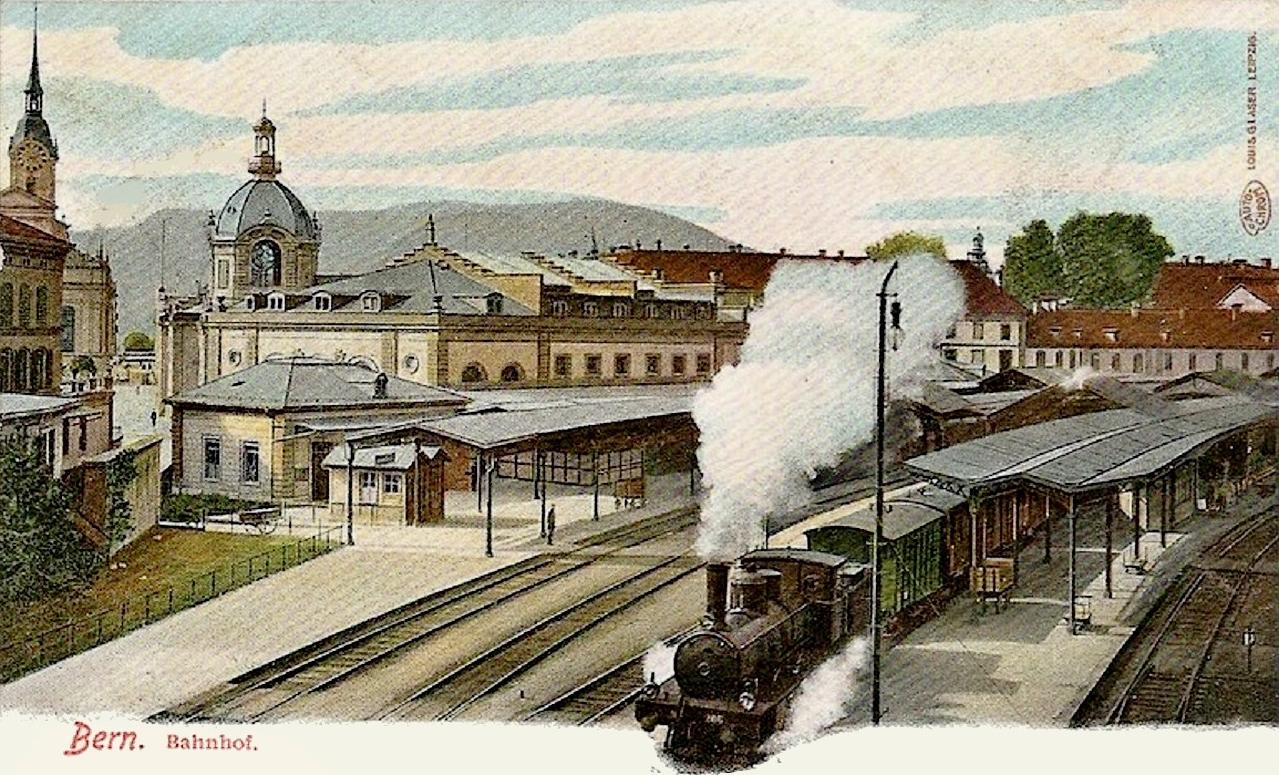
Bern station, opened in 1891

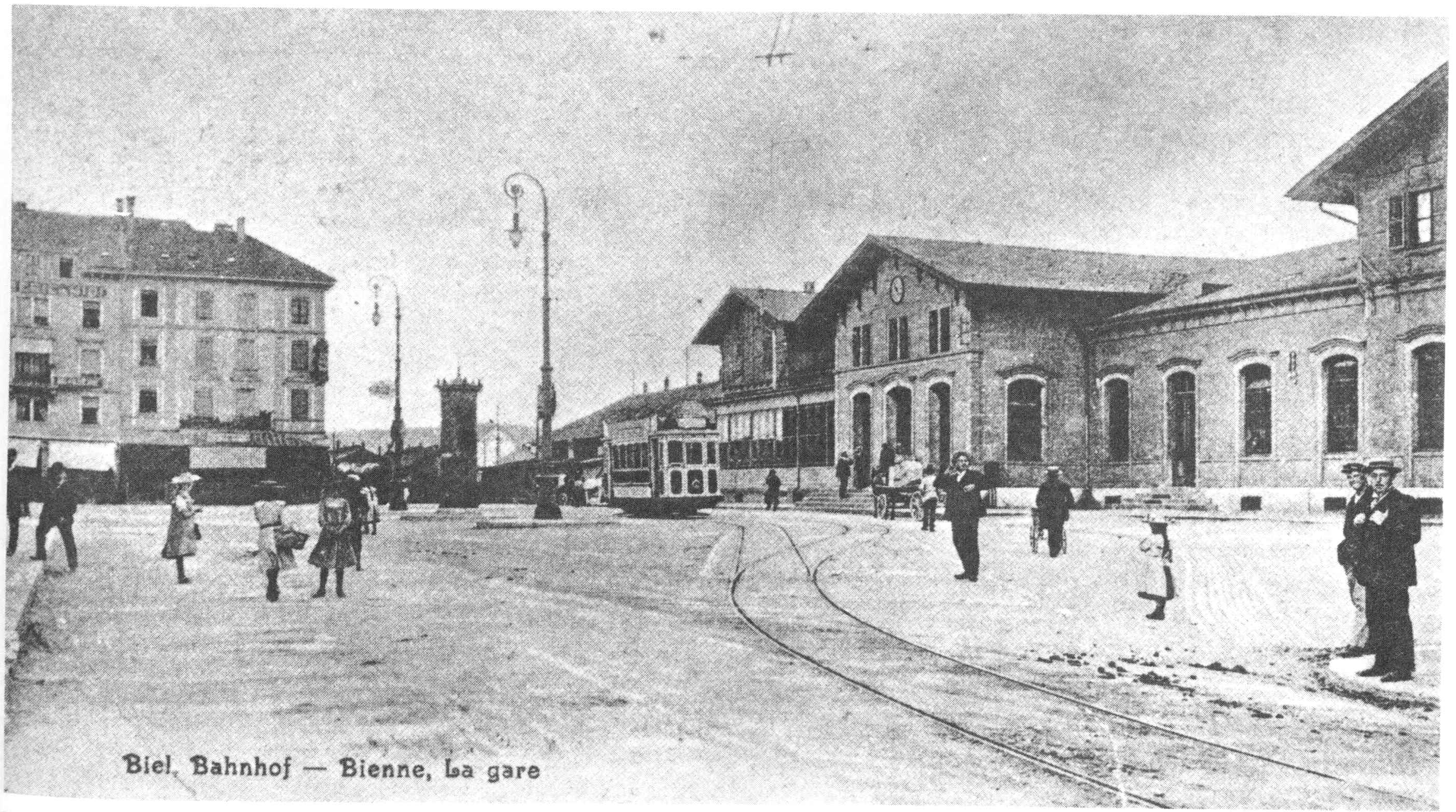
Biel/Bienne station, built in 1864

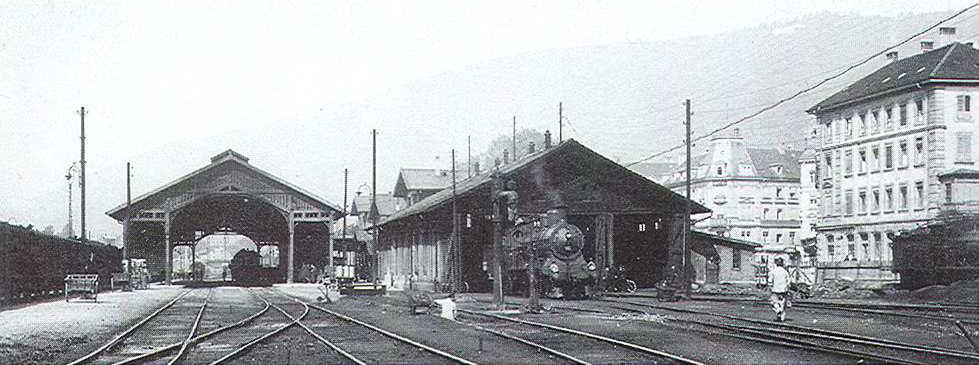
Biel/Bienne station, built in 1864

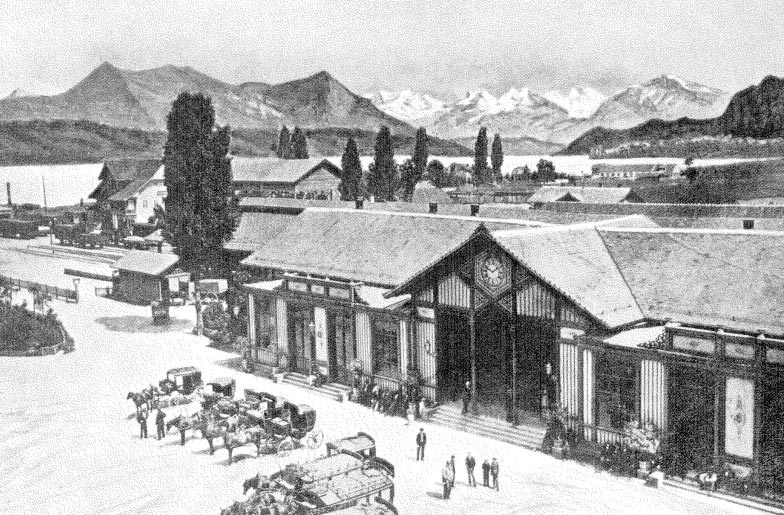
First Lucerne station

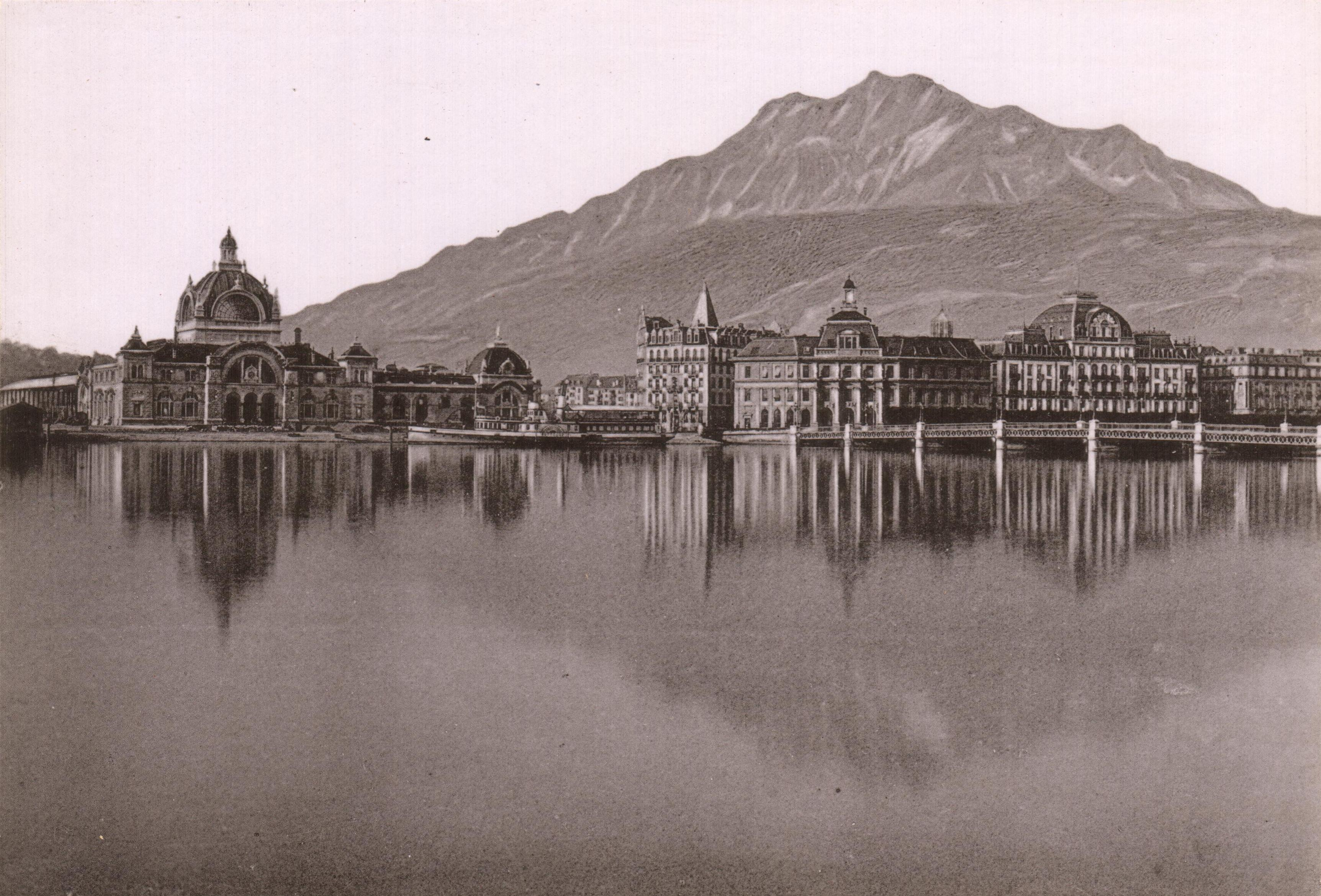
Second Lucerne station built in 1896 on the left, lake bridge on the right

=== Network ===
No.	Railway	Section	Opening	Duplicated	Remarks	Length
1.	St. Ludwig–Basel	St. Ludwig–Basel St. Johann	(15 June 1844)	(15 June 1860)	Taken over by the EST on 1 May 1872	3.5 km
1.	St. Ludwig–Basel	Basel St. Johann–Basel Centralbahnhof	(15 June 1860)	(15 June 1860)	Taken over by the EST on 1 May 1872	3.5 km
2.	Basel–Olten –Bern	Basel Centralbahnhof–Pratteln–Liestal	19 Dec. 1854	1857 (Note: Transition from right to left-handed operation on 1 June 1895)	Basel provisional station until 3 June 1860	108 km
2.	Basel–Olten –Bern	Liestal–Sissach	1 June 1855	1857		108 km
2.	Basel–Olten –Bern	Sissach–Läufelfingen	1 May 1857	1 May 1857		108 km
2.	Basel–Olten –Bern	Läufelfingen–Olten	1 May 1858	1 Sept 1858	With Hauenstein Tunnel	108 km
2.	Basel–Olten –Bern	Olten–Aarburg	9 June 1856	1858	Together with Olten–Lucerne railway	108 km
2.	Basel–Olten –Bern	Aarburg–Rothrist	16 March 1857	1874		108 km
2.	Basel–Olten –Bern	Rothrist–Murgenthal	16 March 1857	16 July 1872		108 km
2.	Basel–Olten –Bern	Murgenthal–Herzogenbuchsee	16 March 1857	1874		108 km
2.	Basel–Olten –Bern	Herzogenbuchsee–Zollikofen	16 June 1857	1 June 1896		108 km
2.	Basel–Olten –Bern	Zollikofen–Bern Wylerfeld	16 June 1857	1864	Together with Biel/Bienne–Bern railway of the BSB	108 km
2.	Basel–Olten –Bern	Bern Wylerfeld–Bern	15 Nov 1858	1 July 1859	Together with Bern–Thun railway	108 km
3.	Olten–Aarau	Olten–Wöschnau (SO-AG canton border)	9 June 1856	16 July 1872	Provisional Aarau Schachen station until 30 April 1858	13 km
3.	Olten–Aarau	Wöschnau–Aarau	15 May 1858	16 July 1872	Property of the NOB, leased by the SCB	13 km
4.	Bern–Thun–Scherzligen	Bern Wylerfeld–Gümligen	1 July 1859	–	Together with Bern–Lucerne railway of the BSB	29 km
4.	Bern–Thun–Scherzligen	Gümligen–Thun	1 July 1859	–		29 km
4.	Bern–Thun–Scherzligen	Thun–Scherzligen	1 June 1861	–	Connection to Lake Thun shipping	29 km
5.	(Olten–) Aarburg–Luzern	(Olten–) Aarberg–Zofingen–Emmenbrücke	9 June 1856	–		52 km
5.	(Olten–) Aarburg–Luzern	Emmenbrücke–Untergrund (Note: now Gütsch)	1 June 1859	–		52 km
5.	(Olten–) Aarburg–Luzern	Untergrund–Fluhmühle	1 June 1859	–	Together with the Zug–Lucerne railway of the ZZL	52 km
5.	(Olten–) Aarburg–Luzern	Fluhmühle–Lucerne	1 June 1859	–	Together with the Bern–Lucerne railway of the BSB, giving access to the new Lucerne railway station from 1 January 1896	52 km
6.	Herzogenbuchsee– (Neu Solothurn–) Solothurn (Note: With the opening of the new Solothurn station, the existing station was renamed Alt (old) Solothur. It is now called Solothurn West.)		1 June 1857	–	Part of the Olten–Biel line until 1876	13 km
7.	Gäu Railway: Olten–Biel (–Nidau)	Olten–Neu Solothurn (Note: now Solothurn)	4 Dec. 1876	–	Connection via Herzogenbuchsee until 1876	59 km
7.	Gäu Railway: Olten–Biel (–Nidau)	Solothurn–Biel/Bienne	1 June 1857	–	Biel provisional station until 30 May 1864	59 km
7.	Gäu Railway: Olten–Biel (–Nidau)	Biel–Nidau	1 Aug. 1858	–	Connection to Lake Biel shipping, closed on 10 Dec. 1860	(1 km)
7.	Gäu Railway: Olten–Biel (–Nidau)	Neu Solothurn–Biberist	4 Dec. 1876	–	Transferred to the Emmentalbahn on 21. Nov. 1883	(4 km)
8.	Bern–Thörishaus	Bern–Thörishaus station (BE-FR canton border)	2 July 1860	–	Connection to the line to Fribourg of the LFB	10 km
9.	Pratteln–Schweizerhalle		28 Oct. 1872	–	Connection to Schweizer Salinen (Swiss salt works) (Note: now a siding)	2 km
10.	Neu-Solothurn–Busswil		4 Dec. 1876	–	Connection to the BSB in Busswil	21 km
11.	Zofingen–Suhr		(6 Sept. 1877)	–	Built by the Swiss National Railway (SNB), taken over by NOB on 1 April 1881	17 km
12.	Basel Connecting Line	Basel Centralbahnhof–Basel Badischer Bahnhof	(3 Nov. 1873)	–	Joint venture of the SCB and the BadStB, integrated into the SCB on 1 January 1884	4 km
	Total (190)			122 km (37%)		332 km
Lines shared with other railways:
1.	Suhr–Aarau		(6 Sept. 1877)	–	Built by National Railway, taken over by the SCB together with the NOB on 1 June 1880	24 km
2.	Aargau Southern Railway (ASB)	Rupperswil–Hendschiken–Wohlen–Immensee and Brugg AG–Hendschiken (ASB)	1874 until 1882	–	SCB and NOB (operated by the SCB)	57 km
3.	Wohlen–Bremgarten railway (WM)		1 Sept. 1876	–	SCB, NOB and Bremgarten municipality (operated by the SCB)	7 km
4.	Bötzberg Railway (BöB)	Pratteln–Stein-Säckingen–Brugg	2 Aug. 1875	–	SCB and NOB (operated by the NOB)	48 km
4.	Bötzberg Railway (BöB)	Koblenz–Stein-Säckingen	1 Aug. 1892	–	SCB and NOB (operated by the NOB)	26 km
4.	Bötzberg Railway (BöB)	Total		–	SCB and NOB (operated by the NOB)	73 km

== Rolling stock ==
In 1882, the company owned 97 locomotives, 195 passenger cars and 1609 freight cars.
