= Waldenburg railway =

Railway line in Switzerland

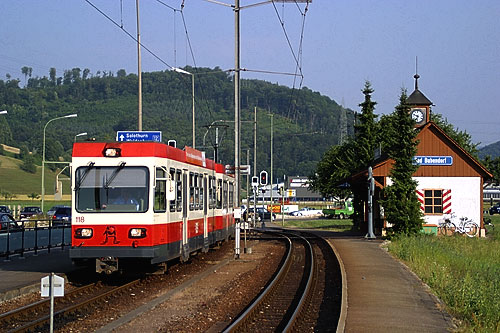
- Stop at Bad Bubendorf (before 2021)

Overview
- Owner: Baselland Transport
- Locale: Switzerland, Canton of Baselland
- Termini: Liestal; Waldenburg

History
- Opened: 1880

Technical
- Line length: 13.1 km (8.1 mi)
- Track gauge: Until 2021: 750 mm (2 ft 5 1/2 in). From 2022: 1,000 mm (3 ft 3 3/8 in).
- Electrification: 1500 V DC
- Maximum incline: 3.8%

The Waldenburg railway (German: Waldenburgerbahn; WB) is a narrow-gauge light rail system in the canton of Basel-Landschaft, Switzerland. The 13.1-kilometre (8.1 mi) long single-track line runs from Liestal, the capital of the canton, to Waldenburg, with stops in Bubendorf, Hölstein, Niederdorf, and Oberdorf. It connects to SBB train services in Liestal railway station. The line was temporarily closed between April 2021 and December 2022 for modernisation and conversion to metre gauge.

Since 2016, the line has been operated by Baselland Transport (BLT), and was, with the exception of a few industrial and funicular lines, the only line in Switzerland with a track gauge of 750 mm (2 ft 5 1/2 in). It was opened on 1 November 1880 and was operated by steam-hauled trains until 1953, when electric operation began. New rolling stock was introduced from 1985. On 5 April 2021, the line closed for rebuilding to 1,000 mm (3 ft 3 3/8 in), and reopened on 11 December 2022. The 750 mm gauge rolling stock was sold for further service on the Čierny Hron Railway in Slovakia.

Since 2022 the line has used ten metre-gauge seven-car Tramlink vehicles built by Stadler Rail. They are painted in the standard yellow Baselland Transport (BLT) livery. Beginning in 2025 the line will undergo automation, becoming fully driverless by 2030.

== History ==
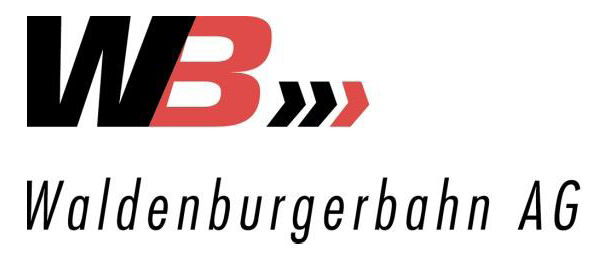
Logo of Waldenburgerbahn AG, which operated the line until 2016

A concession was granted by the canton of Basel-Landschaft on 18 June 1871 for the construction of a narrow gauge railway from Liestal to Waldenburg and eventually further to Langenbruck. In 1873, the concession was altered to give the Swiss Central Railway the commission to build the railway. For financial reasons in 1876 the Swiss Central Railway requested a deadline extension. On 25 November 1879, the Waldenburgerbahn was founded as a separate company and took over the concession for the railway from Liestal to Waldenburg.

After only eight months' construction, the railway opened on 30 October 1880. Seats were provided in second- and third-class carriages. In 1881, the railway served eight stations with four journeys in each direction. The fastest journey over the whole 13 km line took 56 minutes.

In 1909, a committee made an application for the construction of and operation of an electric narrow-gauge railway from Waldenburg through Langenbruck to Balsthal, with a connection from St.Wolfgang to Mümliswil. The outbreak of World War I stopped plans for the extension of the line, and a 1912 proposal to electrify the line and regauge it to 1,000 mm (3 ft 3 3/8 in) gauge.

On 26 October 1953, electric operation of the railway began, using 1500 V DC. New rolling stock was acquired for this.

The pre-2021 rolling stock, consisting of seven railcars and 10 control cars was acquired between 1986 and 1993, replacing the 1953 stock.

In late 2015, the government of Basel-Landschaft canton approved a plan to convert the line from 750 mm gauge to meter gauge in 2023. This will involve new passing loops and extensive reconstruction at Liestal and Waldenburg. The first step was the remodelling of Talhaus station (finished in 2018). Fully automatic operation is also being contemplated. Waldenburgerbahn AG merged into Baselland Transport in 2016. In 2019 BLT ordered ten new light rail vehicles for use on the line after the conversion to metre gauge.

The line closed for conversion to 1,000 mm (3 ft 3 3/8 in) on 6 April 2021, and reopened on 11 December 2022. The 1980s era rolling stock was sold to Čierny Hron Railway in Slovakia. In addition to regauging the line, the following improvements were made:

- rebuilding the terminus station at Waldenburg
- closing Hölstein Süd and Hölstein Weidbächli in favor of a new station, Unterfeld
- several new passing tracks

In 2025, Railway Gazette reported that starting in September 2025, the Waldenburg line will undergo automation and will thus have no driver, with the process completing in 2030.

== Operation ==
The line was originally built to 750 mm (2 ft 5 1/2 in) gauge, and is electrified at 1500 V DC. For most of its route, the line takes the form of a single-track roadside electric tramway. There are 11 intermediate stops, and six passing loops. In December 2022, the line was reopened as a metre gauge railway.

The journey over the whole line takes around 24 minutes. The line forms part of the Tarifverbund Nordwestschweiz (TNW) common fare network, and is numbered 19 in that network's publicity, but this number is not displayed on the vehicles. The line runs a half-hourly service throughout the day, with additional trains during peak hours. Tourist services were formerly operated from spring to autumn by the only operating steam locomotive on the line, 1902-built Number 5 Gédéon Thommen. With the forthcoming conversion of the line to metre gauge, the "Thommen" was retired in September 2018 and is now in a new static display at Talhaus station

== Rolling stock ==
=== Current rolling stock (since 2022) ===
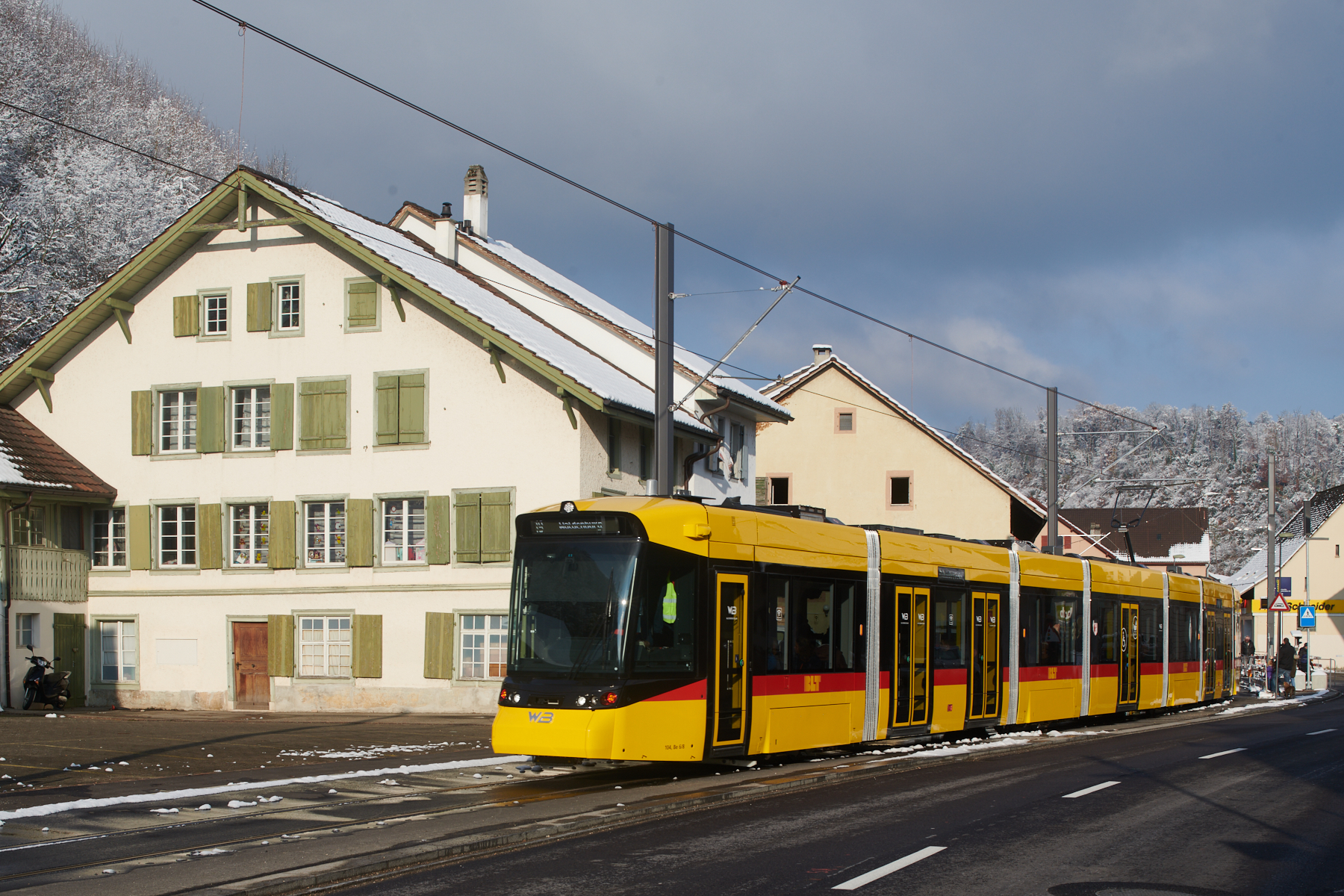
New train at Hölstein

Ten metre-gauge seven-section articulated Tramlink vehicles were built specially for the line by Stadler Rail. They are painted in the standard yellow Baselland Transport (BLT) livery.

=== Former rolling stock (until April 2021) ===
The rolling stock built between 1985 and 1993 has been sold for further service on the Čierny Hron Railway in Slovakia.

| Image | Numbers | Notation | Year | Notes |
|---|---|---|---|---|
| | 5 | G 3/3 | 1902 | Steam locomotive Gedeon Thommen; built by SLM; plinthed at Liestal station in 1961 but returned to working order in 1980; used for tourist service until 2018, now stored in a museum with no intention for future operation. |
| | 11-17 | BDe 4/4 | 1985 to 1993 | Bogie motor cars; 11-14 built in 1985-86; 15-17 in 1993 |
| | 111-120 | Bt | 1985 to 1993 | Bogie driving trailers; 111-114 built in 1985-86; 115-120 in 1993 |
| | | | | Four historic carriages; used for tourist service |

=== Older former rolling stock ===
| Image | Numbers | Notation | Year | Notes |
|---|---|---|---|---|
| | 2 | G 2/2 | 1880 | Steam locomotive Rehhag; built by SLM; by 1913 in use on the construction of the Hauenstein Tunnel; ultimate fate unknown |
| | 4 | G 3/3 | 1887 | Steam locomotive Waldenburg; built by SLM; out of service in 1910 and subsequently scrapped |
| | 4 | G 3/3 | | Steam locomotive Langenbruck; in use up to electrification in 1953; ultimate fate unknown |
| | 6 | G 3/3 | 1912 | Steam locomotive Waldenburg; built by SLM; sold into preservation in 1954; now at the Swiss Museum of Transport in Lucerne |
| | 7 | G 5/4 | 1938 | Steam locomotive; built by SLM; continued in use after electrification but scrapped in 1960 |
| | 1-3 | CFe 4/4; BDe 4/4 | 1953 | Motor cars; out of service; scrapped |

== See also ==
- Rail transport in Switzerland
- History of rail transport in Switzerland
- Trams in Trenčianske Teplice
- Sangi Railway Hokusei Line
