= Sissach railway station =

Railway station in Switzerland

Sissach
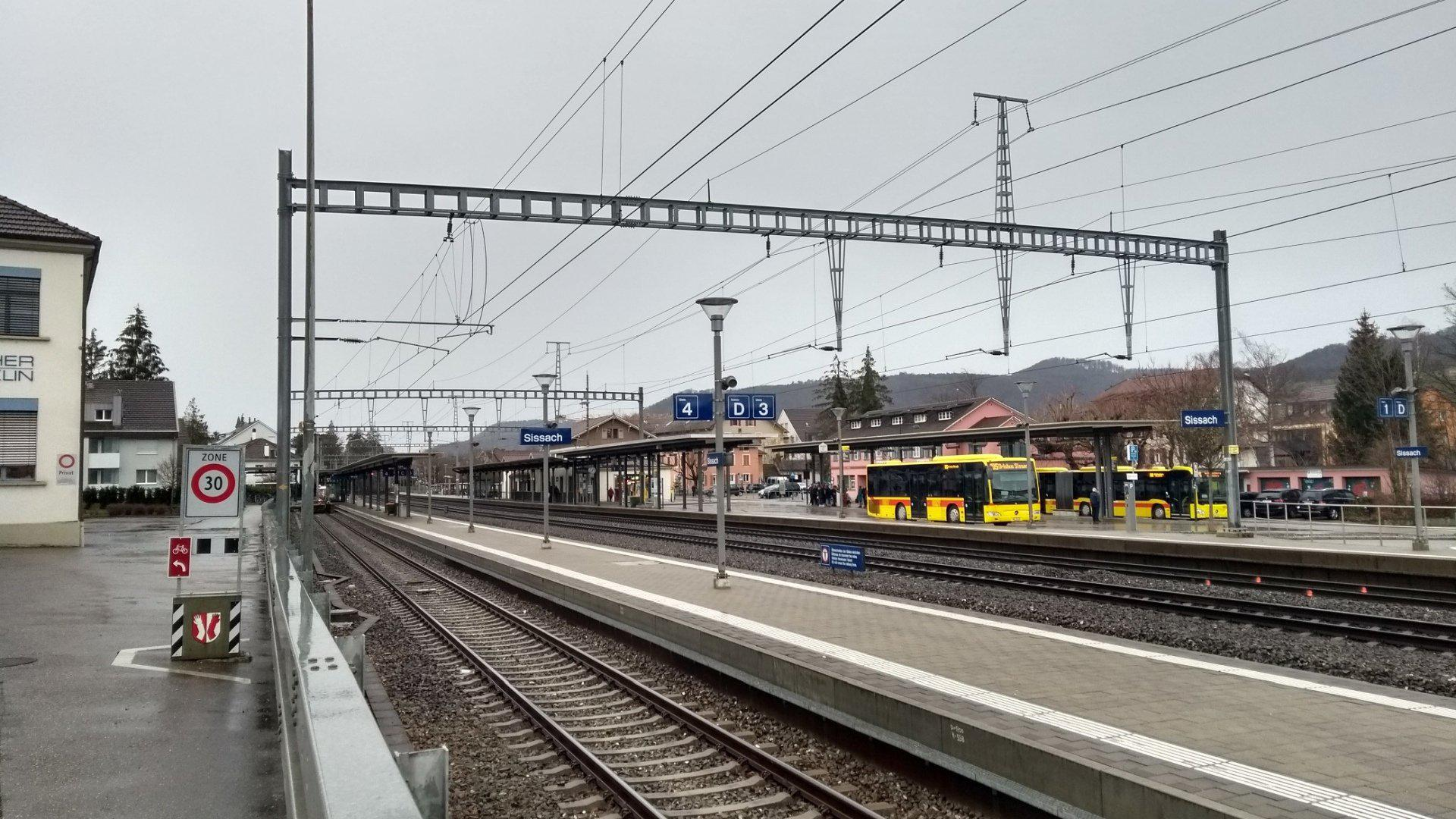
- The station in 2018

General information
- Location: Sissach; Switzerland
- Coordinates: 47°27′46″N 7°48′43″E
- Elevation: 375 m (1,230 ft)
- Owner: Swiss Federal Railways
- Line: Hauenstein line
- Distance: 21.1 km (13.1 mi) from Basel SBB
- Train operators: Swiss Federal Railways
- Connections: Baselland Transport bus lines

Other information
- Fare zone: 30 (tnw)

Passengers
- 2018: 8,800 per weekday

Services
Preceding station	SBB CFF FFS	Following station
Liestal towards Basel SBB	IR 27	Gelterkinden towards Lucerne
Liestal towards Basel SBB	IR 37	Gelterkinden towards Zürich HB
Preceding station	Basel S-Bahn	Following station
Itingen towards Delémont	S3	Gelterkinden towards Olten
Itingen towards Basel SBB	S33	Terminus
Terminus	S9	Diepflingen towards Olten
Location

Sissach railway station (German: Bahnhof Sissach) is a railway station in the municipality of Sissach, in the Swiss canton of Basel-Landschaft. It is an intermediate stop on the standard gauge Hauenstein line of Swiss Federal Railways. At Sissach the Hauenstein line splits; most trains run via the base tunnel to Olten, while Basel trinational S-Bahn S9 trains provide local service over the older summit line.

== Services ==
As of the December 2025 timetable change, the following services stop at Sissach:

- InterRegio:
  - hourly service between Basel SBB and Lucerne.
  - hourly service between Basel SBB and Zürich Hauptbahnhof.
- Basel trinational S-Bahn:
  - /: half-hourly service between Laufen and Olten with additional peak hour service to Basel SBB; and two trains per day to Delémont.
  - : hourly service via the summit line to Olten.
