= Waldenburg, Switzerland =

Waldenburg
- Municipality
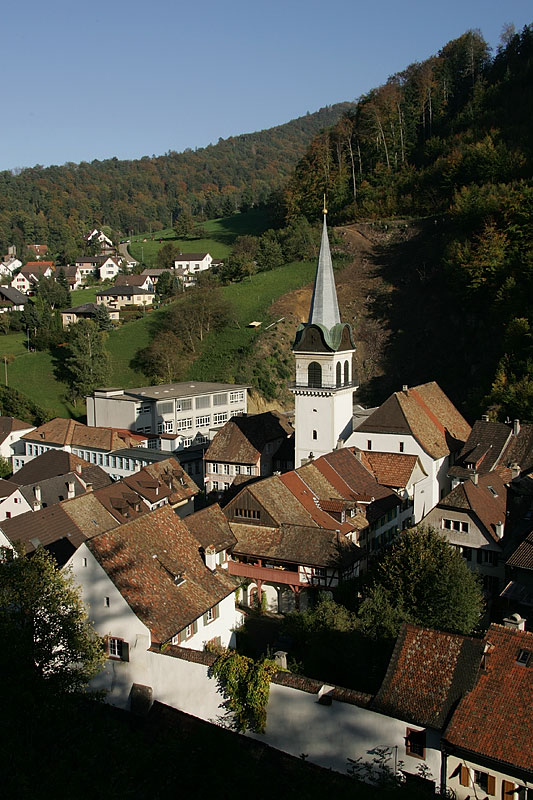

- Flag Coat of arms
- Location of Waldenburg
- Location within Switzerland Location within Canton of Basel-Landschaft
- Coordinates: 47°23′N 7°45′E
- Country: Switzerland
- Canton: Basel-Landschaft
- District: Waldenburg

Government
  - Mayor: Kurt Grieder

Area
  - Total: 8.30 km^{2} (3.20 sq mi)
- Elevation: 532 m (1,745 ft)

Population (June 2021)
  - Total: 1,124
  - Density: 135/km^{2} (351/sq mi)
- Time zone: UTC+01:00 (CET)
  - Summer (DST): UTC+02:00 (CEST)
- Postal code: 4437
- SFOS number: 2895
- ISO 3166 code: CH-BL
- Surrounded by: Langenbruck, Liedertswil, Mümliswil-Ramiswil (SO), Oberdorf, Reigoldswil
- Website: www.waldenburg.ch

Waldenburg (Swiss Standard German pronunciation: [ˈvaldn̩bʊrɡ]) is a municipality in the canton of Basel-Country in Switzerland, and the capital of the district of the same name.

== Geography ==
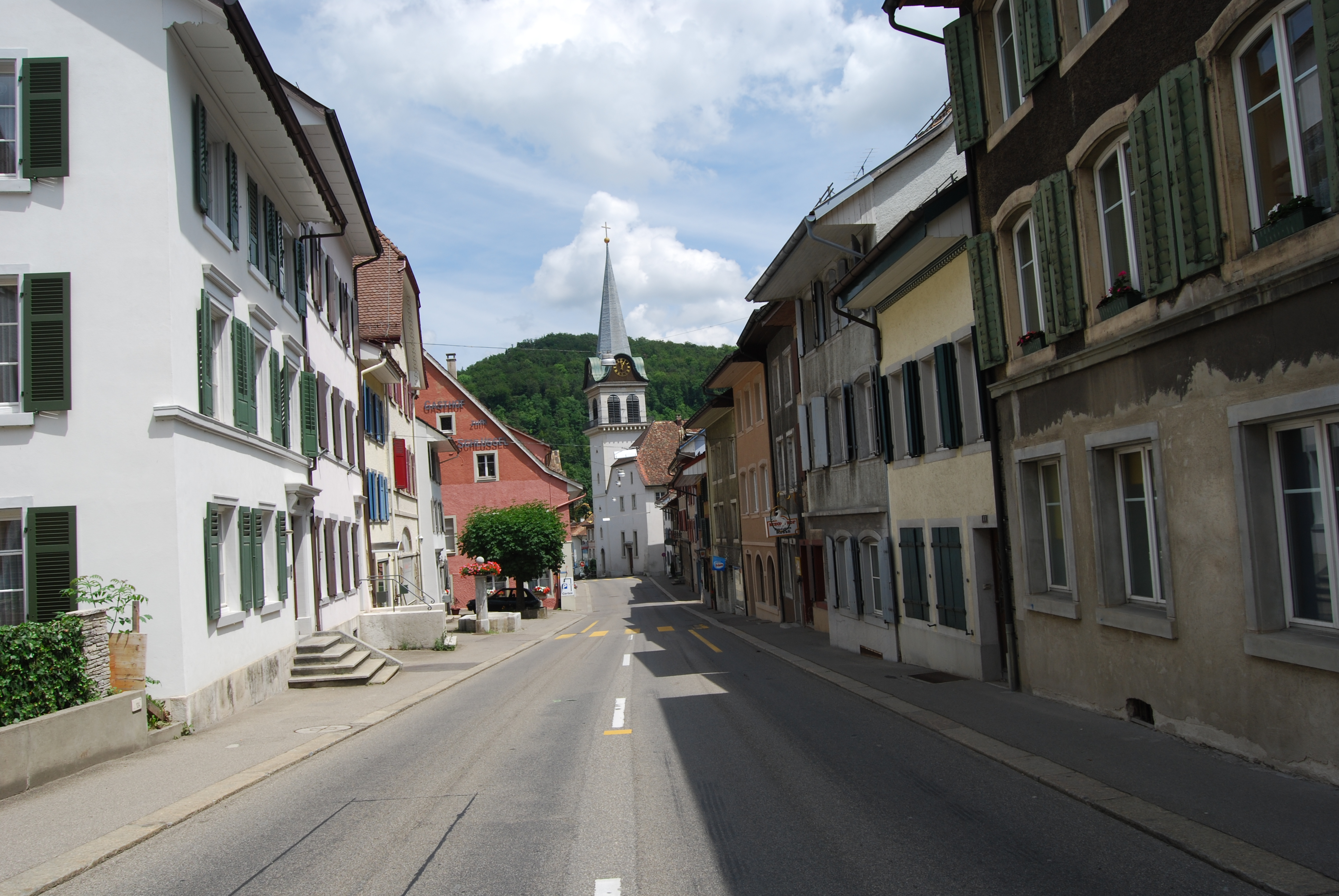
Waldenburg

Aerial view (1949)

Waldenburg has an area, as of 2009, of 8.3 square kilometers (3.2 sq mi). Of this area, 2.61 km^{2} (1.01 sq mi) or 31.4% is used for agricultural purposes, while 5.18 km^{2} (2.00 sq mi) or 62.4% is forested. Of the rest of the land, 0.48 km^{2} (0.19 sq mi) or 5.8% is settled (buildings or roads) and 0.01 km^{2} (2.5 acres) or 0.1% is unproductive land.

Of the built up area, housing and buildings made up 3.9% and transportation infrastructure made up 1.6%. Out of the forested land, 60.0% of the total land area is heavily forested and 2.4% is covered with orchards or small clusters of trees. Of the agricultural land, 0.1% is used for growing crops and 16.4% is pastures, while 1.3% is used for orchards or vine crops and 13.6% is used for alpine pastures.

== Coat of arms ==
The municipal coat of arms was introduced in 1926; it is that of the counts of Frohburg, who owned the village at the time of its first mention (1244); its blazon is Or, an Eagle displayed Vair, langued, beaked and membered Gules.

== Demographics ==
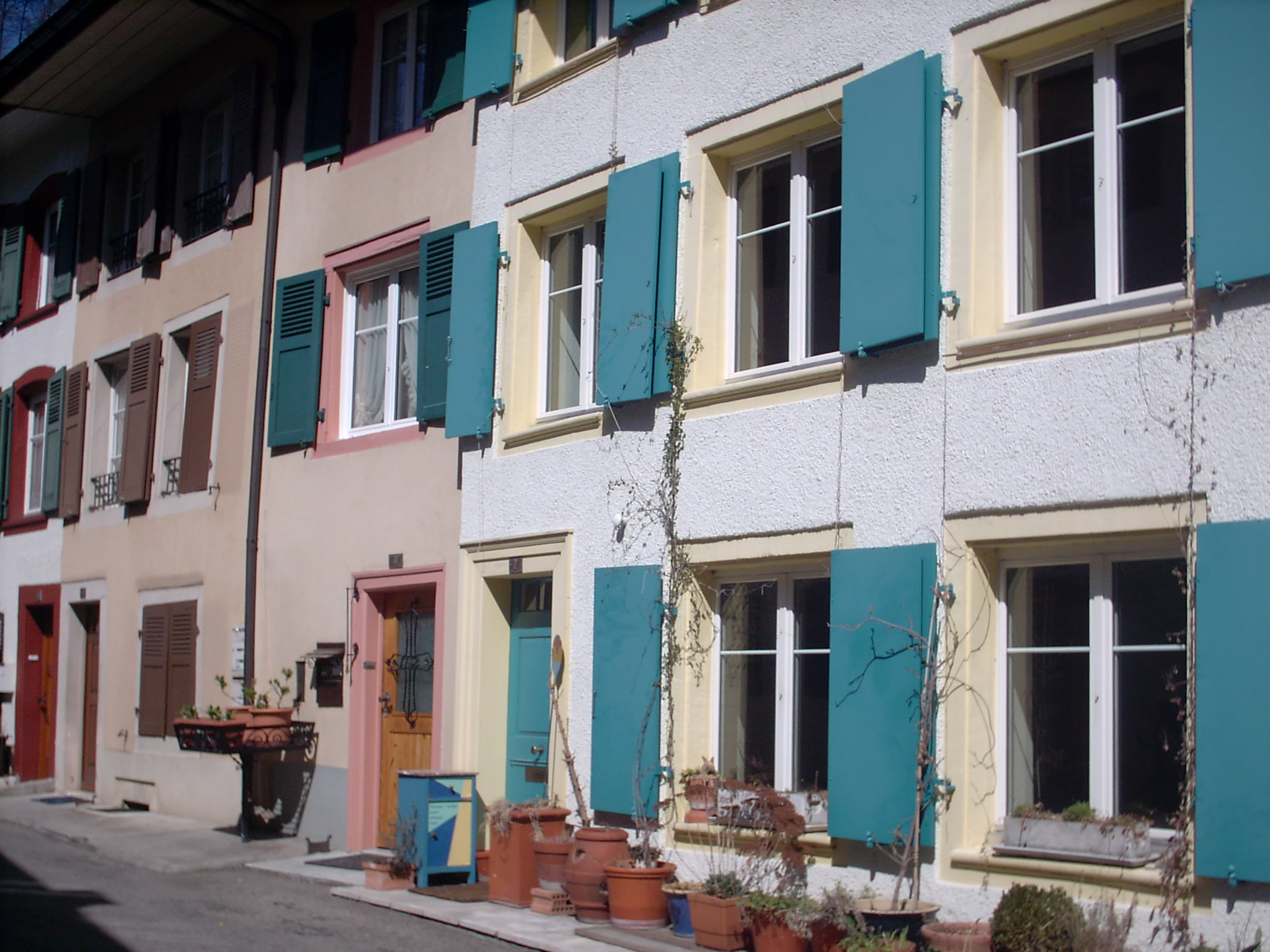
Houses in Waldenburg

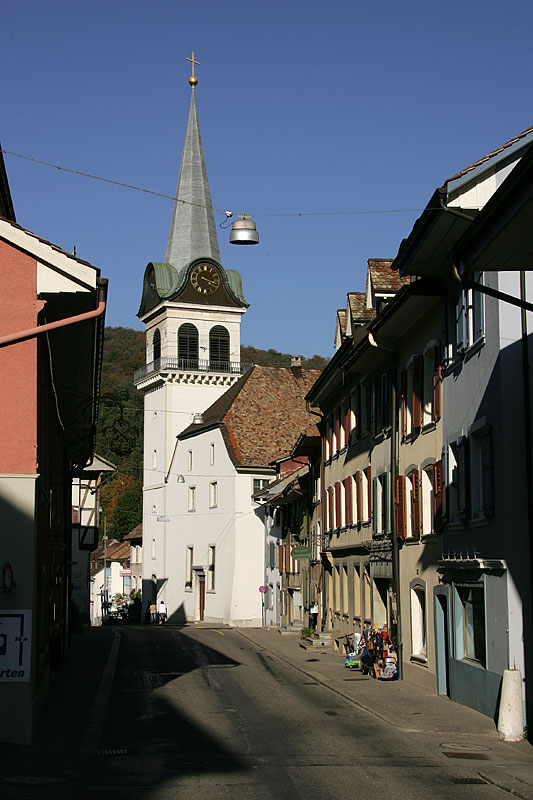
Waldenburg houses and church

Waldenburg has a population (as of June 2021) of 1,124. As of 2008, 27.2% of the population are resident foreign nationals. Over the last 10 years (1997–2007) the population has changed at a rate of -9.8%.

Most of the population (as of 2000) speaks German (1,067 or 80.3%), with Albanian being second most common (104 or 7.8%) and Italian being third (56 or 4.2%). There are 5 people who speak French and 1 person who speaks Romansh.

As of 2008, the gender distribution of the population was 48.9% male and 51.1% female. The population was made up of 881 Swiss citizens (72.9% of the population), and 327 non-Swiss residents (27.1%) Of the population in the municipality 363 or about 27.3% were born in Waldenburg and lived there in 2000. There were 304 or 22.9% who were born in the same canton, while 291 or 21.9% were born somewhere else in Switzerland, and 328 or 24.7% were born outside of Switzerland.

In 2008 there were 8 live births to Swiss citizens and 5 births to non-Swiss citizens, and in same time span there were 10 deaths of Swiss citizens and 3 non-Swiss citizen deaths. Ignoring immigration and emigration, the population of Swiss citizens decreased by 2 while the foreign population increased by 2. There was 1 Swiss man who emigrated from Switzerland. At the same time, there were 9 non-Swiss men and 8 non-Swiss women who immigrated from another country to Switzerland. The total Swiss population change in 2008 (from all sources, including moves across municipal borders) was a decrease of 1 and the non-Swiss population decreased by 5 people. This represents a population growth rate of -0.5%.

The age distribution, as of 2010, in Waldenburg is; 78 children or 6.5% of the population are between 0 and 6 years old and 208 teenagers or 17.2% are between 7 and 19. Of the adult population, 159 people or 13.2% of the population are between 20 and 29 years old. 129 people or 10.7% are between 30 and 39, 216 people or 17.9% are between 40 and 49, and 240 people or 19.9% are between 50 and 64. The senior population distribution is 112 people or 9.3% of the population are between 65 and 79 years old and there are 66 people or 5.5% who are over 80.

As of 2000, there were 561 people who were single and never married in the municipality. There were 624 married individuals, 76 widows or widowers and 67 individuals who are divorced.

As of 2000, there were 523 private households in the municipality, and an average of 2.5 persons per household. There were 163 households that consist of only one person and 69 households with five or more people. Out of a total of 533 households that answered this question, 30.6% were households made up of just one person and 5 were adults who lived with their parents. Of the rest of the households, there are 150 married couples without children, 165 married couples with children There were 33 single parents with a child or children. There were 7 households that were made up unrelated people and 10 households that were made some sort of institution or another collective housing.

In 2000 there were 211 single family homes (or 61.7% of the total) out of a total of 342 inhabited buildings. There were 68 multi-family buildings (19.9%), along with 41 multi-purpose buildings that were mostly used for housing (12.0%) and 22 other use buildings (commercial or industrial) that also had some housing (6.4%). Of the single family homes 62 were built before 1919, while 31 were built between 1990 and 2000.

In 2000 there were 577 apartments in the municipality. The most common apartment size was 4 rooms of which there were 164. There were 12 single room apartments and 182 apartments with five or more rooms. Of these apartments, a total of 504 apartments (87.3% of the total) were permanently occupied, while 40 apartments (6.9%) were seasonally occupied and 33 apartments (5.7%) were empty. As of 2009, the construction rate of new housing units was 1.7 new units per 1000 residents. As of 2000 the average price to rent a two-room apartment was about 626.00 CHF (US$500, £280, €400), a three-room apartment was about 860.00 CHF (US$690, £390, €550) and a four-room apartment cost an average of 953.00 CHF (US$760, £430, €610). The vacancy rate for the municipality, in 2010, was 0.51%.

The historical population is given in the following chart:

== Heritage sites of national significance ==
The prehistoric hill settlement and medieval government center of Gerstelfluh and the villa Gedeon Thommen with park are listed as Swiss heritage site of national significance. The entire old village of Waldenburg is part of the Inventory of Swiss Heritage Sites.

== Politics ==
In the 2007 federal election the most popular party was the SVP which received 39.66% of the vote. The next three most popular parties were the SP (18.52%), the Green Party (16.47%) and the FDP (15.14%). In the federal election, a total of 282 votes were cast, and the voter turnout was 38.7%.

== Economy ==
As of 2010, Waldenburg had an unemployment rate of 4.5%. As of 2008, there were 37 people employed in the primary economic sector and about 11 businesses involved in this sector. 445 people were employed in the secondary sector and there were 14 businesses in this sector. 160 people were employed in the tertiary sector, with 36 businesses in this sector. There were 675 residents of the municipality who were employed in some capacity, of which females made up 40.3% of the workforce.

In 2008 the total number of full-time equivalent jobs was 571. The number of jobs in the primary sector was 26, of which 20 were in agriculture and 6 were in forestry or lumber production. The number of jobs in the secondary sector was 416 of which 403 or (96.9%) were in manufacturing and 13 (3.1%) were in construction. The number of jobs in the tertiary sector was 129. In the tertiary sector; 17 or 13.2% were in wholesale or retail sales or the repair of motor vehicles, 29 or 22.5% were in the movement and storage of goods, 29 or 22.5% were in a hotel or restaurant, 5 or 3.9% were in the information industry, 1 was the insurance or financial industry, 4 or 3.1% were technical professionals or scientists, 12 or 9.3% were in education and 7 or 5.4% were in health care.

In 2000, there were 520 workers who commuted into the municipality and 458 workers who commuted away. The municipality is a net importer of workers, with about 1.1 workers entering the municipality for every one leaving. About 6.0% of the workforce coming into Waldenburg are coming from outside Switzerland. Of the working population, 23.9% used public transportation to get to work, and 45.9% used a private car.

== Religion ==
From the 2000 census, 275 or 20.7% were Roman Catholic, while 613 or 46.2% belonged to the Swiss Reformed Church. Of the rest of the population, there were 27 members of an Orthodox church (or about 2.03% of the population), there was 1 individual who belongs to the Christian Catholic Church, and there were 11 individuals (or about 0.83% of the population) who belonged to another Christian church. There was 1 individual who was Jewish, and 200 (or about 15.06% of the population) who were Islamic. There were 2 individuals who were Buddhist, 2 individuals who were Hindu and 1 individual who belonged to another church. 158 (or about 11.90% of the population) belonged to no church, are agnostic or atheist, and 37 individuals (or about 2.79% of the population) did not answer the question.

== Weather ==
Waldenburg has an average of 140.4 days of rain or snow per year and on average receives 1,155 mm (45.5 in) of precipitation. The wettest month is June during which time Waldenburg receives an average of 127 mm (5.0 in) of rain or snow. During this month there is precipitation for an average of 12.9 days. The month with the most days of precipitation is May, with an average of 13.9, but with only 110 mm (4.3 in) of rain or snow. The driest month of the year is October with an average of 79 mm (3.1 in) of precipitation over 9 days.

== Education ==
In Waldenburg about 469 or (35.3%) of the population have completed non-mandatory upper secondary education, and 130 or (9.8%) have completed additional higher education (either university or a Fachhochschule). Of the 130 who completed tertiary schooling, 56.2% were Swiss men, 22.3% were Swiss women, 14.6% were non-Swiss men and 6.9% were non-Swiss women.

As of 2000, there were 18 students in Waldenburg who came from another municipality, while 96 residents attended schools outside the municipality.

== Transport ==
Waldenburg is the terminus of the Waldenburg narrow gauge railway, which operates a quarter-hourly train service to Liestal. At Liestal railway station, onward connection is made with the Swiss Federal Railway's services to Basel, Bern, Lucerne and Zürich.
