= 1891 Swiss referendums =

Five referendums were held in Switzerland in 1891. The first was held on 15 March on a federal law on federal officials who had become unemployable due to disability, and was rejected by 79.4% of voters. The second was held on 5 July on a constitutional amendment, and was approved by 60.3% of voters. Two referendums were held on 18 October, one on revising article 39 of the federal constitution and one on a federal law on Swiss tariffs; both were approved. The last was held on 6 December on the question of whether the federal government should purchase the Swiss Central Railway, but was rejected by 68.9% of voters.

== Background ==
The two constitutional referendums were mandatory referendums, which required both a majority of voters and cantons. The other three were optional referendums, which meant that only a majority of the public vote was required for the proposals to be approved.

== Results ==
=== Federal officials law ===
Choice	Votes	%
For	91,851	20.6
Against	353,977	79.4
Blank votes	2,984	–
Invalid votes	2,516	–
Total	451,328	100
Registered voters/turnout	657,779	68.6
Source: Nohlen & Stöver

=== Constitutional amendment (July) ===
Choice	Popular vote		Cantons		
Choice	Votes	%	Full	Half	Total
For	183,029	60.3	16	4	18
Against	120,599	39.7	3	2	4
Blank votes	15,398	–	–	–	–
Invalid votes	1,330	–	–	–	–
Total	320,356	100	19	6	22
Registered voters/turnout	641,692	49.9	–	–	–
Source: Nohlen & Stöver

=== Constitutional amendment (October) ===
Choice	Popular vote		Cantons		
Choice	Votes	%	Full	Half	Total
For	231,578	59.3	12	4	14
Against	158,615	40.7	7	2	8
Blank votes	13,400	–	–	–	–
Invalid votes	1,890	–	–	–	–
Total	405,483	100	19	6	22
Registered voters/turnout	654,372	62.0	–	–	–
Source: Nohlen & Stöver

=== Tariffs ===
Choice	Votes	%
For	220,004	58.1
Against	158,934	41.9
Blank votes	22,034	–
Invalid votes	1,840	–
Total	402,812	100
Registered voters/turnout	654,372	61.6
Source: Nohlen & Stöver

=== Central railway purchase ===
Choice	Votes	%
For	130,729	31.3
Against	289,406	68.9
Blank votes		–
Invalid votes		–
Total	420,135	100
Registered voters/turnout	653,792	
Source: Nohlen & Stöver
