= Unterer Hauenstein Pass =

Mountain pass in Switzerland

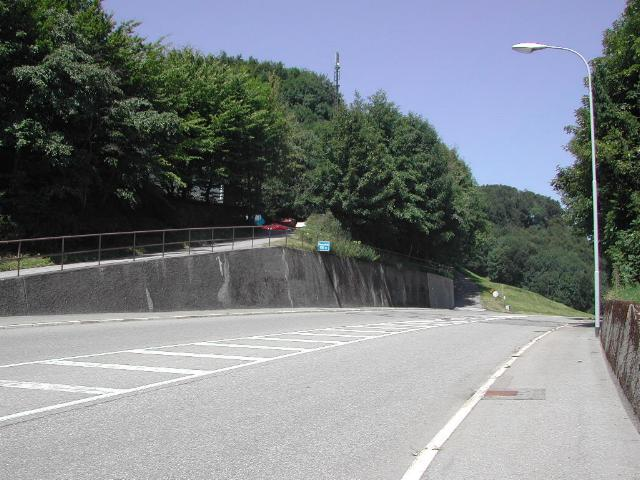
- Unterer Hauenstein Pass
- Interactive map of Unterer Hauenstein Pass
- Elevation: 691 metres (2,267 ft)

Third Approach
- Location: Switzerland
- Range: Jura Mountains
- Coordinates: 47°22′52.88″N 7°52′8.14″E

Unterer Hauenstein Pass (el. 691 m.) is a mountain pass in the Jura Mountains between the canton of Basel-Country and Solothurn in Switzerland.

It connects Buckten in Basel-Country and Trimbach in Solothurn. The pass road has a maximum grade of 6 percent.

The pass may have been used already in pre-Roman times. In 1993, Roman artifacts were discovered at the pass. It also lies close to the Roman settlement of Augusta Raurica.
