= Tarifverbund Nordwestschweiz =

The Tarifverbund Nordwestschweiz, also known by its initialisation TNW, is a Swiss public transport tariff network covering the whole of the cantons of Basel-Stadt and Basel-Landschaft, together with parts of the cantons of Aargau, Jura and Solothurn.

The TNW network offers various kinds of tickets, from single tickets to annual season tickets, which are valid on the buses, trams and trains of the operators that are members of the network. Tickets are only valid within the TNW area, and prices are based on zones, with 48 zones covering the whole of the TNW area.

One section of Baselland Transport's tram line 10 crosses through France, and this section of the route is included in the TNW network. However this does not apply to the extension of Basler Verkehrs-Betriebe's tram line 8 to Weil am Rhein in Germany. Instead, the TNW is itself a member of the triregio integrated fares network, which also covers the adjoining areas of France and Germany.

== Operators ==
The operators which make up the network are:

- Basler Verkehrs-Betriebe (BVB)
- Baselland Transport (BLT)
- Swiss Federal Railways (SBB CFF FFS)
- PostBus Switzerland
- Autobus AG Liestal (AAGL)
- Waldenburgbahn (WB)
