= Hauenstein Railway =

Railway line in Switzerland

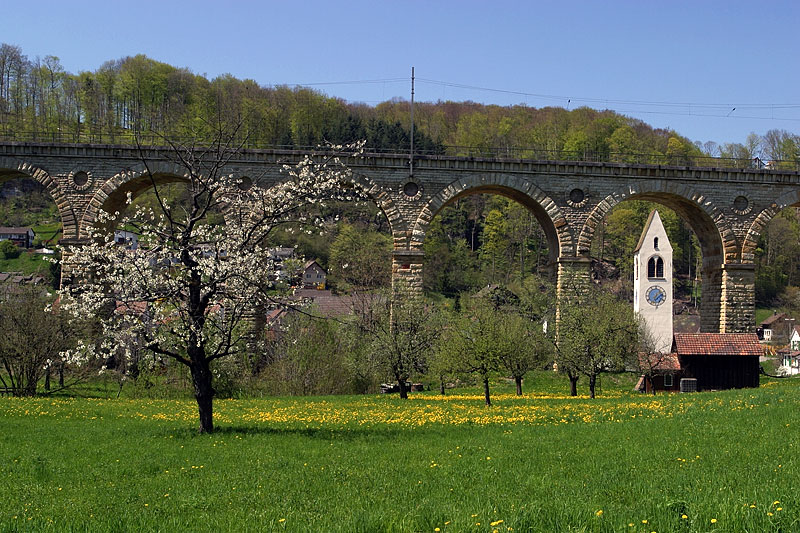
- Ruemlingen Viaduct on the old line

Overview
- Locale: Switzerland

Technical
- Track gauge: 1,435 mm (4 ft 8 1/2 in) standard gauge
- Electrification: 15 kV/16.7 Hz AC overhead catenary

The Hauenstein Railway is a major railway line in Switzerland connecting the cities of Basel and Olten.

The original line was built between 1853 and 1858 under the Unterer Hauenstein Pass, an ancient pass through the Jura Mountains, including a 2,495 m (8,186 ft) long tunnel under the village of Hauenstein. Between 1912 and 1916 a new line with an 8,134 m (5.054 mi) long base tunnel was built further east, by-passing the steeper sections of the line.

Normally long-distance trains use the base tunnel line, and the old summit line is only used by trains serving the local people (Läufelfingerli). Sometimes during disruptions inter-city trains operate on the old line, but it is reasonably fast and diverted trains take only about four minutes longer than normal services. Freight trains rarely use the summit line because of its large gradients.

== Hauenstein summit tunnel ==
The first railway in Switzerland was the extension of the French Strasbourg–Basel Railway (French: Chemin de fer de Strasbourg à Bâle) from Mulhouse to Basel, which opened to a temporary station outside Basel's walls on 15 June 1844 and to the permanent station on 11 December 1845. Despite constant discussion it was some time before this line was extended into Switzerland. In 1850 the Swiss Federal Council invited the two British engineers, Robert Stephenson and Henry Swinburne to draw up plans for a railway network for the Swiss Confederation. To connect the three main cities of the German-speaking part of the country, Zurich, Basel and Bern, the experts suggested a line to Basle along the Rhine or a tunnel under the Passwang Pass to connect with the Swiss Plateau. The Federal Council favored a line with a tunnel through the Jura via the Unterer Hauenstein Pass or the Schafmatt Pass. Both routes followed the Ergolz river to Sissach; from there a route near Läufelfingen through a Hauenstein tunnel to Olten was sought. Variations investigated included a line through Gelterkinden and from there to Tecknau or Anwil and then through a tunnel under the Schafmatt Pass to Aarau. The clear winner of these variants was the Läufelfingen line, because of its shorter tunnel and its slightly lower estimated construction cost.

=== Construction ===
The construction of the summit tunnel in 1853 by the Schweizerische Centralbahn (SCB) was a big challenge, because never before had a mountain range been penetrated in Switzerland. Nobody thought it possible that the tunnel could be driven from both sides and meet in the middle after years of work. The English contractor Thomas Brassey decided to drive the tunnel from five points—both ends and from three perpendicular shafts from the surface of the mountain to the axis of the tunnel—in order to accelerate the project.

Tools used were still fairly primitive, such as sledgehammers, chisels, pickaxes, crowbars and drill rods. Horses, men from many countries and many children were working under great danger in the tunnels and had to breathe stifling smoke and dust. The pitfalls and the geology of the complicated structure of the Jura had been underestimated. On the south side from Trimbach the drive made good progress, but on the north side problems accumulated. Although the hard limestone could be pierced, water flooded the tunnel and continually threatened to drown the workers. Since the tunnel dropped slightly from north to south, water had to be collected from the northern section and laboriously pumped by hand out of the tunnel.

=== Fire disaster ===
On 28 May 1857, a fire spread from a forge at the top of one of the shafts into the tunnel and set alight its lining boards and their supporting beams. Some workers were able to escape before the collapse of the burning rafters. A massive amount of earth fell into the tunnel and cut off 52 workers. Water was poured into the tunnel to put out the fire and an attempt was made to dig a tunnel through the rubble. When the water came into contact the very clayey debris it produced a large amount of toxic carbon monoxide. Nevertheless rescue parties pressed on, but they had to be called off when 11 rescuers died from carbon monoxide poisoning and many others lost consciousness. Attempts were made to improve air circulation, but nothing helped. On the eighth day after the accident they finally broke through. They found all 52 miners dead behind the collapsed section of the tunnel. It seemed that they had died from gas poisoning on the first day after the accident. The accident cost a total of 63 lives.

=== Operations ===
On 1 May 1858 the large project, the most difficult section of the Schweizerische Centralbahn's network, was opened with a big celebration. The route through Läufelfingen has a grade of 26.3 per thousand, one of the steepest routes of the Schweizerische Centralbahn network. It was the second line in Switzerland to be built with double track. The line needed bank engines to pull freight trains over the pass.

=== Today ===
After the construction of the base tunnel the old Hauenstein line lost traffic and in 1938 it was reduced from double to single line. In the late 1990s the line was threatened with closure. In 1997 operations were replaced by buses for a year, but since then regional trains again operate between Sissach and Olten. In 2006 was the "Läufelfingerli" was again seriously threatened by replacement with buses, but this was rejected by the parliament of the canton of Basel-Country on 16 November and funding was secured for rail services (as route S9 of Regio S-Bahn Basel) until 2009. The supporters of replacement of buses pointed out that cost recovery on the line was about 19 percent (against 63 percent in the S3 service on the Hauenstein base tunnel line or 70 to 80 percent for trams in suburbs of Basel in Basel-Country) and that the limited resources available for public transport could be more effectively used for the promotion of rail transport in the more densely populated urban areas, while buses would be more suitable for serving the villages in the Homburger valley served by the line with its rather large distances between stations. On the other hand, the advocates of maintaining rail services pointed out that buses never offered an equivalent replacement for trains (for example in terms of comfort and punctuality).

== Hauenstein base tunnel ==
During its first fifty years of operation, the trains operating over the Hauenstein line became longer and heavier and on its long climbs, freight trains required bank engines. It was expensive to carry out these complicated operations and to provide and maintain facilities for attaching and detaching locomotives at Sissach and Läufelfingen. When the Swiss Federal Railways acquired the network of the Schweizerische Centralbahn in 1901 it sought for an alternative route from Olten. In 1909 it decided to build a new line through Gelterkinden and Tecknau.

=== Construction ===
In 1912 advance work on the base tunnel through the Jura began. In four years an 8 km-long tunnel was built. During the half century since the summit tunnel was completed, tunnelling methods had fundamentally changed. Hand drills had been replaced by machines and horses had been replaced by smokeless locomotives. In addition, as a precaution, a powerful pump station was built to withstand any flooding of the tunnel. On 8 January 1916, the new line was opened. The Läufelfingen line with its summit tunnel became a side line and the Sissach–Gelterkinden Bahn tram — which had opened between Sissach and Gelterkinden on 16 May 1891 — closed.

=== Today ===
The Hauenstein base line is now one of the busiest railway lines in Switzerland. It is a part of the north-south freight axis, on which freight trains of SBB Cargo, BLS Cargo and other companies are busy, including the operation of the rolling highway between Freiburg im Breisgau and Novara for trucks up to four metres high at their corners. Passenger operations on the line consist of half-hourly or hourly (some double-deck) inter-regional and inter-city trains operate on the routes between Basel and Zurich, Bern and Lucerne. In addition, route S3 of Regio S-Bahn Basel provides a local service from Basel to Olten and on to Laufen each hour. The cross-section of the tunnel of 48 m² permits a cruising speed of 140 km/h. In the tunnel trains often cross equally fast passenger trains coming the other way and (slightly slower) freight trains.

The high traffic threatens to create a capacity bottleneck. Therefore, ways of increasing the capacity of the line are being investigated. Recently stations and signalling have been adapted to allow an increase in train frequency. The further increasing of the capacity of the line have been examined in connection with the Neuen Haupttransversale project (the upgrading of the mainline between Zurich and Bern in the 1970s), the recently completed Rail 2000 upgrade of many Swiss lines and the current NRLA project. Capacity was increased as part of Rail 2000 by the opening of a bypass of the bottleneck at Pratteln with an over 5 km-long Adler Tunnel between Liestal and Muttenz in December 2000. A continuation of this line through a third Jura tunnel, known as the Wisenberg Tunnel, between Liestal or Sissach and Olten is currently being debated; it would have connections to the line to Aarau and Zurich and to the line to Olten and Bern. So far, finance has not been found for this project.
