= Jean-Marie Zoellé =

French politician (1944–2020)

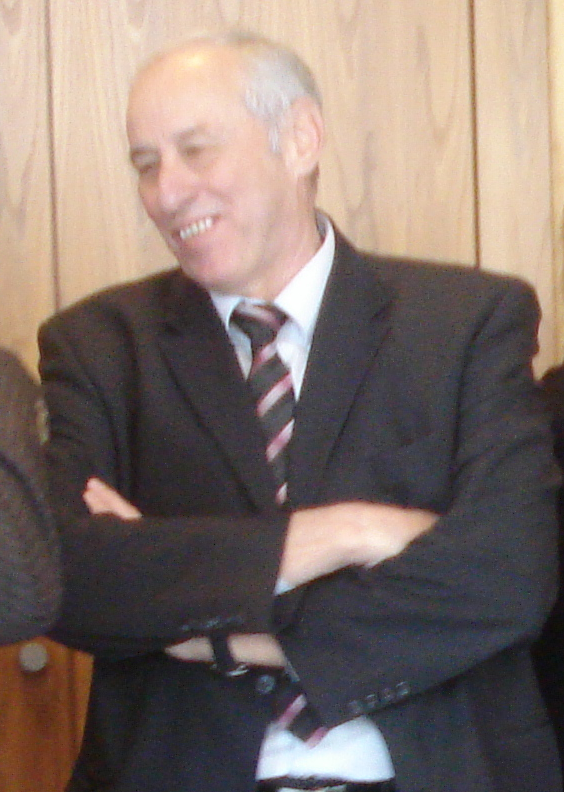
- Jean-Marie Zoellé in 2010

Mayor of Saint-Louis
- In office 2011 – 6 April 2020
- Preceded by: Jean Ueberschlag
- Succeeded by: Jean-Marc Deichtmann

Personal details
- Born: November 16, 1944 (age 81) Sierentz, France
- Died: April 6, 2020 (aged 75) Bonn, Germany
- Party: Miscellaneous right
- Occupation: Politician

Jean-Marie Zoellé (Sierentz, 16 November 1944 – Bonn, 6 April 2020) was a French politician, mayor of Saint-Louis, Haut-Rhin from 2011 until his death in office in 2020.

== Career ==
Zoellé was appointed deputy mayor in 1989, under the direction of Jean Ueberschlag, the mayor of Saint-Louis. He kept this role until 2011, when Ueberschlag resigned and he was elected mayor.

In the 2014 Municipal Elections, he was reinstated in the next round with 79.91% of the vote in the first round, then topped a miscellaneous right list. This was the best score for a town of 20,000 or more inhabitants in Alsace.

On 15 March 2020, Zoellé was re-elected in the municipal elections with 84.03% of the votes cast in the first round, with a turnout of 24.09%. Zoellé then described the decision to hold the local elections as an error in view of the worsening COVID-19 outbreak in France, stating that he would have preferred a postponement till October 2020.

Shortly thereafter, Zoellé fell ill with COVID and was then hospitalized in Mulhouse due to respiratory failure. On March 28, he was transferred to St Petrus Hospital in Bonn, Germany. He died there on 6 April, aged 75. Other local elected officials in the city have also died of the same illness. He was buried on 14 April 2020.
