= Lycée Jean Mermoz =

Lycée Jean Mermoz may refer to:

Schools in France:

- Lycée Jean-Mermoz (Montpellier) in Montpellier
- Lycée Jean Mermoz (Saint-Louis) in Saint-Louis, Haut-Rhin

Schools outside France:

- Lycée Franco-Argentin Jean Mermoz
- Lycée franco-chilien "Alliance Française" Jean-Mermoz, Curico, Chile
- Jean-Mermoz International School (Ivory Coast)
- Lycée Jean Mermoz (Senegal)
- Lycée Français Jean Mermoz (Dubai), in Al Quoz, Dubai, United Arab Emirates
