= Saint-Louis–Huningue railway =

Overview
- Owner: EL (1878–1919); AL (not serviced) (1919–1937); SNCF (1938–1997); RFF (1997–2014); SNCF (since 2015)
- Line number: 136 000
- Locale: Haut-Rhin
- Termini: Saint-Louis station; Huningue

Service
- Services: Freight
- Operator(s): SNCF

History
- Opened: 11 February 1878

Technical
- Line length: 2.94 km (1.83 mi)
- Number of tracks: Single track
- Track gauge: 1,435 mm (4 ft 8 1/2 in) standard gauge
- Electrification: None

The railway line between Saint-Louis and Huningue (French: Ligne de Saint-Louis à Huningue) is a French 3 km long railway located in the Haut-Rhin department of the Grand Est. The line runs between the communes of Saint-Louis and Huningue. As of 2020, the line is closed to passenger service but is still used by freight trains.

It consists of line number 136 000 of the réseau ferré national.

In the old nomenclature of the east region of the SNCF, the line was amalgamated with the Waldighoffen–Saint-Louis-La Chaussée railway. As a result, it was numbered 31.8 and referred to as the Blotzheim–Huningue railway.

== History ==
The Saint-Louis au Rhin railway was opened on 11 February 1878 and was prolonged along the Rhine river to Weil am Rhein. Envisioned since the early 1870s, the line responded to a military need as it allowed for the rapid deployment of military personnel towards the Sundgau.

Due to limited demand for passenger and freight service, the railway bridge in Huningue across the Rhine was removed in 1937. The line was subsequently closed to passenger services on 31 December 1945. A SNCF train schedule in 2019 indicated that the station in Huningue include an industrial spur.
