= Jean Ueberschlag =

French politician

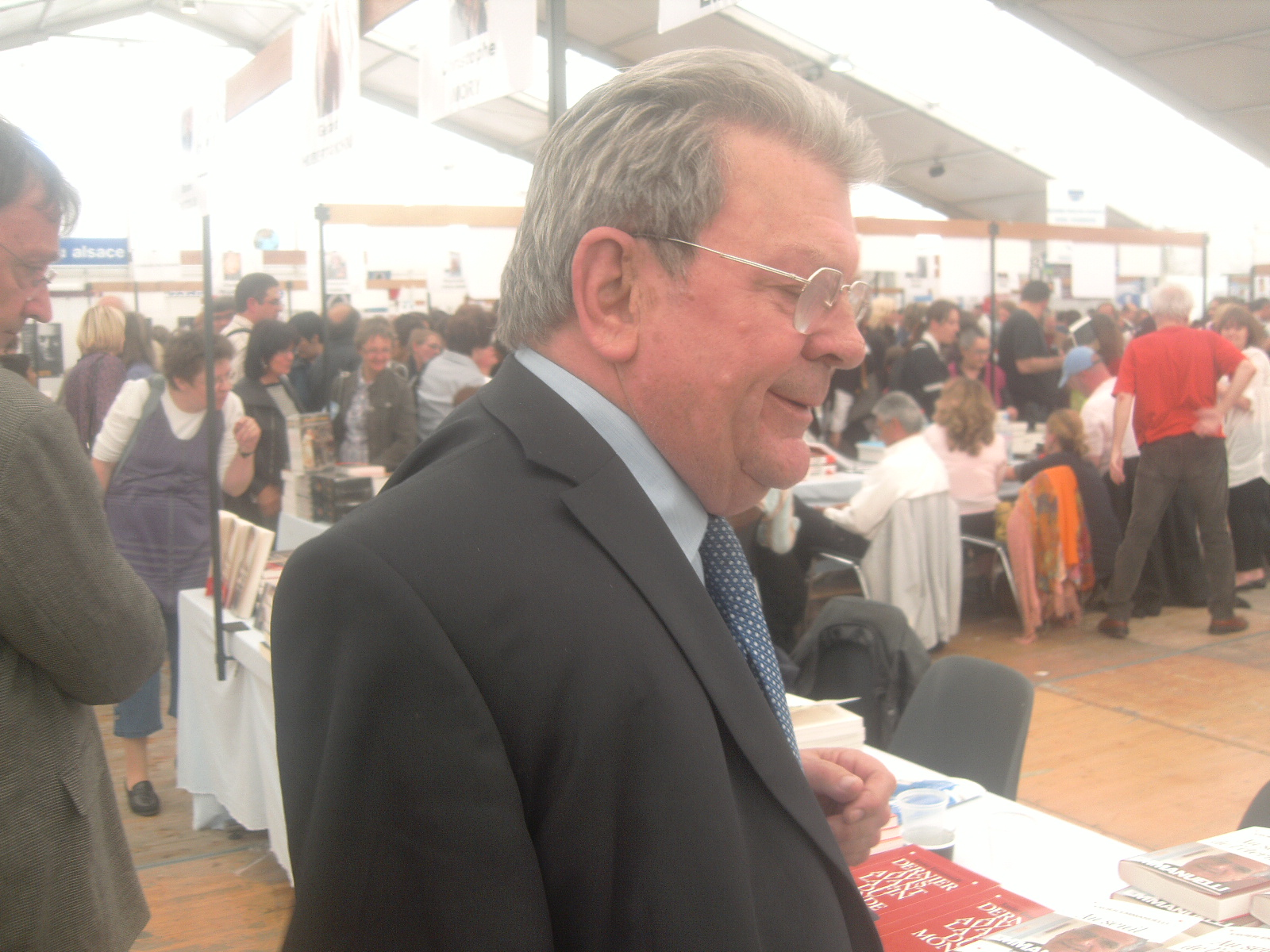
Jean Ueberschlag in 2010.

Jean Ueberschlag (born 29 May 1935 in Folgensbourg, Haut-Rhin) was a member of the National Assembly of France between 1986 and 2012. He represented the Haut-Rhin department, and was a member of the Union for a Popular Movement. He was the mayor of Saint-Louis (Haut-Rhin) from 1989 to September 2011.
