= Basel St. Johann railway station =

Railway station in Switzerland

Basel St. Johann
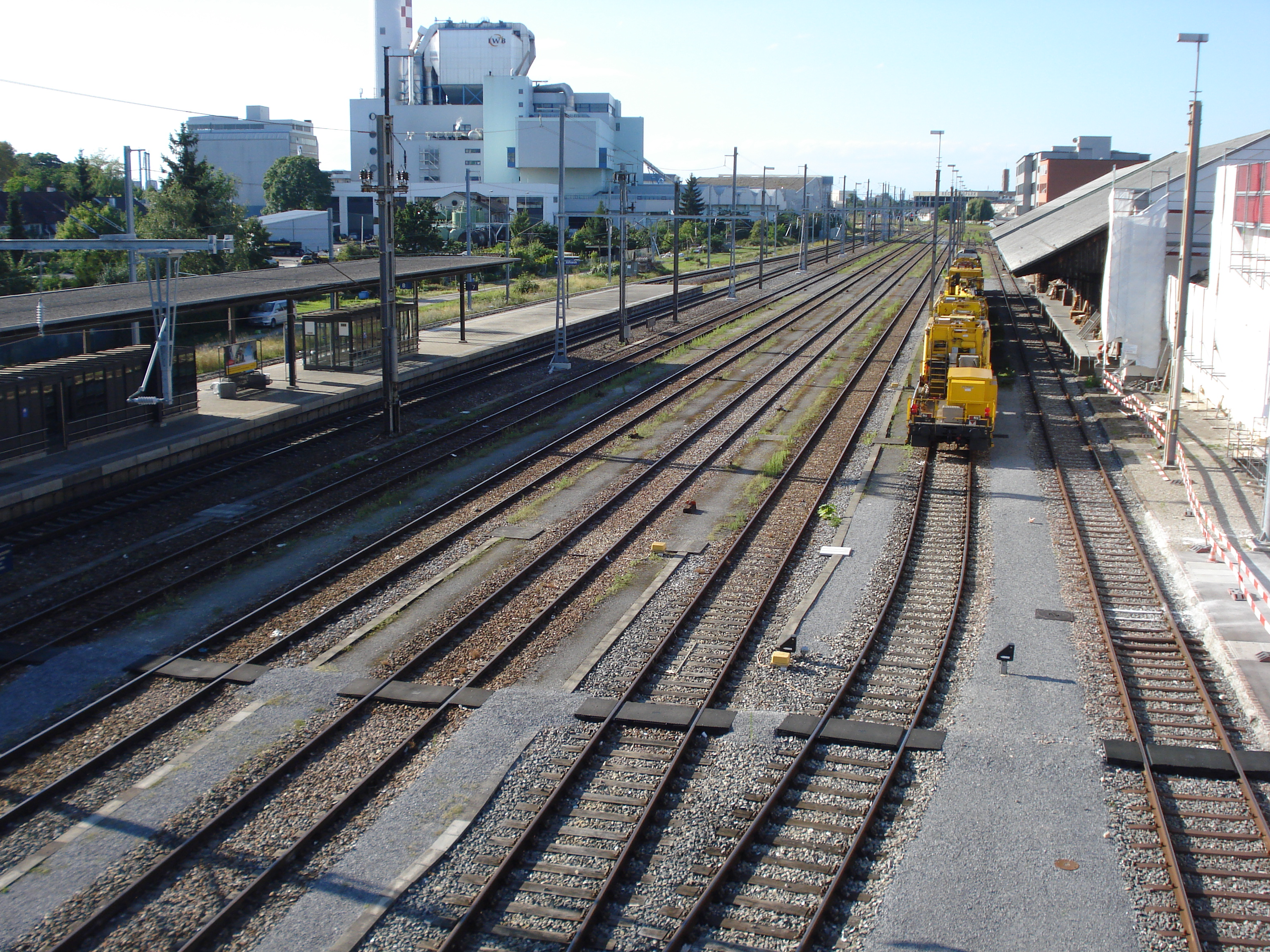
- The station platform in 2010

General information
- Location: Vogesenplatz; Basel; Switzerland
- Coordinates: 47°34′13″N 7°34′21″E
- Owner: Swiss Federal Railways
- Line: Strasbourg–Basel line
- Distance: 137.8 km (85.6 mi) from Strasbourg-Ville
- Train operators: Swiss Federal Railways
- Connections: Trams: 1, 21; Basler Verkehrs-Betriebe buses

Other information
- Fare zone: 10 (tnw)

Passengers
- 2018: 90 per weekday

Services
Preceding station	Basel S-Bahn	Following station
Saint-Louis towards Mulhouse Ville	TER	Basel SBB Terminus
Location
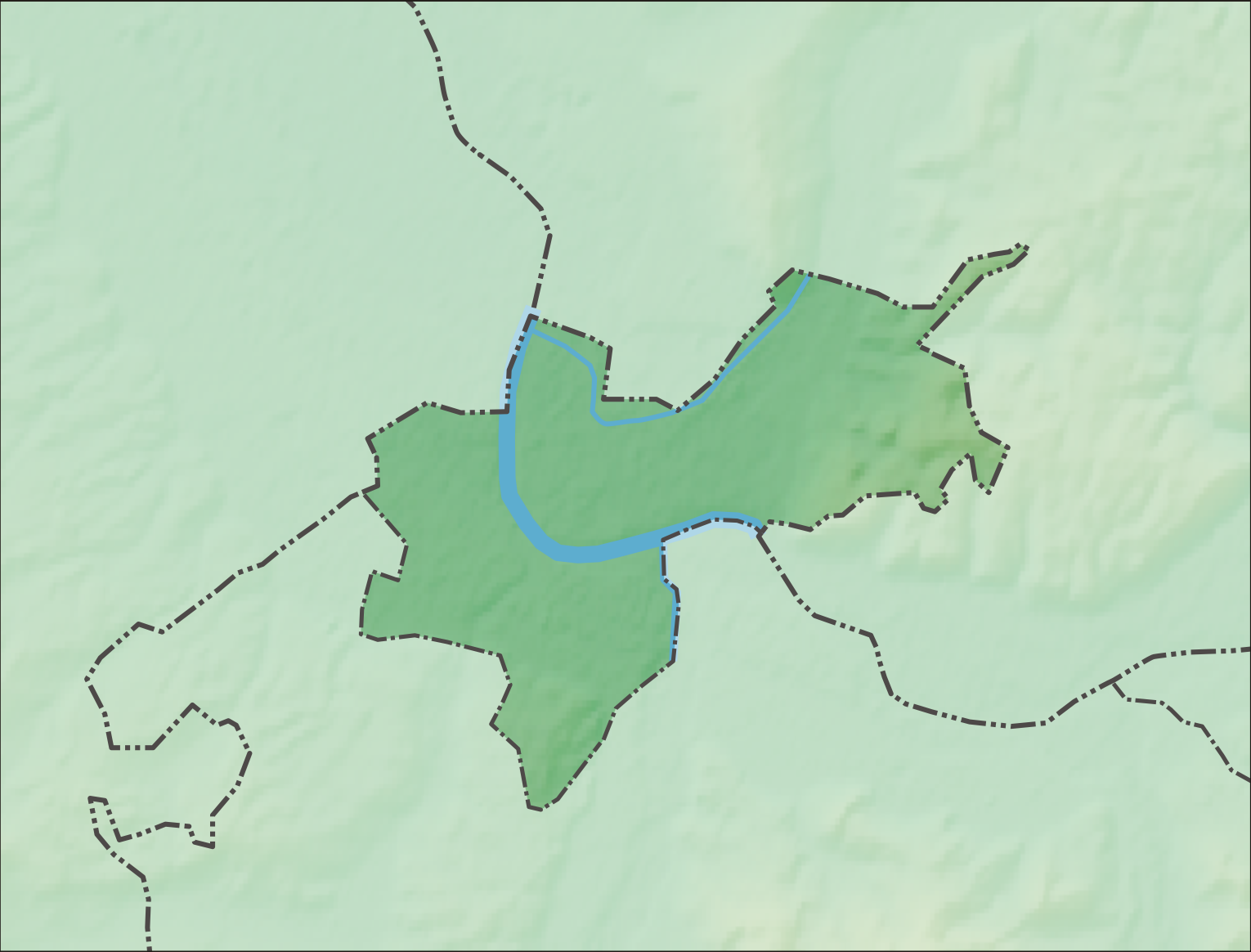
- Location within Switzerland Location within Canton of Basel-Stadt

Basel St. Johann railway station (German: Bahnhof Basel St. Johann, French: Gare de Bâle-Saint-Jean) is a railway station in inner-city Basel, Switzerland. It is an intermediate stop on the standard gauge Strasbourg–Basel line of SNCF.

== Services ==
The following services stop at Basel St. Johann:

- Basel S-Bahn TER: hourly or better service between Mulhouse and Basel SBB.
