= Knœringue =

Commune in Grand Est, France

Knœringue Knehrige
- Commune
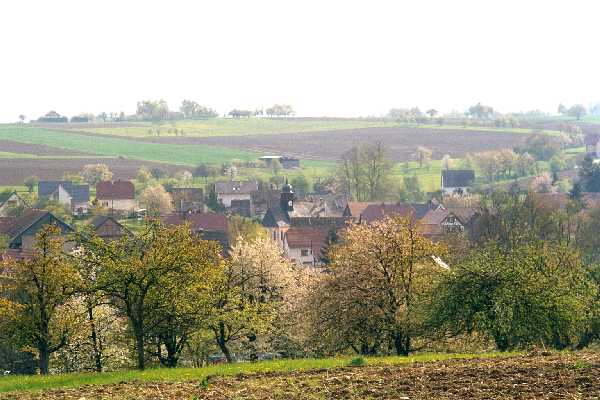
- A general view of Knoeringue

- Coat of arms
- Location of Knœringue
- Location within France Location within Grand Est
- Coordinates: 47°33′50″N 7°24′12″E
- Country: France
- Region: Grand Est
- Department: Haut-Rhin
- Arrondissement: Mulhouse
- Canton: Saint-Louis
- Intercommunality: Saint-Louis Agglomération

Government
  - Mayor (2020–2026): André Ueberschlag
- Area^{1}: 4.68 km^{2} (1.81 sq mi)
- Elevation: 405 m (1,329 ft)
- Highest elevation: 452 m (1,483 ft)
- Lowest elevation: 382 m (1,253 ft)
- Population (2023): 381
  - Density: 81.4/km^{2} (211/sq mi)
- Time zone: UTC+01:00 (CET)
  - Summer (DST): UTC+02:00 (CEST)
- INSEE/Postal code: 68168 /68220
- ^{1} French Land Register data, which excludes lakes, ponds, glaciers > 1 km^{2} (0.386 sq mi or 247 acres) and river estuaries.

Knœringue (French pronunciation: [knœʁɛ̃ɡ]; Alemannic German: Knehrige; German: Knöringen) is a commune in the Haut-Rhin department in Alsace in north-eastern France.

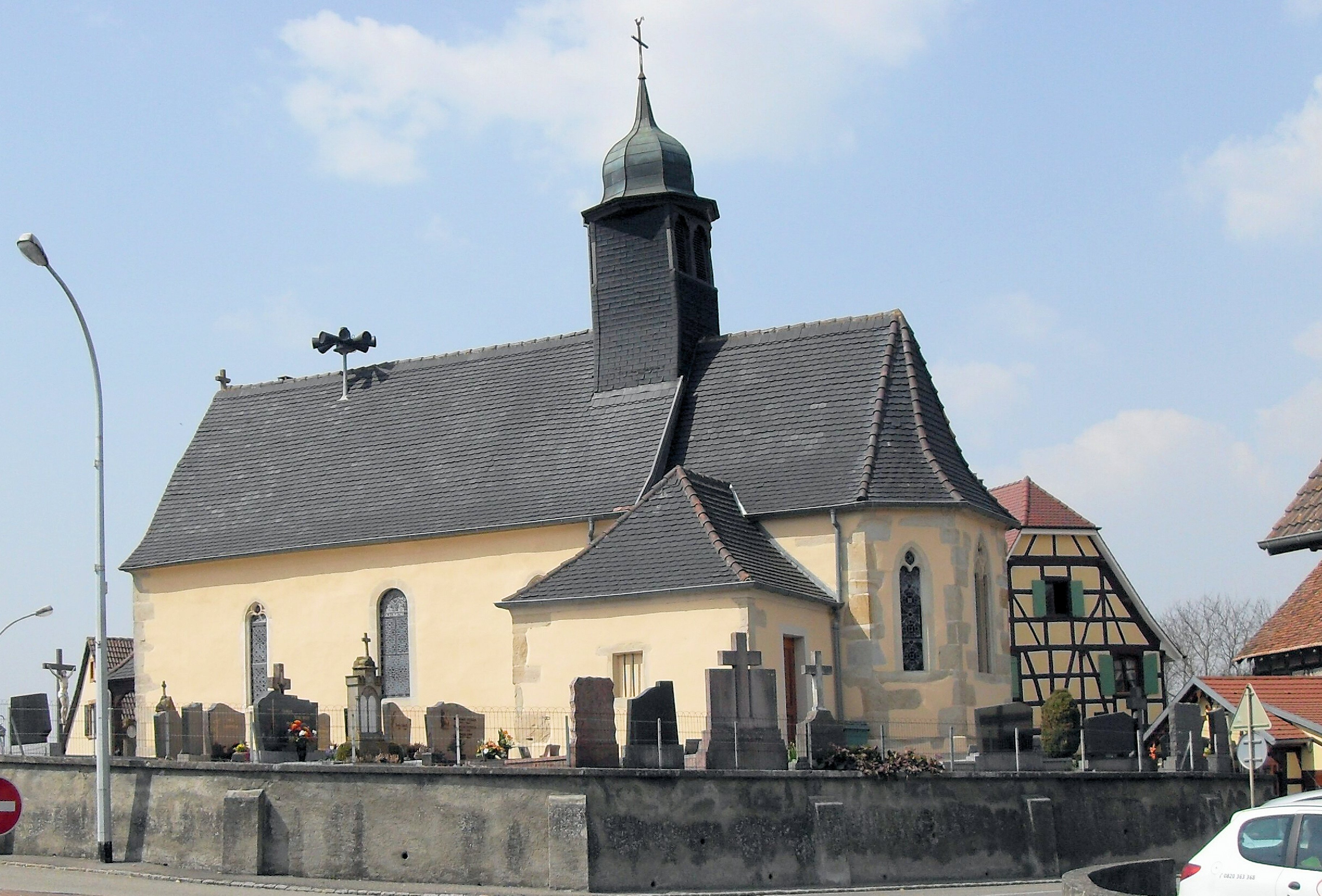
Church of Saint Jacob the Elder

== See also ==
- Communes of the Haut-Rhin département
