= Hésingue =

Commune in Grand Est, France

Hésingue Häsige
- Commune
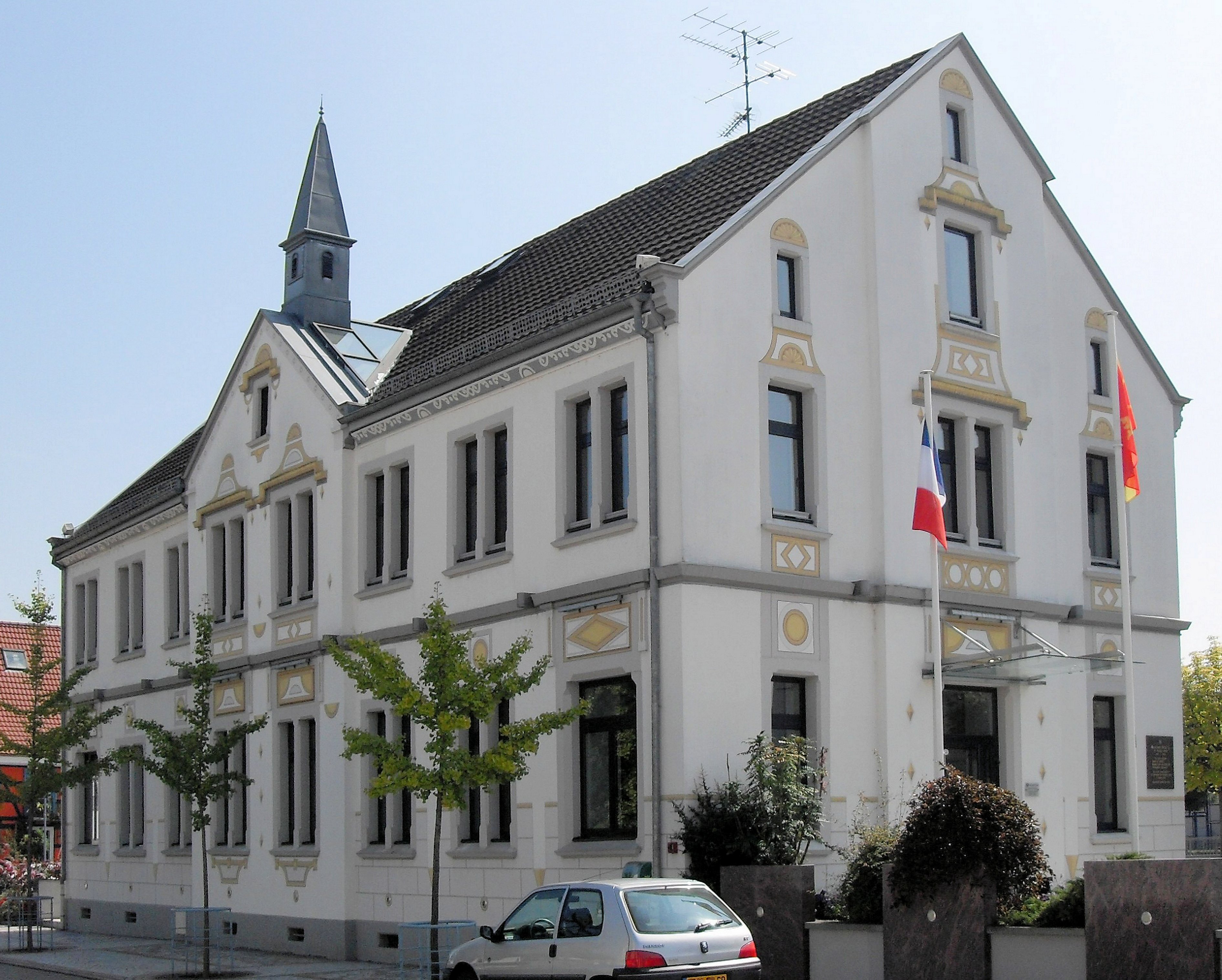
- The town hall in Hésingue

- Coat of arms
- Location of Hésingue
- Location within France Location within Grand Est
- Coordinates: 47°34′34″N 7°31′17″E
- Country: France
- Region: Grand Est
- Department: Haut-Rhin
- Arrondissement: Mulhouse
- Canton: Saint-Louis
- Intercommunality: Saint-Louis Agglomération

Government
  - Mayor (2020–2026): Gaston Latscha
- Area^{1}: 9.14 km^{2} (3.53 sq mi)
- Highest elevation: 343 m (1,125 ft)
- Lowest elevation: 248 m (814 ft)
- Population (2023): 2,972
  - Density: 325/km^{2} (842/sq mi)
- Time zone: UTC+01:00 (CET)
  - Summer (DST): UTC+02:00 (CEST)
- INSEE/Postal code: 68135 /68220
- Dialling codes: 0389
- ^{1} French Land Register data, which excludes lakes, ponds, glaciers > 1 km^{2} (0.386 sq mi or 247 acres) and river estuaries.

Hésingue (French pronunciation: [ezɛ̃ɡ]; German: Häsingen; Alsatian: Häsige) is a commune in the Haut-Rhin department in Alsace in north-eastern France. It is close to both the Swiss and German borders, and is around 6 kilometres (3.7 mi) from the centre of Basel.

== Population ==
Historical population
Year	Pop.	±% p.a.
1968	1,499	—
1975	1,657	+1.44%
1982	1,632	−0.22%
1990	1,713	+0.61%
1999	1,921	+1.28%
2007	2,370	+2.66%
2012	2,541	+1.40%
2017	2,719	+1.36%
2023	2,972	+1.49%
Source: INSEE

== Gallery ==
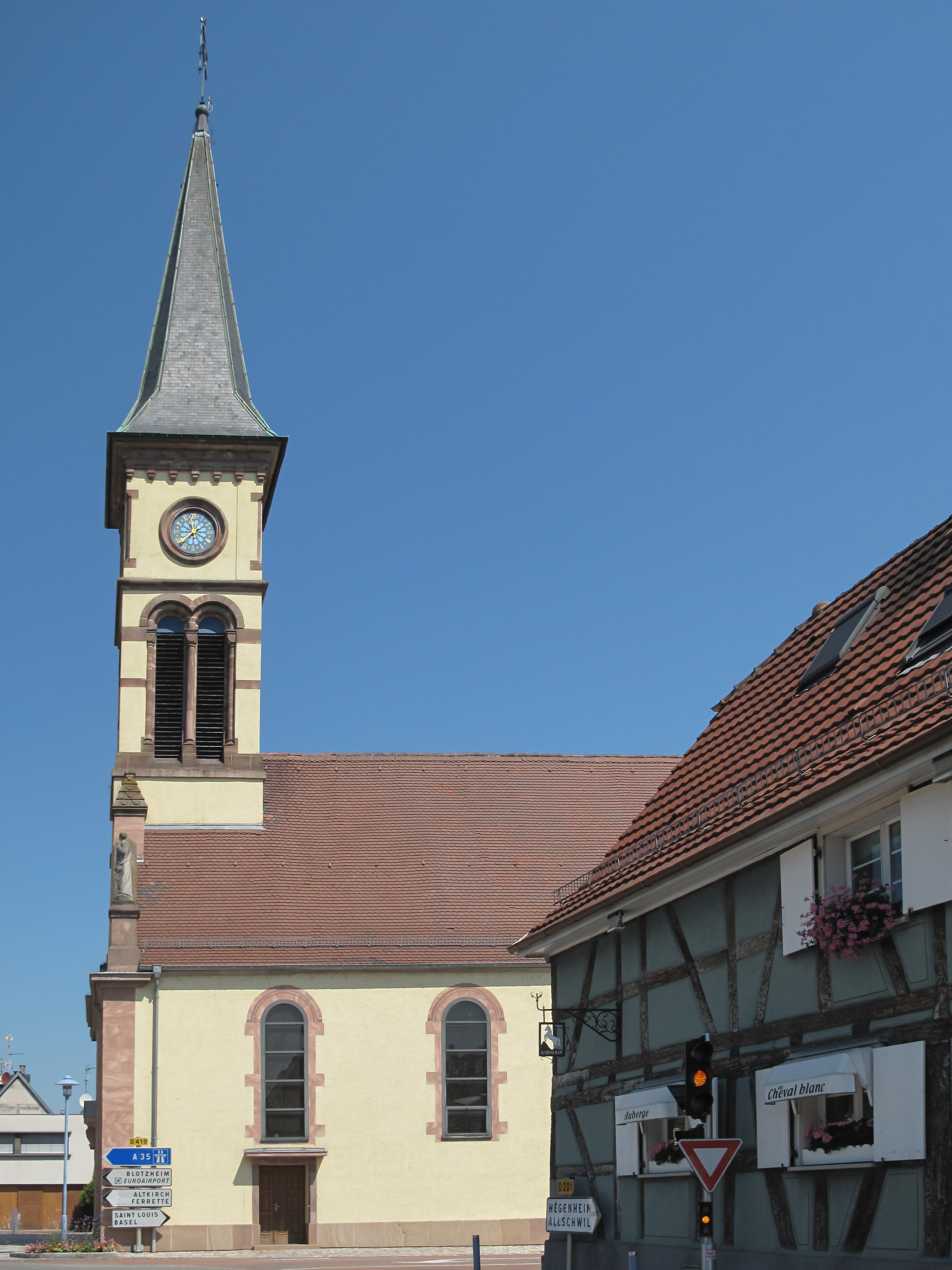
Saint-Laurent (l'église Saint-Laurent)

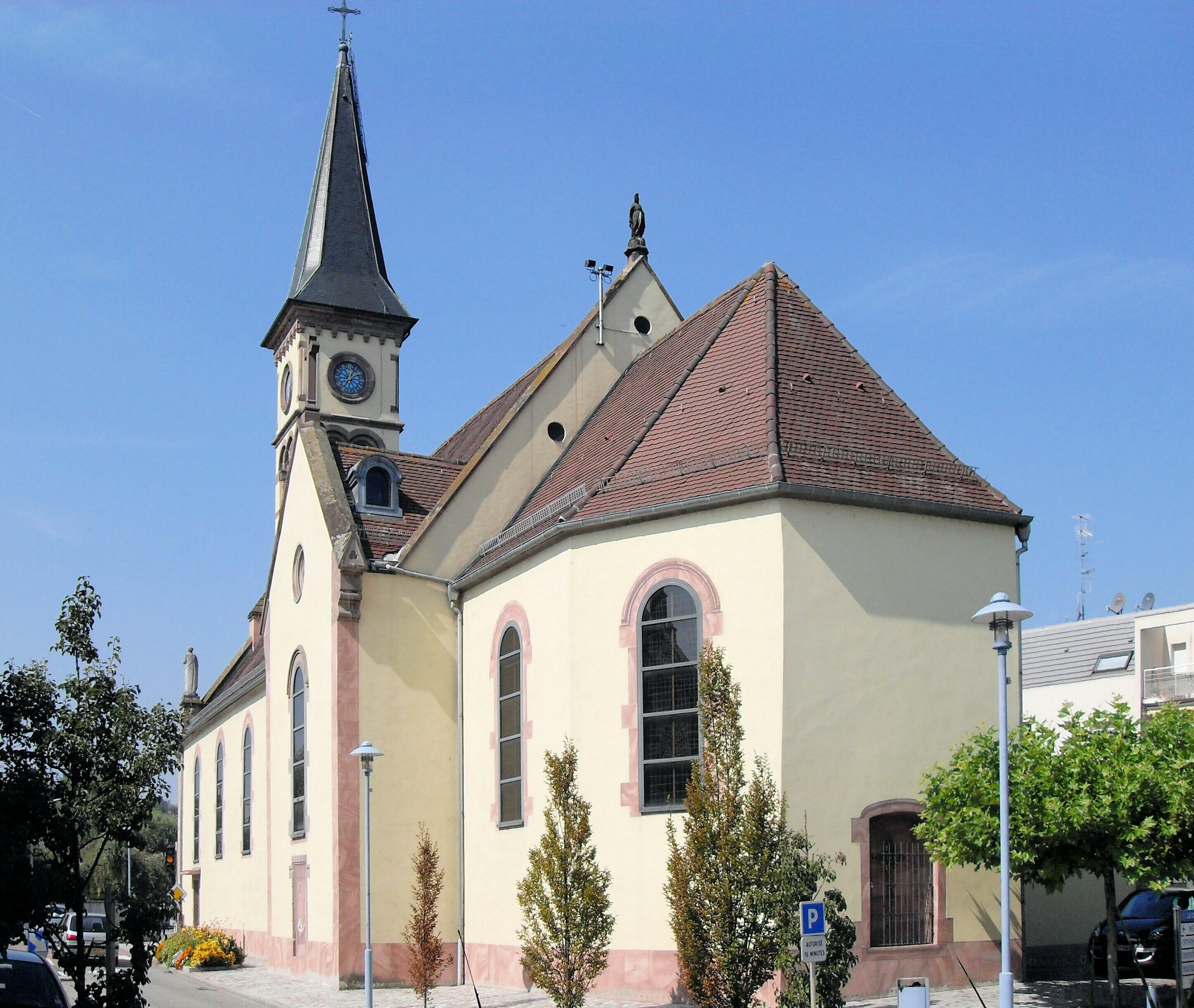
Saint-Laurent Church, east side

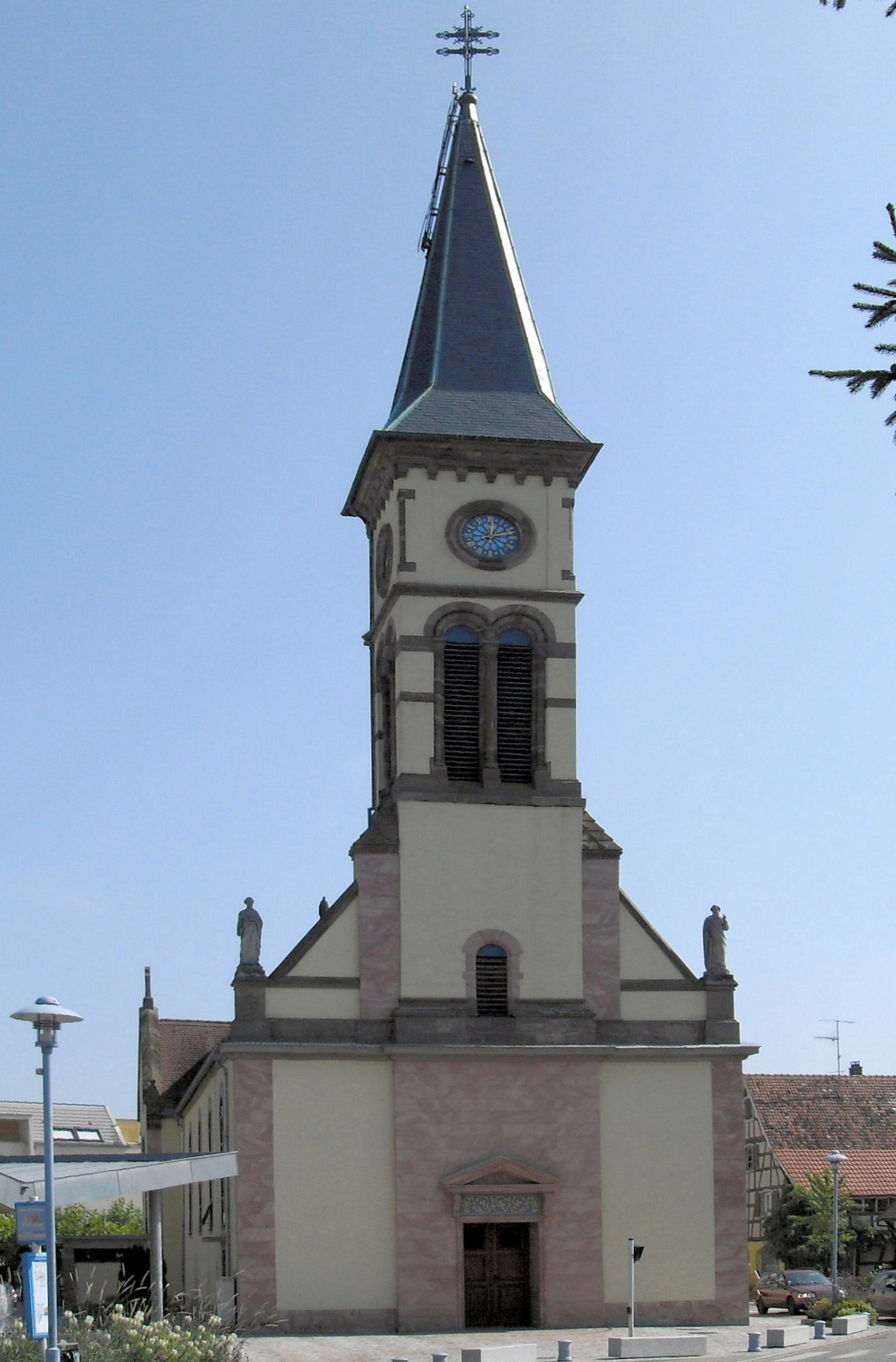
Saint-Laurent Church, west side

== See also ==
- Communes of the Haut-Rhin département
