= Hôtel de Ville, Saint-Louis, Haut-Rhin =

Town hall in Saint-Louis, Haut-Rhin, France

Hôtel de Ville
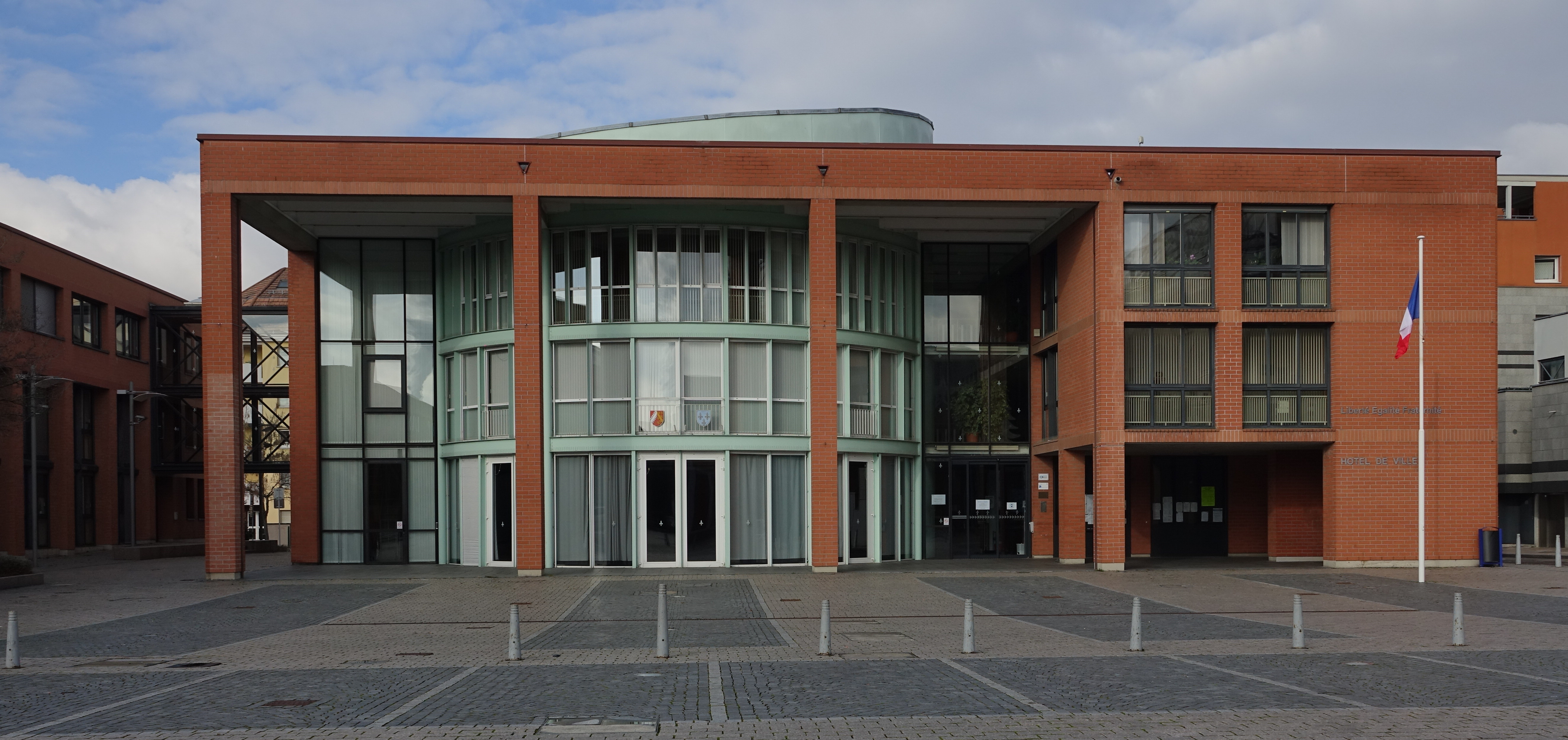
- The main frontage of the Hôtel de Ville in January 2022
- Interactive map of the Hôtel de Ville area

General information
- Type: City hall
- Architectural style: Modern style
- Location: Saint-Louis, France
- Coordinates: 47.5860°N 7.5611°E
- Completed: 1989

The Hôtel de Ville (French pronunciation: [otɛl də vil], City Hall) is a municipal building in Saint-Louis, Haut-Rhin, in eastern France, standing on Rue Théo Bachmann.

== History ==
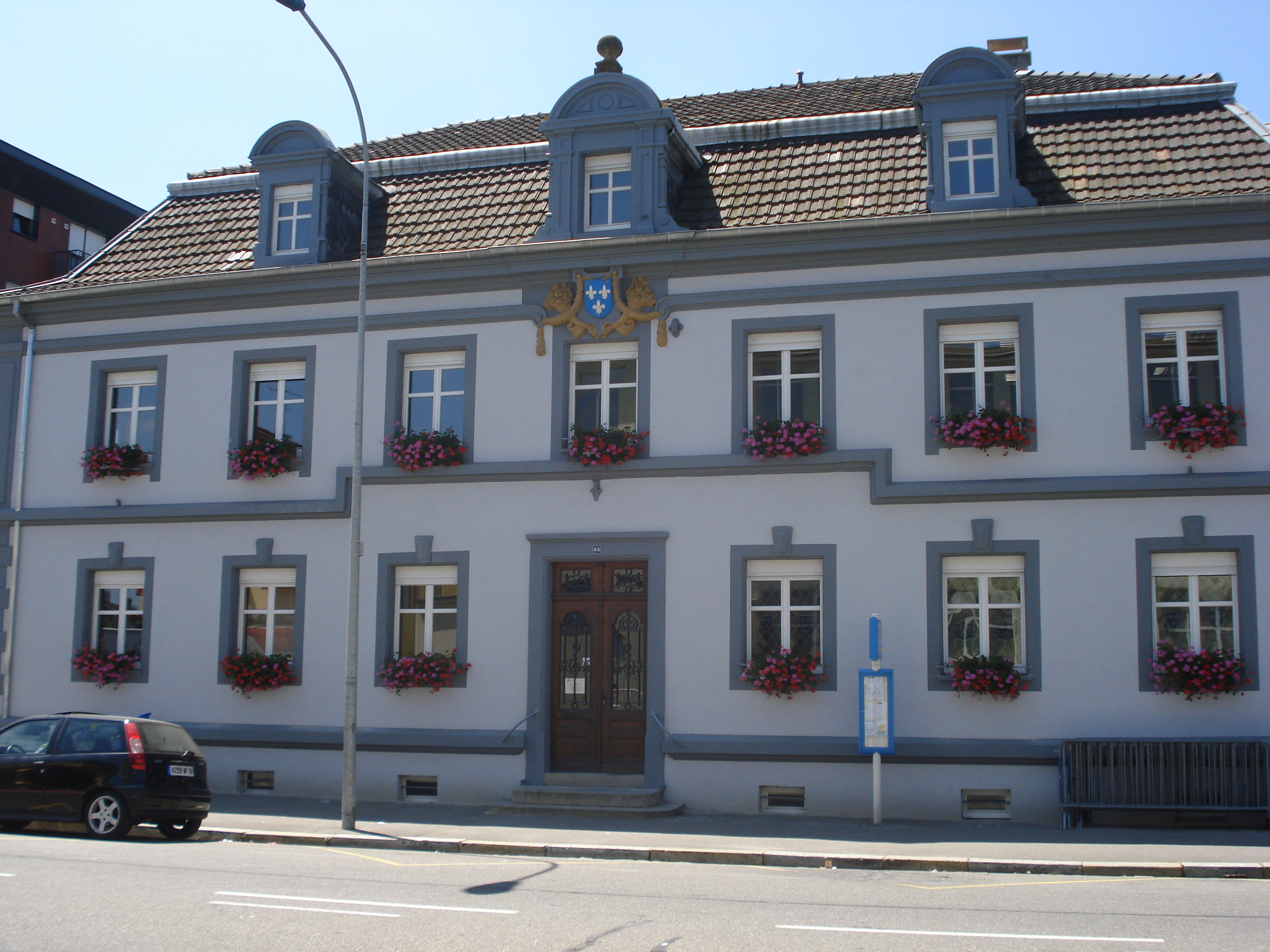
The old town hall

After the French Revolution, the new town council initially held their meetings in the home of the mayor at the time. This arrangement continued until 1862, when the council led by the mayor, Octave Vogelsberger, decided to acquire a dedicated town hall. The building they selected was No. 44 Rue de Mulhouse. The building was designed in the neoclassical style, built in brick with a cement render finish and was probably completed earlier in the 19th century.

The design involved a symmetrical main frontage of seven bays facing onto Rue de Mulhouse. The central bay featured a square-headed doorway with a stone surround and a cornice on the ground floor, and a cross-window with a stone surround surmounted by a shield with garlands on the first floor. The other bays were fenestrated by cross-windows on both floors. At roof level, there were three dormer windows built into the hipped roof. After the building was no longer required for municipal use, it became a nursing school, the Institut de formation du Diaconat.

At the start of the Second World War, the council staff, together with the rest of the population of the town, were evacuated to Lectoure in the south of France. While local people were allowed to return in September 1940, the town was only liberated by the French 1st Army on 20 November 1944.

In the early 1980s, following significant population growth, the council led by the mayor, Théo Bachmann, decided to commission a modern town hall. The new building was designed in the modern style, built in red brick and glass and was completed in 1989.

The design involved an asymmetrical main frontage of four bays facing across the square towards Avenue du Général de Gaulle. The first three bays were recessed with full-height brick piers supporting a flat roof. Within the recessed area, a three-storey semi-circular structure contained the main entrance at ground floor level. The right-hand bay was recessed on the ground floor and was fenestrated by pairs of casement windows on the first and second floors. Internally, the principal room was the Salle du Conseil (council chamber) which was accommodated within the upper floors of the semi-circular structure visible from outside.

A major programme of works to landscape the area in front of the town hall, to plant trees and to install water jets was instigated in May 2025. The new square was opened by the mayor, Stéphanie Gerteis, on 26 June 2026.
