= Canton of Saint-Louis, Haut-Rhin =

Canton in France

Coordinates: 47.59°N 7.56°E

The canton of Saint-Louis is an administrative division of the Haut-Rhin department, northeastern France. It was created at the French canton reorganisation which came into effect in March 2015. Its seat is in Saint-Louis.

It consists of the following communes:

1. Attenschwiller
2. Blotzheim
3. Buschwiller
4. Folgensbourg
5. Hagenthal-le-Bas
6. Hagenthal-le-Haut
7. Hégenheim
8. Hésingue
9. Huningue
10. Knœringue
11. Leymen
12. Liebenswiller
13. Michelbach-le-Bas
14. Michelbach-le-Haut
15. Neuwiller
16. Ranspach-le-Bas
17. Ranspach-le-Haut
18. Rosenau
19. Saint-Louis
20. Village-Neuf
21. Wentzwiller
