= Rosenau, Haut-Rhin =

Commune in Grand Est, France

Rosenau
- Commune
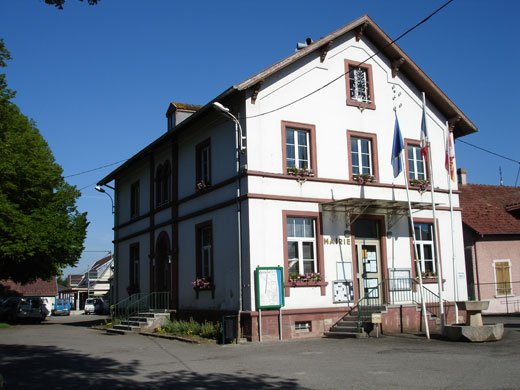
- The town hall in Rosenau

- Coat of arms
- Location of Rosenau
- Location within France Location within Grand Est
- Coordinates: 47°38′16″N 7°32′11″E
- Country: France
- Region: Grand Est
- Department: Haut-Rhin
- Arrondissement: Mulhouse
- Canton: Saint-Louis
- Intercommunality: Saint-Louis Agglomération

Government
  - Mayor (2020–2026): Valérie Vonarx
- Area^{1}: 6.47 km^{2} (2.50 sq mi)
- Elevation: 241 m (791 ft)
- Highest elevation: 247 m (810 ft)
- Lowest elevation: 226 m (741 ft)
- Population (2023): 2,396
  - Density: 370/km^{2} (959/sq mi)
- Time zone: UTC+01:00 (CET)
  - Summer (DST): UTC+02:00 (CEST)
- INSEE/Postal code: 68286 /68128
- ^{1} French Land Register data, which excludes lakes, ponds, glaciers > 1 km^{2} (0.386 sq mi or 247 acres) and river estuaries.

Rosenau (French pronunciation: [ʁozno] or French pronunciation: [ʁozənau]; Alsatian: Rosenöi) is a commune in the Haut-Rhin department in Alsace in north-eastern France.

== Geography ==
Nearby cities and towns of the commune are Saint-Louis, Bartenheim, Blotzheim and Buschwiller

== History ==
in 1932 the first hydroelectric power station between the boundaries of Rosenau and Kemps was commissioned by President Lebrun

On 19 November 1944, French Lieutenant Jean de Loisy's tank detachment arrived at the Rhine in Rosenau was the first army to arrive at the Rhine at Rosenau.

== Population ==
Historical population
| Year | Pop. | ±% p.a. |
|---|---|---|
| 1968 | 673 | — |
| 1975 | 1,031 | +6.28% |
| 1982 | 1,591 | +6.39% |
| 1990 | 1,501 | −0.73% |
| 1999 | 1,840 | +2.29% |
| 2007 | 1,988 | +0.97% |
| 2012 | 2,223 | +2.26% |
| 2017 | 2,374 | +1.32% |
| 2023 | 2,396 | +0.15% |
Source: INSEE

== See also ==
- Communes of the Haut-Rhin department
