= Bartenheim station =

Railway station in Bartenheim, France

Bartenheim
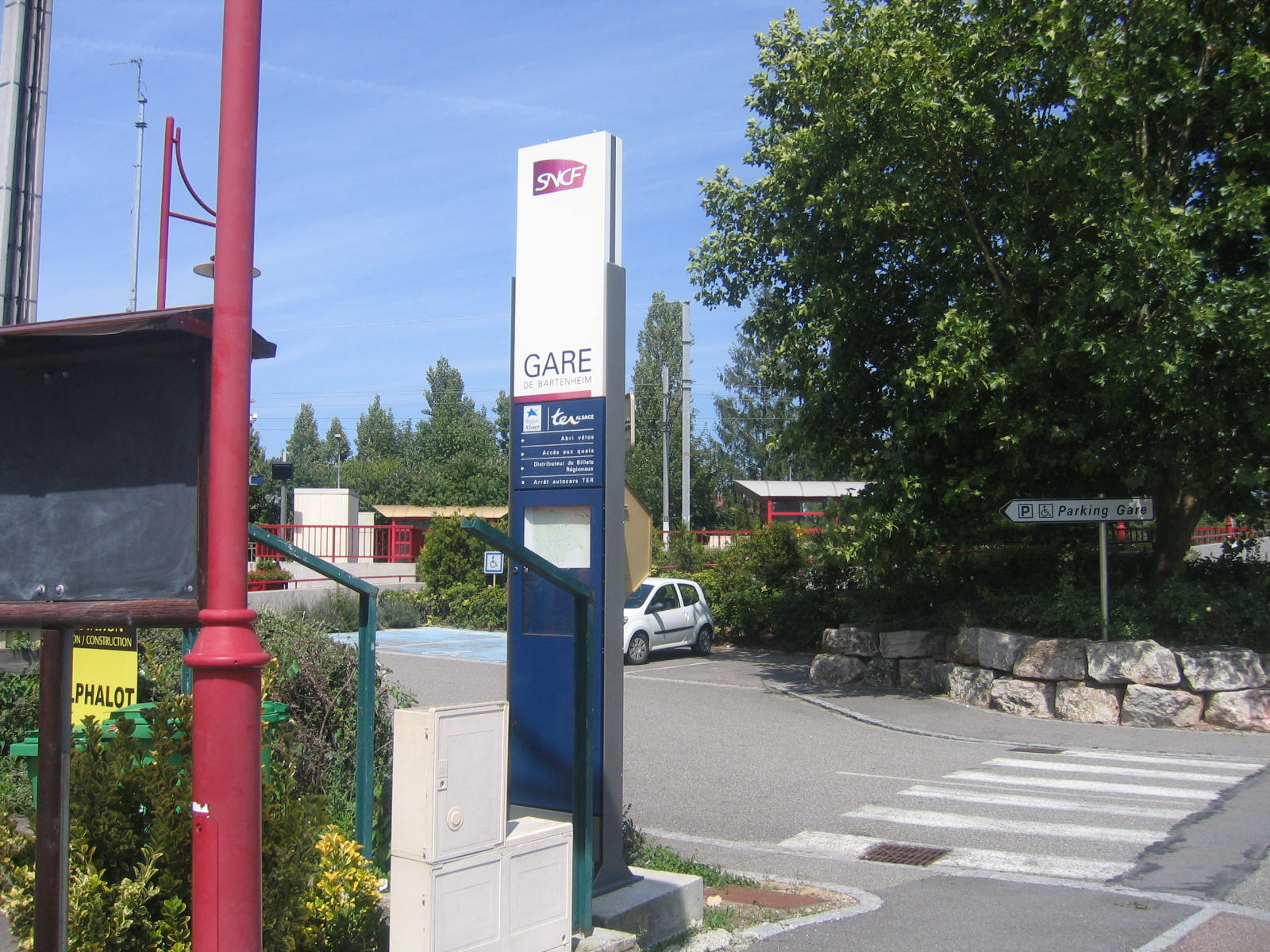
- Bartenheim station entrance

General information
- Location: Rue de la Gare; 68870 Bartenheim; Haut-Rhin; France
- Coordinates: 47.634875°N 7.487556°E
- Owner: SNCF
- Operator: SNCF
- Line: Strasbourg–Basel railway

Other information
- Station code: 87182113

Services
| Preceding station | TER Grand Est | Following station |
|---|---|---|
| Sierentz towards Mulhouse | A15 | Saint-Louis-la-Chaussée towards Basel SNCF |
Location

Bartenheim station (French: Gare de Bartenheim) is a railway station on the Strasbourg–Basel railway serving the commuter town of Bartenheim, Alsace, France. The station is served by regional trains to Mulhouse and Basel.
