= Sierentz station =

French railway station

Sierentz
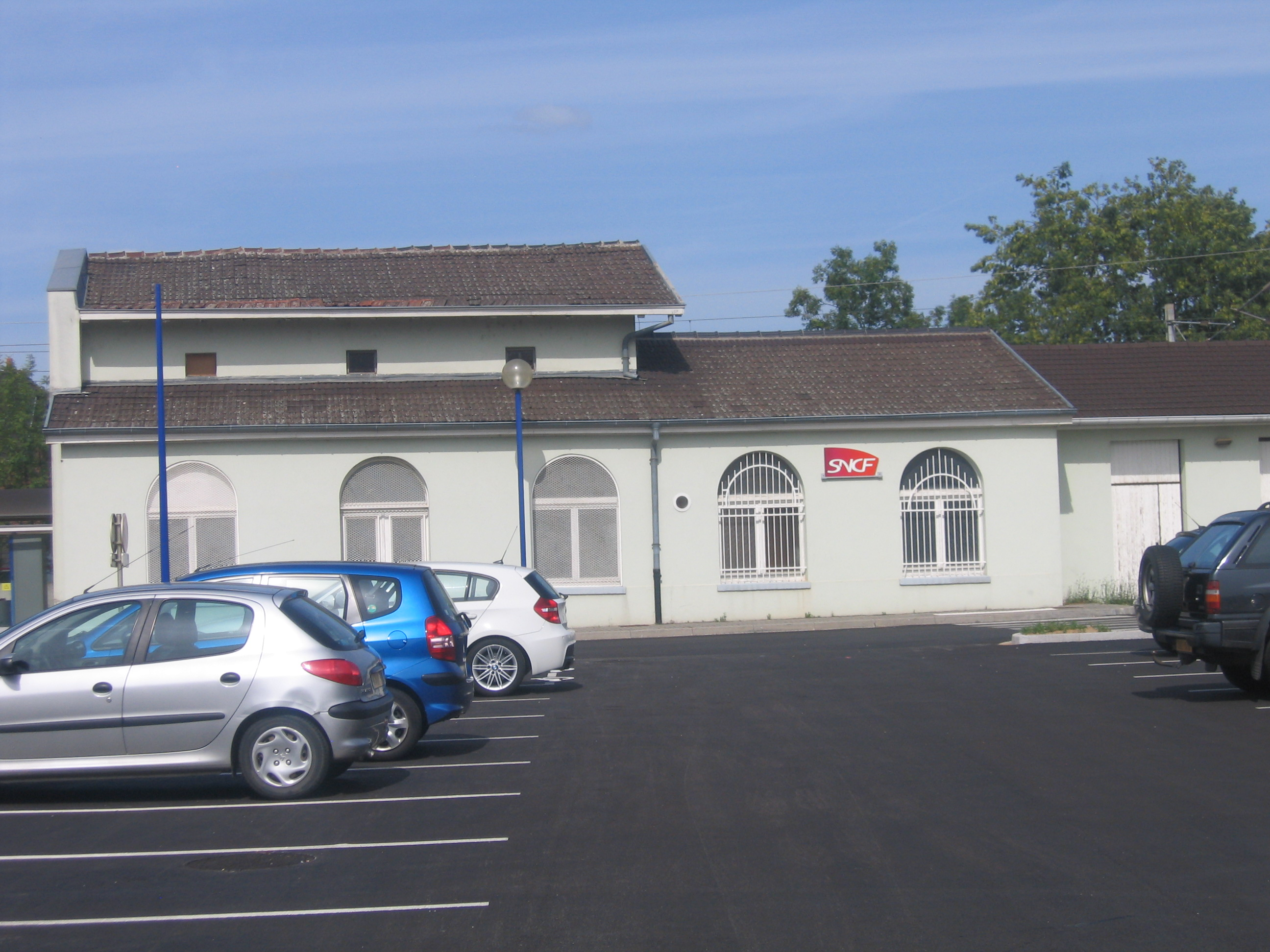
- Sierentz station

General information
- Location: Rue De Lattre de Tassigny; 68510 Sierentz; Haut-Rhin, France
- Coordinates: 47.655686°N 7.45874°E
- Owner: SNCF
- Operator: SNCF
- Line: Strasbourg–Basel railway

Other information
- Station code: 87182105

History
- Opened: 1840; 186 years ago

Services
| Preceding station | TER Grand Est | Following station |
|---|---|---|
| Habsheim towards Mulhouse | A15 | Bartenheim towards Basel SNCF |
Location

Sierentz station (French: Gare de Sierentz) is a French railway station serving the commuter town of Sierentz, Haut-Rhin. The station is located between the cities of Mulhouse and Basel.

Opened in 1840 by the Compagnie du chemin de fer de Strasbourg à Bâle, the railway station is a stop on the SNCF national network. The station is served by TER Grand Est trains between Mulhouse and Basel SBB.

== History ==
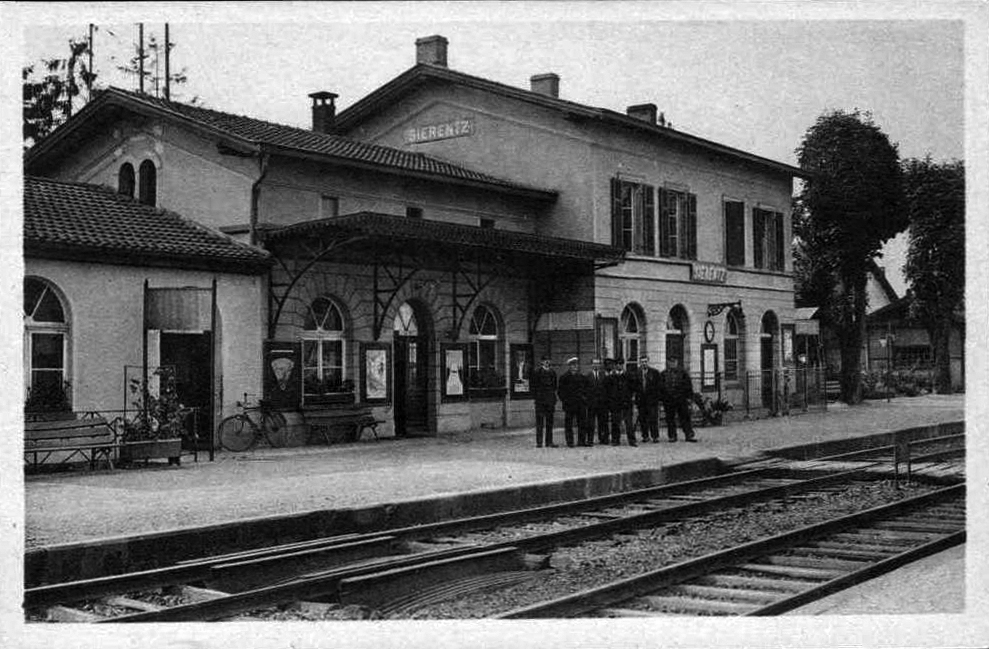
Gare de Sierentz in 1920.
