= Saint-Louis station =

Railway station in France

Saint-Louis
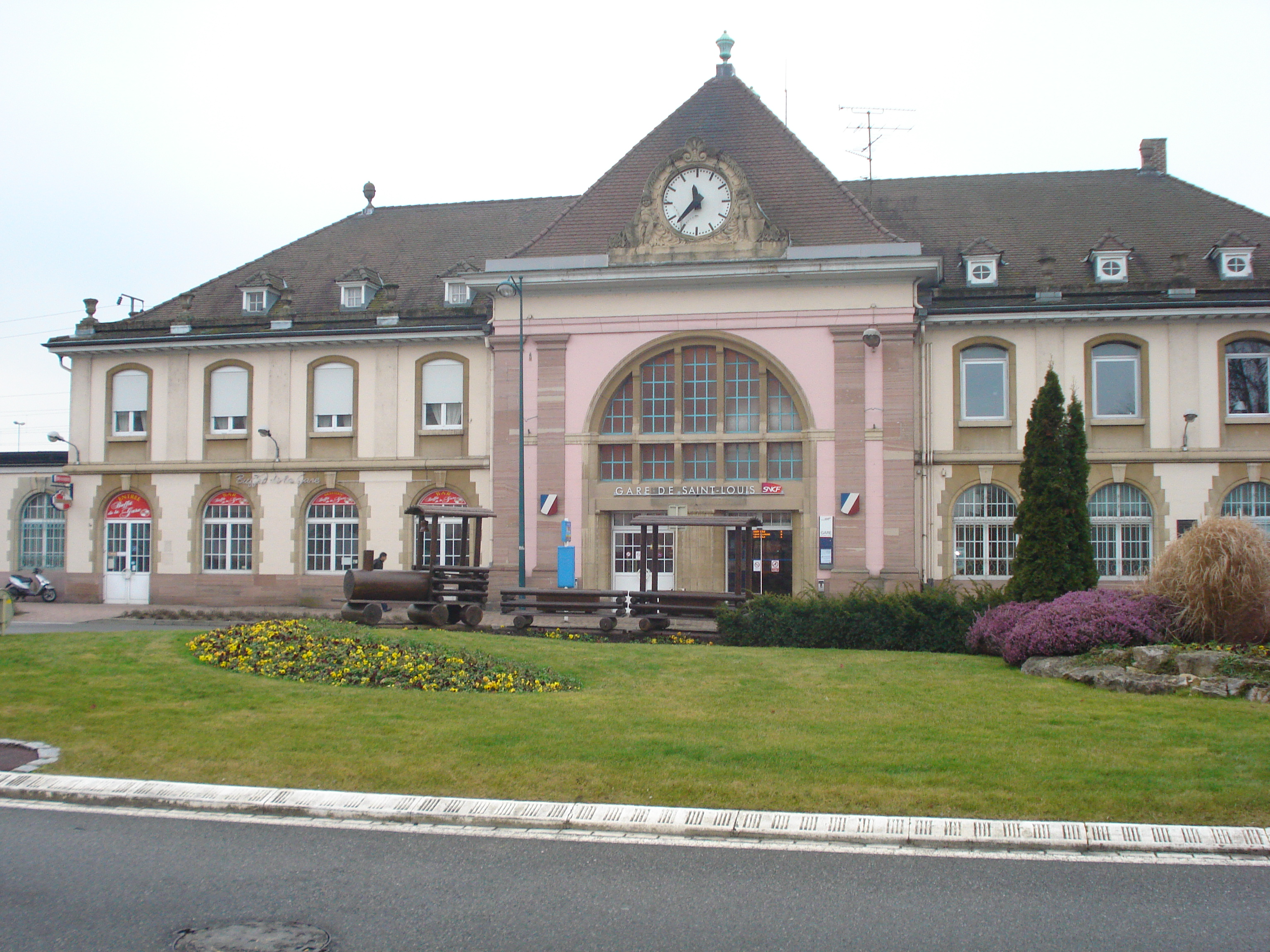

General information
- Location: 1a Place de la Gare; 68300 Saint-Louis; Haut-Rhin, France
- Coordinates: 47.590536°N 7.555856°E
- Owner: SNCF
- Operator: SNCF
- Lines: Strasbourg–Basel railway Saint-Louis–Huningue railway

Other information
- Station code: 87182139

Passengers
- 2024: 1,641,385

Services
Preceding station	TER Grand Est	Following station
Mulhouse towards Strasbourg	A01	Basel SNCF Terminus
Saint-Louis-la-Chaussée towards Mulhouse	A15	Basel St. Johann towards Basel SNCF
Preceding station	Basel S-Bahn	Following station
Saint-Louis-la-Chaussée towards Mulhouse Ville	TER	Basel St. Johann towards Basel SBB
Location

Saint-Louis station (French: Gare de Saint-Louis) is the main railway station in the border town of Saint-Louis, Haut-Rhin, France.

== Services ==
The station is served by regional trains to Mulhouse, Basel and Strasbourg.

- Basel S-Bahn TER / A15: hourly or better service between Mulhouse and Basel SBB.
- TER Grand Est A01: service between Strasbourg and Basel SBB.

== See also ==
- Rail transport in France
