= Bartenheim =

Commune in Grand Est, France

Bartenheim Bàrtene
- Commune
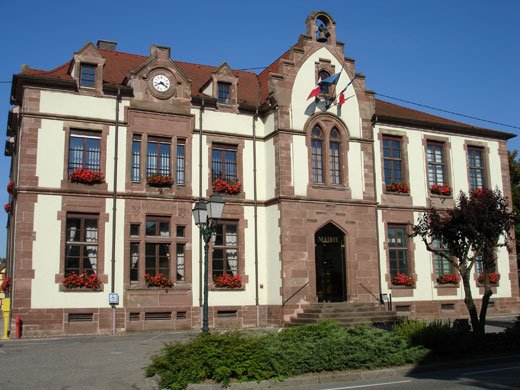
- Town hall of Bartenheim

- Coat of arms
- Location of Bartenheim
- Location within France Location within Grand Est
- Coordinates: 47°38′08″N 7°28′36″E
- Country: France
- Region: Grand Est
- Department: Haut-Rhin
- Arrondissement: Mulhouse
- Canton: Brunstatt-Didenheim
- Intercommunality: Saint-Louis Agglomération

Government
  - Mayor (2020–2026): Bernard Kannengieser
- Area^{1}: 12.86 km^{2} (4.97 sq mi)
- Elevation: 260 m (850 ft)
- Highest elevation: 311 m (1,020 ft)
- Lowest elevation: 237 m (778 ft)
- Population (2023): 4,211
  - Density: 327.4/km^{2} (848.1/sq mi)
- Time zone: UTC+01:00 (CET)
  - Summer (DST): UTC+02:00 (CEST)
- INSEE/Postal code: 68021 /68870
- ^{1} French Land Register data, which excludes lakes, ponds, glaciers > 1 km^{2} (0.386 sq mi or 247 acres) and river estuaries.

Bartenheim (French pronunciation: [baʁtənaim]; Alsatian: Bàrtana) is a commune in the Haut-Rhin department in Alsace in north-eastern France.

It is situated northwest of the EuroAirport Basel-Mulhouse-Freiburg, on the eastern edge of Sundgau. Bartenheim station has rail connections to Mulhouse and Basel.

== Population ==
Historical population
Year	Pop.	±% p.a.
1968	2,014	—
1975	2,413	+2.62%
1982	2,452	+0.23%
1990	2,483	+0.16%
1999	2,913	+1.79%
2007	3,469	+2.21%
2012	3,806	+1.87%
2017	3,837	+0.16%
2023	4,211	+1.56%
Source: INSEE

== See also ==
- Communes of the Haut-Rhin department
