= Saint-Louis-la-Chaussée station =

French railway station

Saint-Louis-la-Chaussée
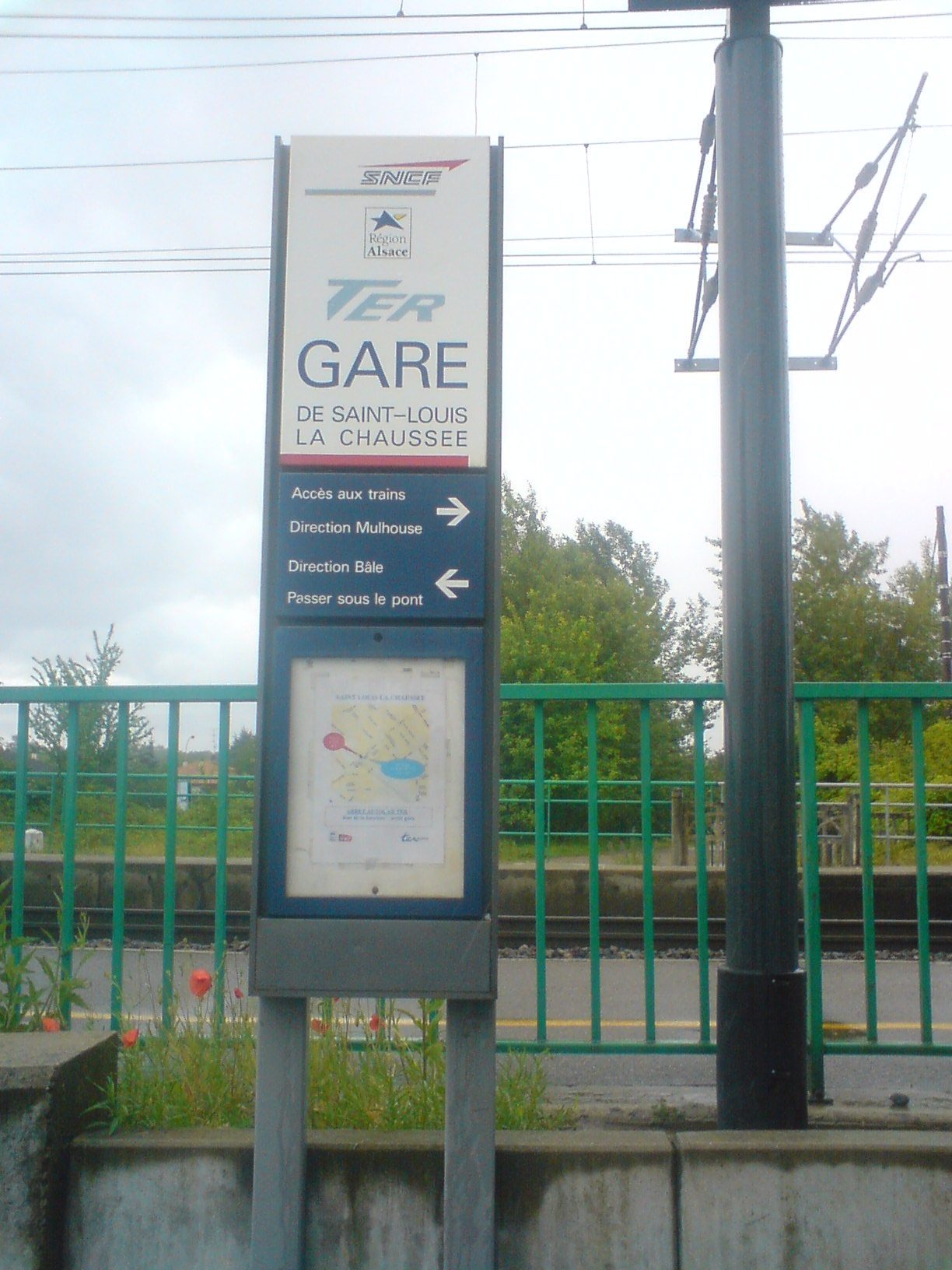

General information
- Location: Rue des Pinsons; 68300 Saint-Louis; Haut-Rhin, France
- Coordinates: 47.608992°N 7.530373°E
- Owner: SNCF
- Lines: Strasbourg–Basel railway Waldighoffen–Saint-Louis-la-Chaussée railway

Other information
- Station code: 87181016

Services
Preceding station	TER Grand Est	Following station
Bartenheim towards Mulhouse	A15	Saint-Louis towards Basel SNCF
Location

Saint-Louis-la-Chaussée station (French: Gare de Saint-Louis-la-Chaussée) is a railway station serving the community of Saint-Louis-la-Chaussée (Neuweg) in the north of the commune of Saint-Louis, Alsace, France. The station is served by regional trains to Mulhouse and Basel.
