= Sierentz =

Commune in Grand Est, France

- Commune
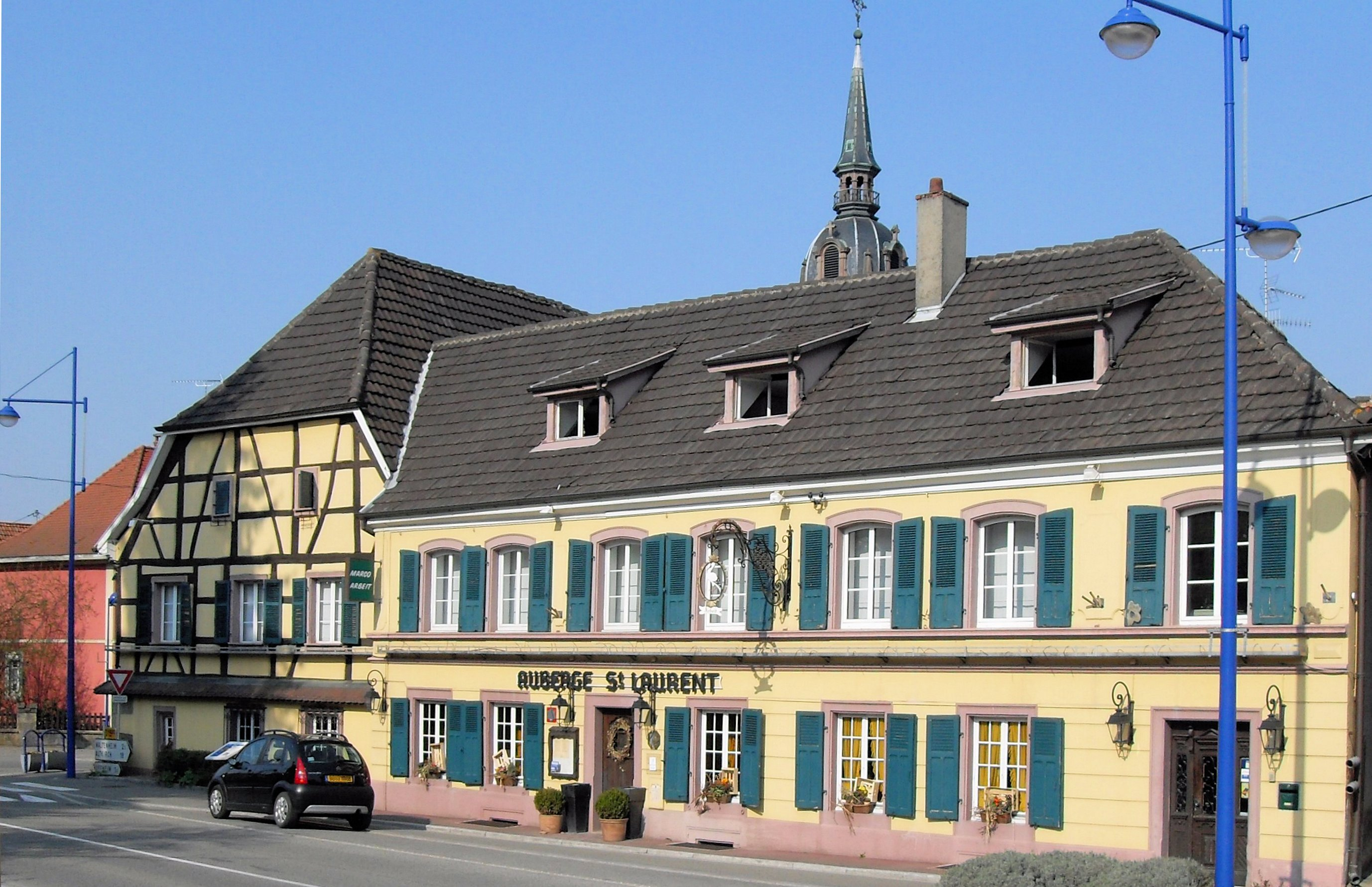
- The Saint-Laurent inn, in Sierentz

- Coat of arms
- Location of Sierentz
- Location within France Location within Grand Est
- Coordinates: 47°39′N 7°28′E
- Country: France
- Region: Grand Est
- Department: Haut-Rhin
- Arrondissement: Mulhouse
- Canton: Brunstatt-Didenheim
- Intercommunality: Saint-Louis Agglomération

Government
  - Mayor (2020–2026): Pascal Turri
- Area^{1}: 13.22 km^{2} (5.10 sq mi)
- Highest elevation: 301 m (988 ft)
- Lowest elevation: 244 m (801 ft)
- Population (2023): 4,409
  - Density: 333.5/km^{2} (863.8/sq mi)
- Time zone: UTC+01:00 (CET)
  - Summer (DST): UTC+02:00 (CEST)
- INSEE/Postal code: 68309 /68510
- ^{1} French Land Register data, which excludes lakes, ponds, glaciers > 1 km^{2} (0.386 sq mi or 247 acres) and river estuaries.

Sierentz (French pronunciation: [siʁɛnts]; Alsatian: Siarez; German: Sierenz) is a commune in the Haut-Rhin department in Alsace in north-eastern France. It is located roughly halfway between Mulhouse and Basel. Both cities can be accessed by train from Sierentz station.

== Population ==
Historical population
Year	Pop.	±% p.a.
1968	1,633	—
1975	1,711	+0.67%
1982	1,666	−0.38%
1990	2,106	+2.97%
1999	2,442	+1.66%
2007	2,625	+0.91%
2012	3,244	+4.33%
2017	3,696	+2.64%
2023	4,409	+2.98%
Source: INSEE

== See also ==
- Communes of the Haut-Rhin department
