= Lycée Jean Mermoz (Saint-Louis) =

Senior high school in France

Lycée Jean-Mermoz is a senior high school/sixth-form college in Saint-Louis, Haut-Rhin, France, in the Basel-Mulhouse-Freiburg area.

The school opened on 29 June 1958 and finished its most recent renovations on 3 May 2008.

It is the largest secondary school in the Académie de Strasbourg.

== Courses ==
The school offers several different orientation options to its students who have the choice between general, bac pro and technologique.

=== General ===
Students who choose general have the choice between many specialisms offered by the school.

- Mathematics
- Physics and Chemistry
- HGGSP
- SES
- SVT
- HLP
- NSI
- SI
- LLCER

=== Technologique ===
- STI2D
- STMG

=== Professionnel ===
- CAP AAGA
- CAP PSR
- CAP EPC
- BAC PRO AEPA
- CAP ELEC
- BAC PRO MELEC
- BAC PRO TRPM
- BAC PRO MSPC
- CAP MES
- BAC PRO MCV
- BAC PRO AMA MES
- BAC PRO AGORA
- BAC PRO MRC

== News ==
L'Est Républicain described it as "un lycée comme une ville" (a lycee that is like a city).

In 2024 the newspaper L'Alsace-Le Pays stated that the school had maintained stability. In 2023, there was also a similar number of students enrolled from the previous year, after previous student enrollment increases.
