= Folgensbourg =

Commune in Grand Est, France

- Commune
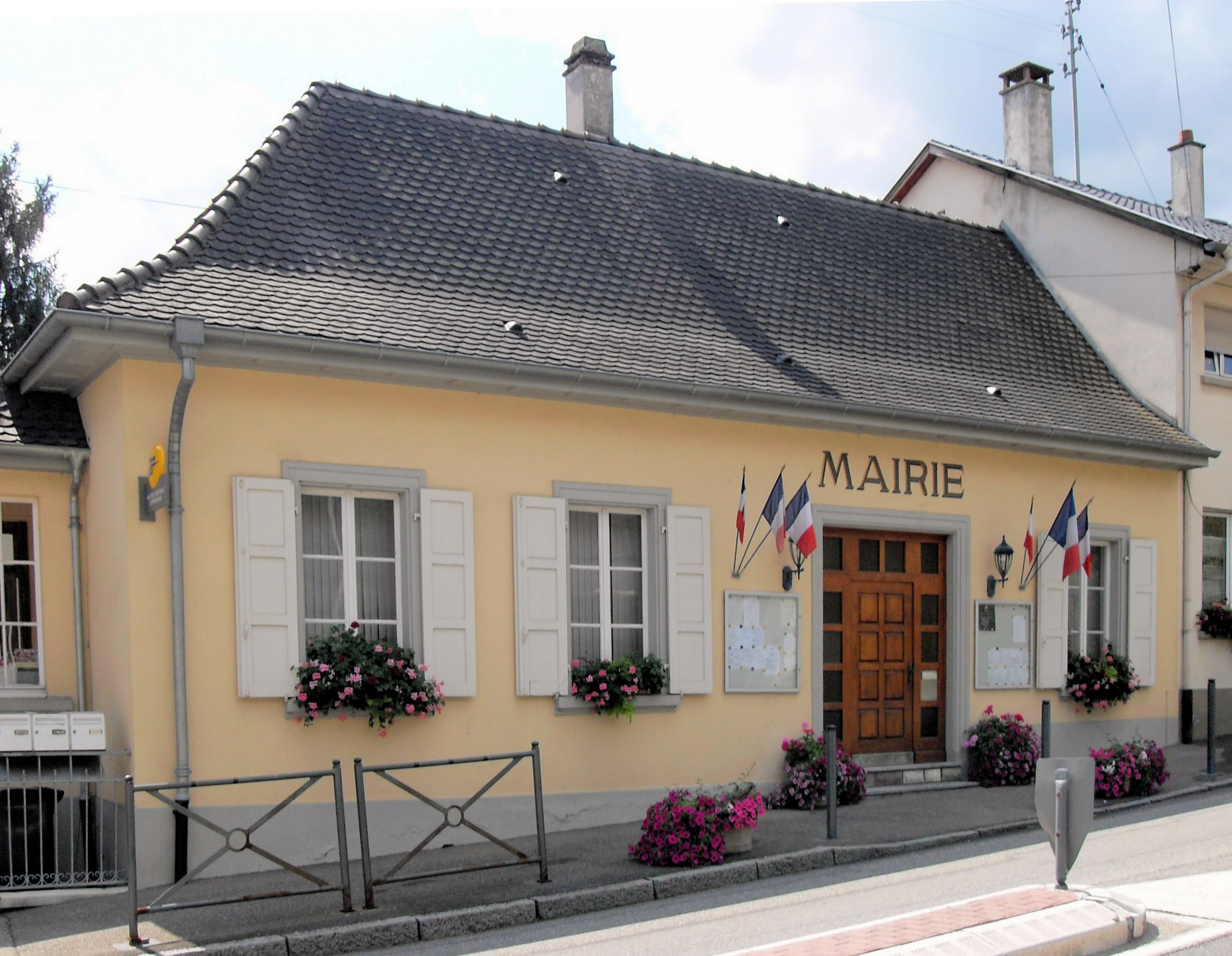
- The town hall in Folgensbourg

- Coat of arms
- Location of Folgensbourg
- Location within France Location within Grand Est
- Coordinates: 47°33′04″N 7°26′45″E
- Country: France
- Region: Grand Est
- Department: Haut-Rhin
- Arrondissement: Mulhouse
- Canton: Saint-Louis
- Intercommunality: Saint-Louis Agglomération

Government
  - Mayor (2020–2026): Max Delmond
- Area^{1}: 6.72 km^{2} (2.59 sq mi)
- Elevation: 450 m (1,480 ft)
- Highest elevation: 499 m (1,637 ft)
- Lowest elevation: 365 m (1,198 ft)
- Population (2023): 906
  - Density: 135/km^{2} (349/sq mi)
- Time zone: UTC+01:00 (CET)
  - Summer (DST): UTC+02:00 (CEST)
- INSEE/Postal code: 68094 /68220
- ^{1} French Land Register data, which excludes lakes, ponds, glaciers > 1 km^{2} (0.386 sq mi or 247 acres) and river estuaries.

Folgensbourg (French pronunciation: [fɔlɡənsbuʁ]; German: Volkensberg; Alsatian: Folgeschburg) is a commune in the Haut-Rhin department, in Alsace in north-eastern France.

== Population ==
Historical population
Year	Pop.	±% p.a.
1968	532	—
1975	600	+1.73%
1982	590	−0.24%
1990	581	−0.19%
1999	633	+0.96%
2007	749	+2.13%
2012	899	+3.72%
2017	918	+0.42%
2023	906	−0.22%
Source: INSEE

== See also ==
- Communes of the Haut-Rhin département
