= Blotzheim =

Commune in Grand Est, France

Blotzheim Blohze
- Commune
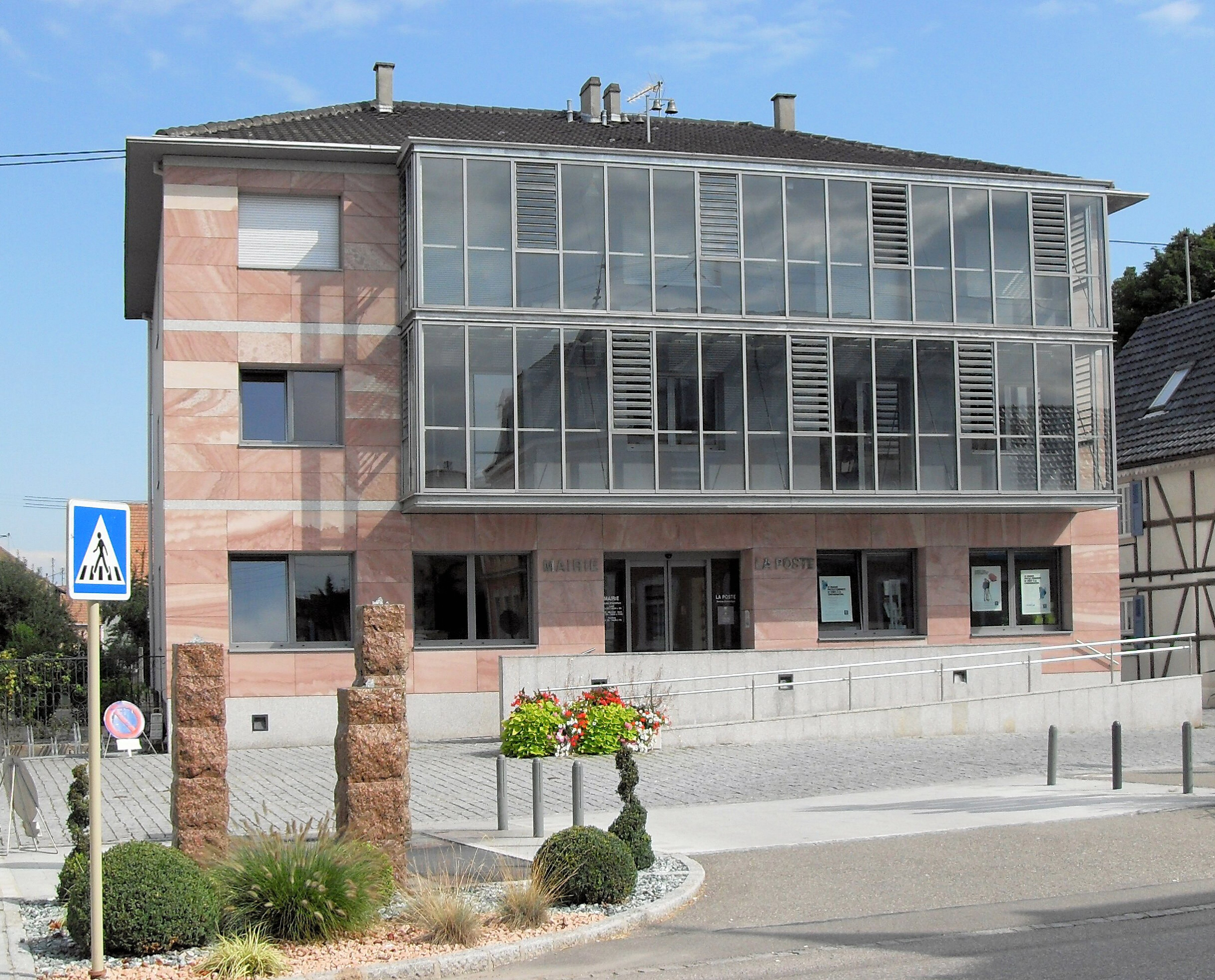
- The town hall in Blotzheim

- Coat of arms
- Location of Blotzheim
- Location within France Location within Grand Est
- Coordinates: 47°36′07″N 7°29′49″E
- Country: France
- Region: Grand Est
- Department: Haut-Rhin
- Arrondissement: Mulhouse
- Canton: Saint-Louis
- Intercommunality: Saint-Louis Agglomération

Government
  - Mayor (2026–32): Sandrine Schmitt-Meyer
- Area^{1}: 14.6 km^{2} (5.6 sq mi)
- Highest elevation: 323 m (1,060 ft)
- Lowest elevation: 242 m (794 ft)
- Population (2023): 5,282
  - Density: 362/km^{2} (937/sq mi)
- Time zone: UTC+01:00 (CET)
  - Summer (DST): UTC+02:00 (CEST)
- INSEE/Postal code: 68042 /68730
- ^{1} French Land Register data, which excludes lakes, ponds, glaciers > 1 km^{2} (0.386 sq mi or 247 acres) and river estuaries.

Blotzheim (French pronunciation: [blɔtsaim]; Alsatian: Blohze) is a commune in the Haut-Rhin department, Alsace, northeastern France.

== Population ==
Historical population
Year	Pop.	±% p.a.
1968	2,110	—
1975	2,353	+1.57%
1982	2,340	−0.08%
1990	3,090	+3.54%
1999	3,564	+1.60%
2007	3,785	+0.75%
2012	4,268	+2.43%
2017	4,526	+1.18%
2023	5,282	+2.61%
Source: INSEE

== See also ==
- Communes of the Haut-Rhin department
