= Saint-Louis, Haut-Rhin =

Commune in Grand Est, France

Saint-Louis Sä-Louis (Alemannic German) Sankt Ludwig (German)
- Commune
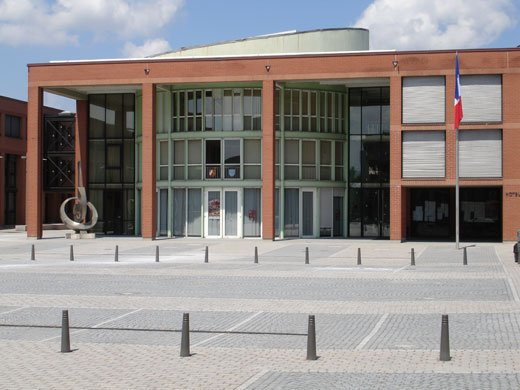
- The Hôtel de Ville

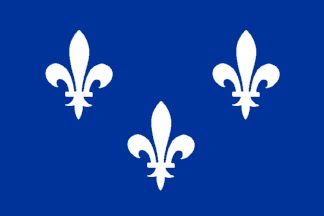
- Flag Coat of arms
- Location of Saint-Louis
- Location within France Location within Grand Est
- Coordinates: 47°35′N 7°34′E
- Country: France
- Region: Grand Est
- Department: Haut-Rhin
- Arrondissement: Mulhouse
- Canton: Saint-Louis
- Intercommunality: Saint-Louis Agglomération

Government
  - Mayor (2020–2026): Pascale Schmidiger (LR)
- Area^{1}: 16.85 km^{2} (6.51 sq mi)
- Highest elevation: 278 m (912 ft)
- Lowest elevation: 237 m (778 ft)
- Population (2023): 22,805
  - Density: 1,353/km^{2} (3,505/sq mi)
- Time zone: UTC+01:00 (CET)
  - Summer (DST): UTC+02:00 (CEST)
- INSEE/Postal code: 68297 /68300
- Dialling codes: 0389, +41 61 (for companies in the EuroAirport using Swisscom)
- ^{1} French Land Register data, which excludes lakes, ponds, glaciers > 1 km^{2} (0.386 sq mi or 247 acres) and river estuaries.

Saint-Louis (French pronunciation: [sɛ̃ lwi]; Alsatian: Sä-Louis; German: Sankt Ludwig) is a commune in the Haut-Rhin department in Alsace in north-eastern France.

The inhabitants are called Ludoviciens.

== History ==
Following the conquest of the Sundgau and other parts of the Alsace by France in the course of the Thirty Years' War and the Peace of Westphalia, the French crown took a growing interest in the control and security of the land west of the Rhine at the Rhine knee below the territory of the Canton of Basel (which joined the Old Swiss Confederacy in 1501). In 1679, therefore, as part of a deliberation proclamation of his continued expansion policy on the Upper Rhine (which included the capture of Colmar in 1673, the defeat of imperial and Palatine troops at Türckheim, the plundering of the town in 1675, and the Treaties of Nijmegen in 1679), Louis XIV ordered the construction of Hüningen Fortress at this strategic point. The occupants of the place, the fishing village of Hüningen, had to leave to make way for this military fortification, the construction of which was carried out by fortress architect, Vauban in 1680. The villagers were rehoused in the newly founded Village-Neuf on the road from Basel to Paris via Mulhouse, where the first element of the present day village of Saint-Louis was established on the state border. This settlement, consisting of several border guards and taverns was initially part of the municipality of Hüningen's "new village". On 26 November 1684 — around 3 years after the high point of France's policy of annexation or politique des Réunions — the capture of Strasbourg - the town was officially named by Louis XIV. Its patron is not actually the Sun King himself, but his predecessor, the canonized King Louis IX or Saint Louis.

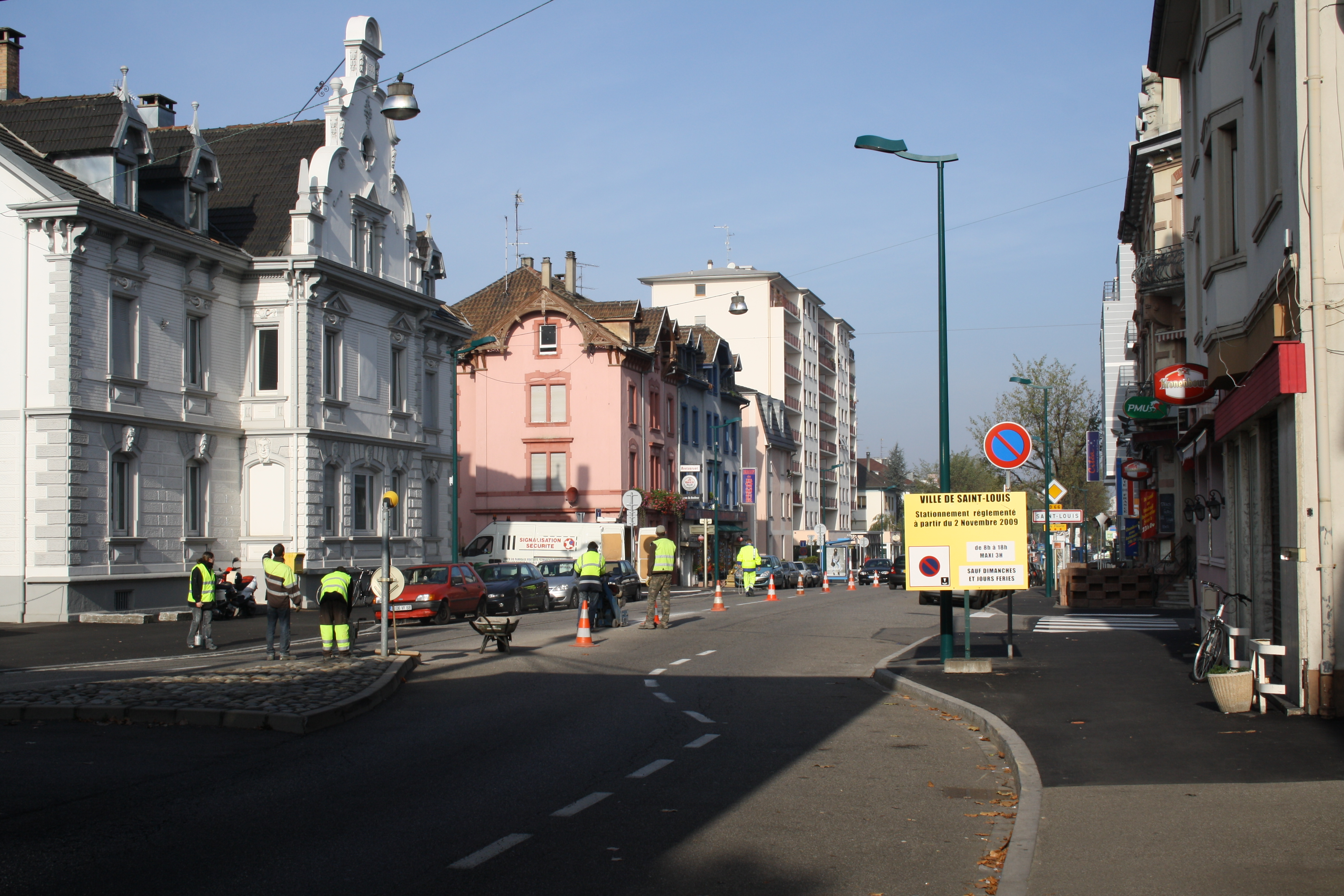
Avenue de Bâle

In the course of the French Revolution the town was renamed from 1793 to 1814 as Bourglibre (German: Burgliber).

In 1953 the municipality of Bourgfelden was incorporated and was followed in 1958 by the village of Neuweg (La Chaussée) from Blotzheim. Since then most of the land of Basel-Mulhouse Airport has been on the soil of the town of Saint-Louis. The Hôtel de Ville of Saint-Louis was completed in 1989.

On 30 October 2000 the community association of Communauté de communes des Trois Frontières was formed in Saint-Louis where it also has its head office. The association was turned into an agglomeration community in 2016.

== Geography ==
Saint-Louis is located at the German and Swiss borders, just north of Basel. The EuroAirport Basel Mulhouse Freiburg is situated on its territory. The town is served by two railway stations on the line Mulhouse–Basel: Saint-Louis station and Saint-Louis-la-Chaussée station.

The commune of Saint-Louis also contains the former villages of Bourgfelden and Neuweg (also known as Saint-Louis-la-Chaussée, or Näiwaag in Sundgau Alsatian).

== Population ==
Historical population

Year	Pop.	±% p.a.
1793	590	—
1800	830	+5.00%
1806	662	−3.70%
1821	966	+2.55%
1831	1,263	+2.72%
1836	1,327	+0.99%
1841	1,459	+1.91%
1846	1,473	+0.19%
1851	1,464	−0.12%
1856	1,520	+0.75%
1861	1,635	+1.47%
1866	1,731	+1.15%
1871	1,731	+0.00%
1875	1,970	+3.29%
1880	2,066	+0.96%
1885	2,292	+2.10%
1890	2,642	+2.88%
1895	3,022	+2.72%
1900	4,018	+5.86%

Year	Pop.	±% p.a.
1905	4,737	+3.35%
1910	5,417	+2.72%
1921	5,376	−0.07%
1926	5,700	+1.18%
1931	6,375	+2.26%
1936	7,158	+2.34%
1946	6,475	−1.00%
1954	9,122	+4.38%
1962	12,378	+3.89%
1968	14,845	+3.08%
1975	18,007	+2.80%
1982	18,682	+0.53%
1990	19,547	+0.57%
1999	19,961	+0.23%
2007	19,995	+0.02%
2012	19,990	−0.01%
2017	21,177	+1.16%
2023	22,805	+1.24%

Source: EHESS and INSEE (1968-2023)

== Economy ==
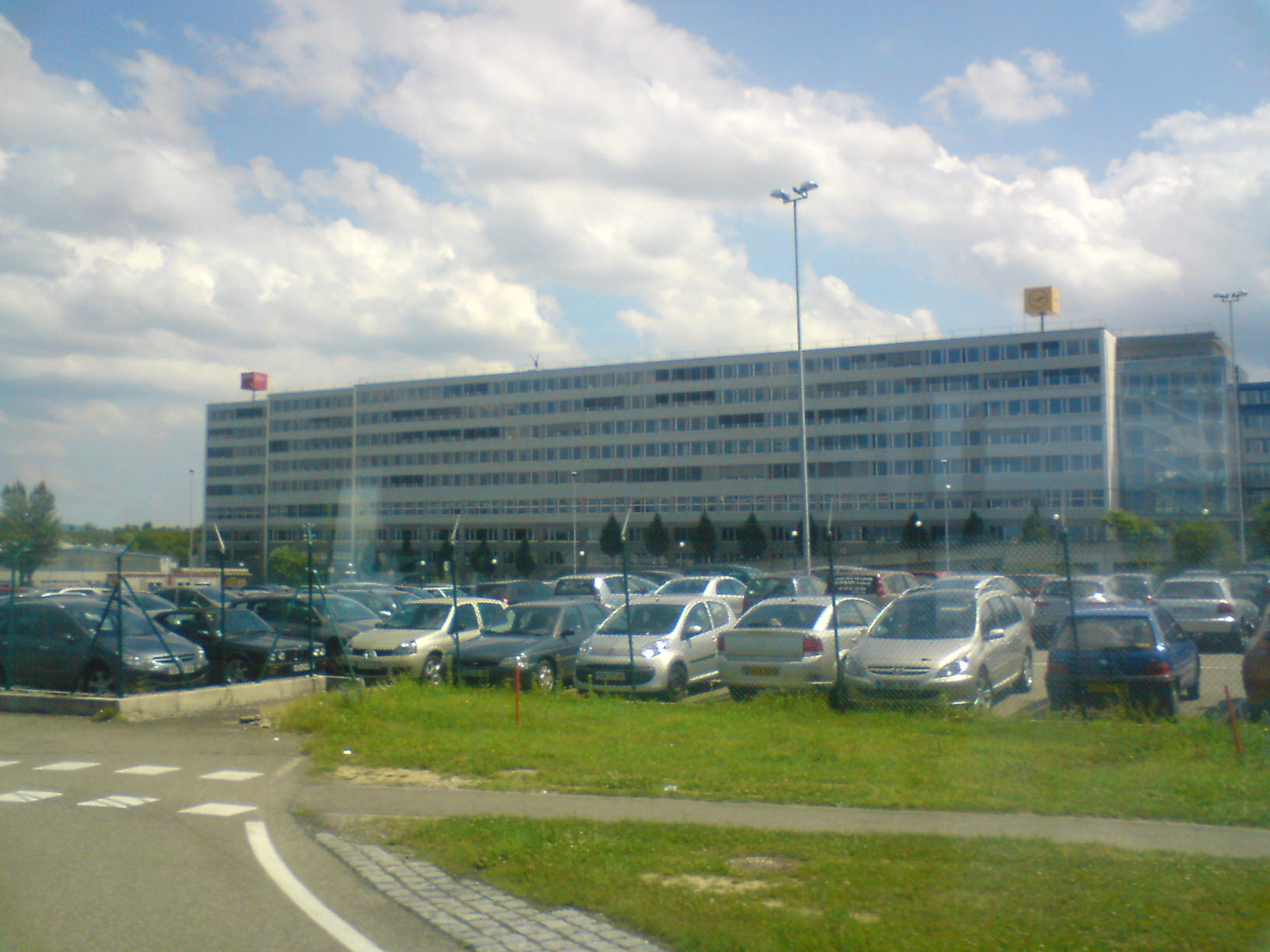
Swiss International Air Lines head office at EuroAirport

Swiss International Air Lines was headquartered on the grounds of EuroAirport Basel-Mulhouse-Freiburg in Saint-Louis; while the airport is physically in France, the Swiss head office lies in the Swiss zone of the airport, and it may only be accessed from Switzerland. Hello, a Swiss airline, had its head office in the General Aviation area of EuroAirport.

Prior to the formation of Swiss International Air Lines, the regional airline Crossair was headquartered on the grounds of EuroAirport. Prior to its dissolution, Crossair Europe was headquartered on the grounds of EuroAirport. The airline Farnair Switzerland formerly had its head office at EuroAirport. As in the case of the Swiss head office, the area with the former Farnair head office may only be accessed from Switzerland. The head office moved to its current location, the Villa Guggenheim in Allschwil, in proximity to EuroAirport, on 1 October 2011.

== Education ==
Maternelles (preschools) include Louis Armand, Baerenfels, Octavie Krafft, Nussbaum, Petite Camargue, Jules Verne, and Wallart. There are two Écoles élémentaires, École de Bourgfelden and École Galilée. Combined maternelle and primaire groupes scolaires are La Cigogne / Victor Hugo and Widemann / Sarasin.

Collège Georges Forlen and Collège Schickele are the junior high schools.

Lycée Jean-Mermoz serves sixth form/senior high school students.

== Climate ==
Saint-Louis features a temperate oceanic climate (Köppen: Cfb) but its location further away from the ocean gives the city colder winters with some snow, and often hot and humid summers, in comparison with the rest of France.

Climate data for Saint-Louis (EuroAirport) (1991–2020 normals, extremes 1947–present)
Month	Jan	Feb	Mar	Apr	May	Jun	Jul	Aug	Sep	Oct	Nov	Dec	Year
Record high °C (°F)	18.8 (65.8)	21.8 (71.2)	26.2 (79.2)	30.0 (86.0)	33.8 (92.8)	40.3 (104.5)	40.2 (104.4)	39.1 (102.4)	33.7 (92.7)	31.0 (87.8)	23.4 (74.1)	19.9 (67.8)	40.3 (104.5)
Mean daily maximum °C (°F)	5.5 (41.9)	7.4 (45.3)	12.1 (53.8)	16.5 (61.7)	20.4 (68.7)	24.2 (75.6)	26.4 (79.5)	26.1 (79.0)	21.4 (70.5)	16.0 (60.8)	9.7 (49.5)	6.1 (43.0)	16.0 (60.8)
Daily mean °C (°F)	2.3 (36.1)	3.4 (38.1)	7.0 (44.6)	10.7 (51.3)	14.8 (58.6)	18.5 (65.3)	20.3 (68.5)	20.0 (68.0)	15.8 (60.4)	11.4 (52.5)	6.2 (43.2)	3.1 (37.6)	11.1 (52.0)
Mean daily minimum °C (°F)	−0.8 (30.6)	−0.6 (30.9)	1.9 (35.4)	4.9 (40.8)	9.3 (48.7)	12.7 (54.9)	14.2 (57.6)	14.0 (57.2)	10.2 (50.4)	6.9 (44.4)	2.8 (37.0)	0.1 (32.2)	6.3 (43.3)
Record low °C (°F)	−23.5 (−10.3)	−22.8 (−9.0)	−16.4 (2.5)	−6.3 (20.7)	−3.1 (26.4)	1.8 (35.2)	5.1 (41.2)	3.4 (38.1)	−0.9 (30.4)	−6.3 (20.7)	−12.6 (9.3)	−18.7 (−1.7)	−23.5 (−10.3)
Average precipitation mm (inches)	46.1 (1.81)	43.9 (1.73)	47.4 (1.87)	57.6 (2.27)	86.6 (3.41)	74.5 (2.93)	72.0 (2.83)	80.0 (3.15)	63.5 (2.50)	68.5 (2.70)	60.8 (2.39)	63.4 (2.50)	764.3 (30.09)
Average precipitation days (≥ 1.0 mm)	9.1	8.6	9.1	9.4	11.2	10.0	10.1	10.1	9.0	10.5	10.0	10.7	117.8
Mean monthly sunshine hours	68.4	91.2	145.6	181.1	201.9	228.2	247.5	233.8	168.4	120.9	70.2	62.1	1,819.1
Source: Meteociel

== See also ==
- Communes of the Haut-Rhin department
