= Chiquet =

Chiquet is a given name and surname. Notable people with the name include:

surname

- Agnès Chiquet (born 1984), French weightlifter
- Maureen Chiquet (born 1963), American businesswoman
- Ruth Chiquet-Ehrismann (1954–2015), Swiss biochemist and cell biologist

given name

- Chiquet Mawet (1937–2000), Belgian playwright
