= Bernhard Christ =

Swiss lawyer, notary, politician and translator

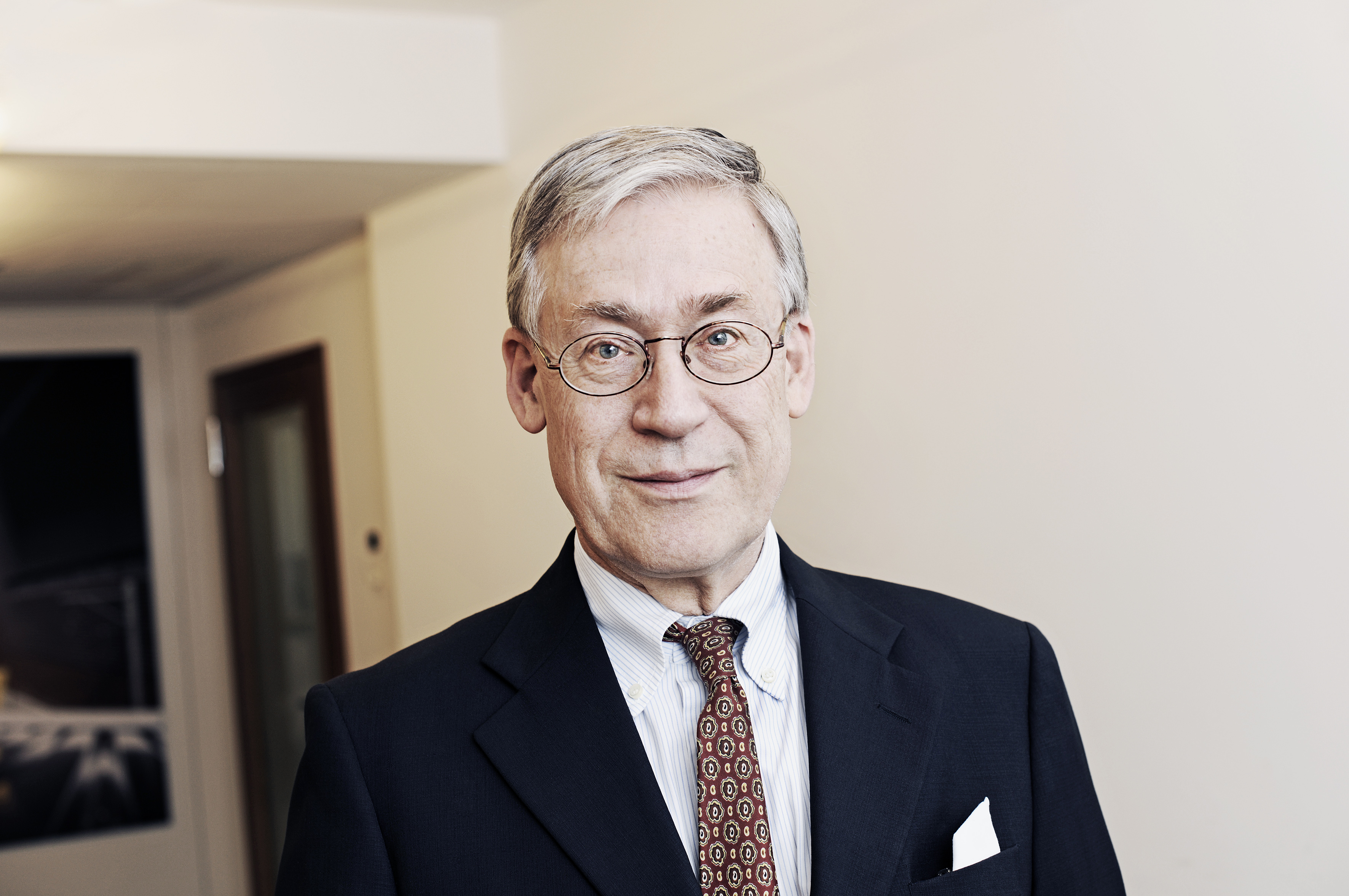
- Bernhard Christ (2012)
- Born: 9 December 1942 (age 83); Basel, Switzerland
- Education: University of Basel
- Known for: translating the Divine Comedy into German
- Spouse: Marie-Isabelle de Pury (married 1975 - present)
- Children: 3

Bernhard Christ (born 9 December 1942 in Basel) is a Swiss lawyer, notary, politician and translator. Among other roles, he served as President of the Grand Council of the Canton of Basel-Stadt and was president of the Karl Barth foundation for 40 years. He is known for having translated and commented the Divine Comedy of Dante Alighieri.

== Life ==
=== Lawyer ===
Bernhard Christ attended the gymnasium at Münsterplatz and studied at the University of Basel, where he also earned his doctorate. Among other achievements, he was the lawyer for Firestone Switzerland Ltd in the sensational trial following the closure of the tire factory in Pratteln. The trial was about payments for the 600 workers who had been laid off. He later worked as a senior partner at the law firm Vischer in Basel.

=== Politician ===
As a politician, Bernhard Christ was a member of the Grand Council of the Canton of Basel-Stadt from 6 November 1979 to 30 April 1988 and from 11 May 1992 to 31 January 2003, and on 10 May 1984 elected President of the Grand Council. He was also a member of the canton's constitutional council from 1999 to 2005, president of the Constitutional Council, a member of the cantonal education council and of the board of the Reformed Church and of several charitable foundations.

=== Translator ===
Bernhard Christ's translation of Dante's Divine Comedy was published in 2021 to mark the 700th anniversary of the death of the poet by Schwabe, Christ translated the text into prose. In the review by Ulrich Klappstein of Bernhard Christ's translation, the controversy of translating into verse or prose is discussed.

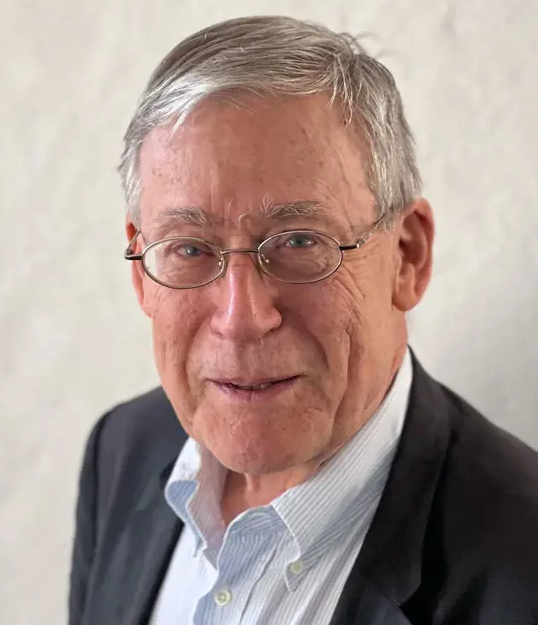
Bernhard Christ (2023)

=== Family ===
Bernhard Christ has been married to Marie-Isabelle de Pury since 1975, and has three adult children and six grandchildren.

== Publications ==
- Die Basler Stadtgerichtsordnung von 1719 als Abschluss der Rezeption in Basel, Basel and Stuttgart 1971 (Dissertation)
- Das Kontrollrecht des Kommanditärs, Juristischen Fakultät der Universität Basel, Basel and Stuttgart, 1973, Festgabe zum Schweizerischen Juristentag 1975
- Der Darlehensvertrag, in: Schweizerisches Privatrecht, Obligationenrecht, Besondere Vertragsverhältnisse, Basel and Stuttgart 1979, Band VII, 2, Frank Vischer (Hrsg.)
- Staatsrechtsgeschichtliche Anmerkungen zu einem Eidgenössischen Staatskalender aus dem Jahre 1718, Basel 1981, Festgabe Adolf Sebass
- Reden des Präsidenten des Grossen Rates 1984/85, Basel, 1986, LDP Schriftenreihe 4
- Der Grosse Rat von Basel-Stadt, in: Paul Stadlin (Hrsg.) Die Parlamente der schweizerischen Kantone, Zug 1990
- (zusammen mit Markus Kutter), Liberale Politik - eine Standortbestimmung, 1. Ausgabe 1992, 2. Ausgabe 2014 (publication of the Liberal-Demokratic Party of the canton Basel-Stadt)
- Die Loslösung der alten Eidgenossenschaft vom Heiligen Römischen Reich Deutscher Nation, Basel, 2000. In: Wettstein, die Schweiz und Europa, Historisches Museum Basel (Hrsg.), Basel 1998
- Symposium für Frank Vischer, herausgegeben von Bernhard Christ und Ernst A. Kramer. Helbing & Lichtenhahn, Basel 2005
- Basler Denkmalschutzrecht im Vollzug, in: 25 Jahre Basler Denkmalschutzgesetz – Ein kritischer Rückblick (Freiwillige Denkmalpflege, 2004 -2208) Basel 2008
- Der Willensvollstrecker Art. 517 und 518 ZGB, in: Praxiskommentar Erbrecht, Daniel Abt/Thomas Weibel, Helbing Lichtenhahn Verlag, Basel 2009; 5. Aufl. 2023
- (translator and commentator) Dante Alighieri, Commedia, übertragen und erläutert von Bernhard Christ, Schwabe Verlag, Basel/Berlin 2021, ISBN 978-3-7965-4420-0

== Awards ==
- 2008: Honorary doctorate from the faculty of theology at the University of Basel
- 2018: Karl Barth Prize of the Union of Protestant Churches in the EKD in Germany

== Memberships ==
- Karl Barth Foundation, Director from 1984 to 2024
- E. E. Zunft zum Schlüssel (Basel), Guild master from 1986 to 1998
- Liberal-Demokratic Party (Basel-Stadt): Parliamentary party spokesman in the Great Council
- Basel Historical Museum: Member from 1973/4, President under two directors in succession
- State Commission for the Historical Museum Basel (Supervisory Board of the HMB): Member
- Sophie and Karl Binding Foundation: Member of the Board of Trustees since 1986 and its chairman from 1997 to 2013
- Hansa AG: President of the Board of Directors
