= Frenkendorf-Füllinsdorf railway station =

Railway station in Frenkendorf, Basel-Landschaft, Switzerland

Frenkendorf-Füllinsdorf
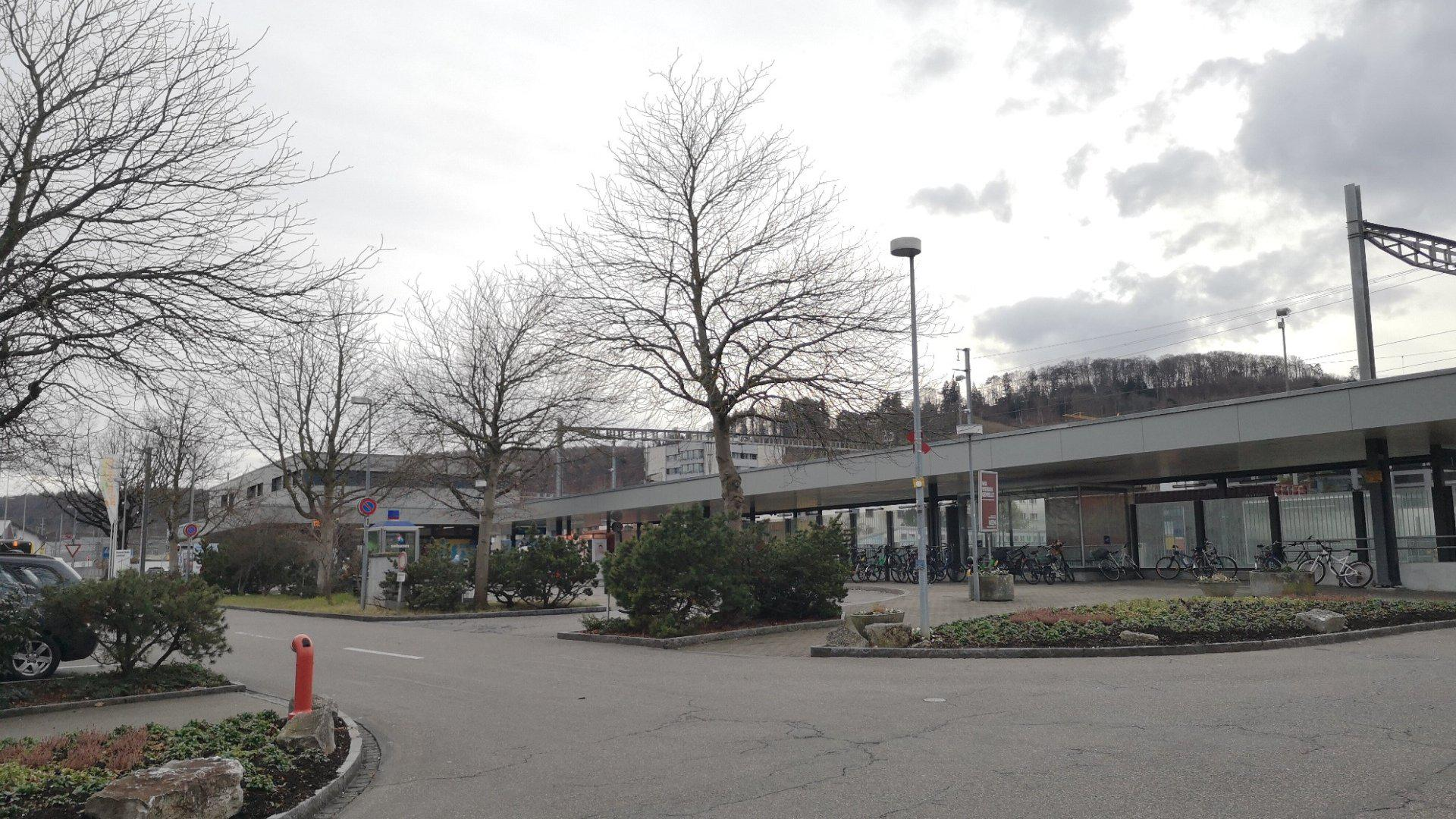
- The station in 2019

General information
- Location: Frenkendorf; Switzerland
- Coordinates: 47°30′05″N 7°43′09″E
- Elevation: 310 m (1,020 ft)
- Owner: Swiss Federal Railways
- Line: Hauenstein line
- Distance: 12.2 km (7.6 mi) from Basel SBB
- Train operators: Swiss Federal Railways
- Connections: Autobus AG Liestal bus lines

Other information
- Fare zone: 20 (tnw)

History
- Former names: "Niederschöntal", "Frenkendorf", "Niederschöntal-Frenkendorf" (before 1936)

Passengers
- 2018: 4,300 per weekday

Services
Preceding station	Basel S-Bahn	Following station
Pratteln towards Delémont	S3	Liestal towards Olten
Pratteln towards Basel SBB	S33	Liestal towards Sissach
Location

Frenkendorf-Füllinsdorf railway station (German: Bahnhof Frenkendorf-Füllinsdorf) is a railway station in the municipality of Frenkendorf, in the Swiss canton of Basel-Landschaft. It is an intermediate stop on the standard gauge Hauenstein line of Swiss Federal Railways. The station is located in Frenkendorf, across the Ergolz river from Füllinsdorf.

== Services ==
As of the December 2025 timetable change, the following services stop at Frenkendorf-Füllinsdorf:

- Basel trinational S-Bahn /: service every fifteen minutes to Liestal; every half-hour to Laufen and Olten with additional peak hour service to Sissach; and two trains per day to Delémont.
