= Pratteln Salina Raurica railway station =

Railway station in Switzerland

Pratteln Salina Raurica
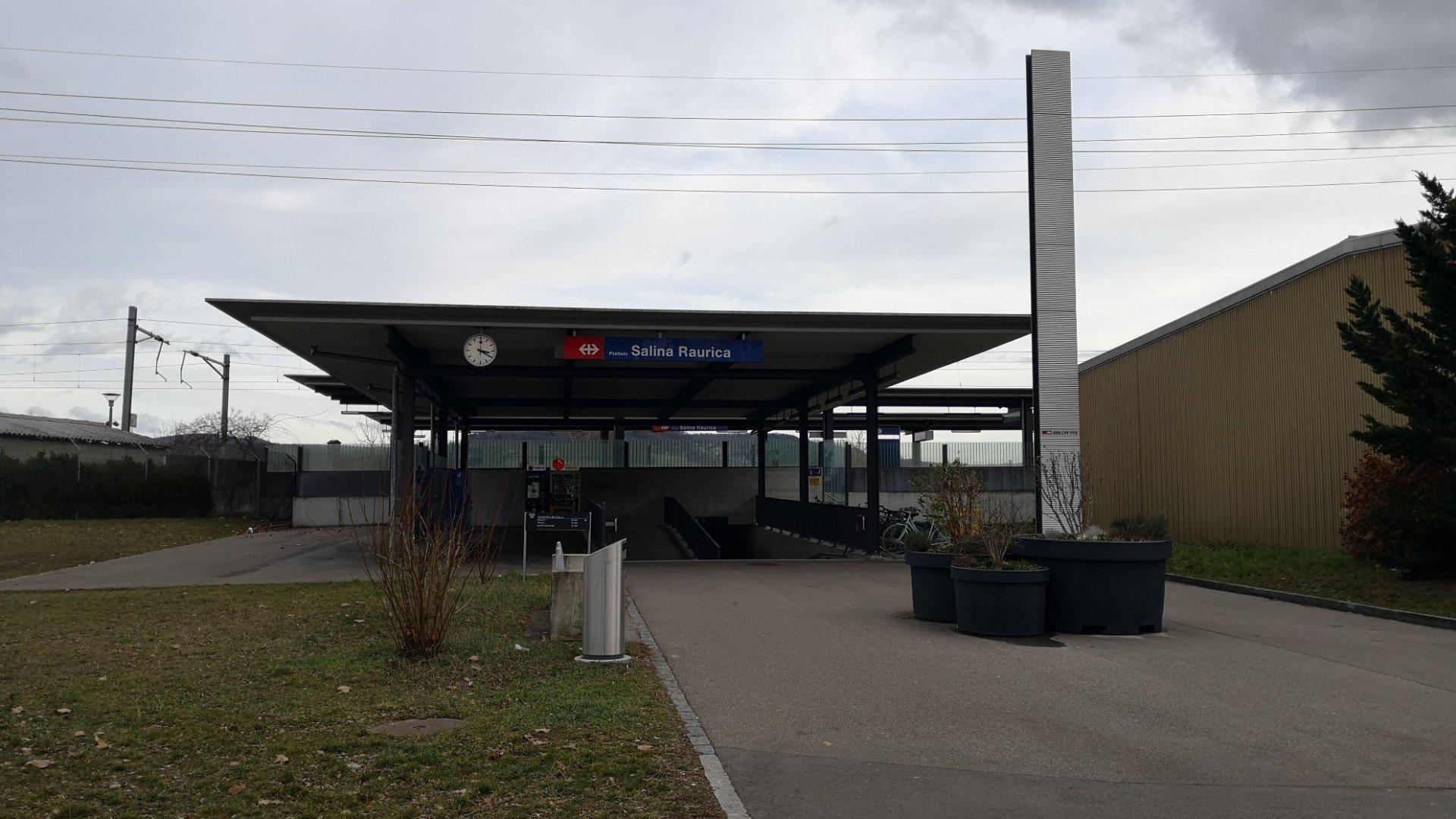
- The station in 2018

General information
- Location: Pratteln; Switzerland
- Coordinates: 47°31′50.45″N 7°42′38.86″E
- Owner: Swiss Federal Railways
- Line: Bözberg line
- Train operators: Swiss Federal Railways

History
- Opened: 14 December 2008

Services
| Preceding station | Basel S-Bahn | Following station |
|---|---|---|
| Pratteln towards Basel SBB | S1 | Kaiseraugst towards Laufenburg or Frick |
Location
- Location within Switzerland Location within Canton of Basel-Landschaft

Pratteln Salina Raurica railway station (German: Bahnhof Pratteln Salina Raurica) is a railway station in the municipality of Pratteln, in the Swiss canton of Basel-Landschaft. It is an intermediate stop on the Bözberg line and is served by local trains only.

== Services ==
As of the December 2025 timetable change, the following services stop at Pratteln Salina Raurica:

- : half-hourly service between Basel SBB and Stein-Säckingen and hourly service to Frick or Laufenburg.
