= Pratteln railway station =

Railway station in Switzerland

Pratteln
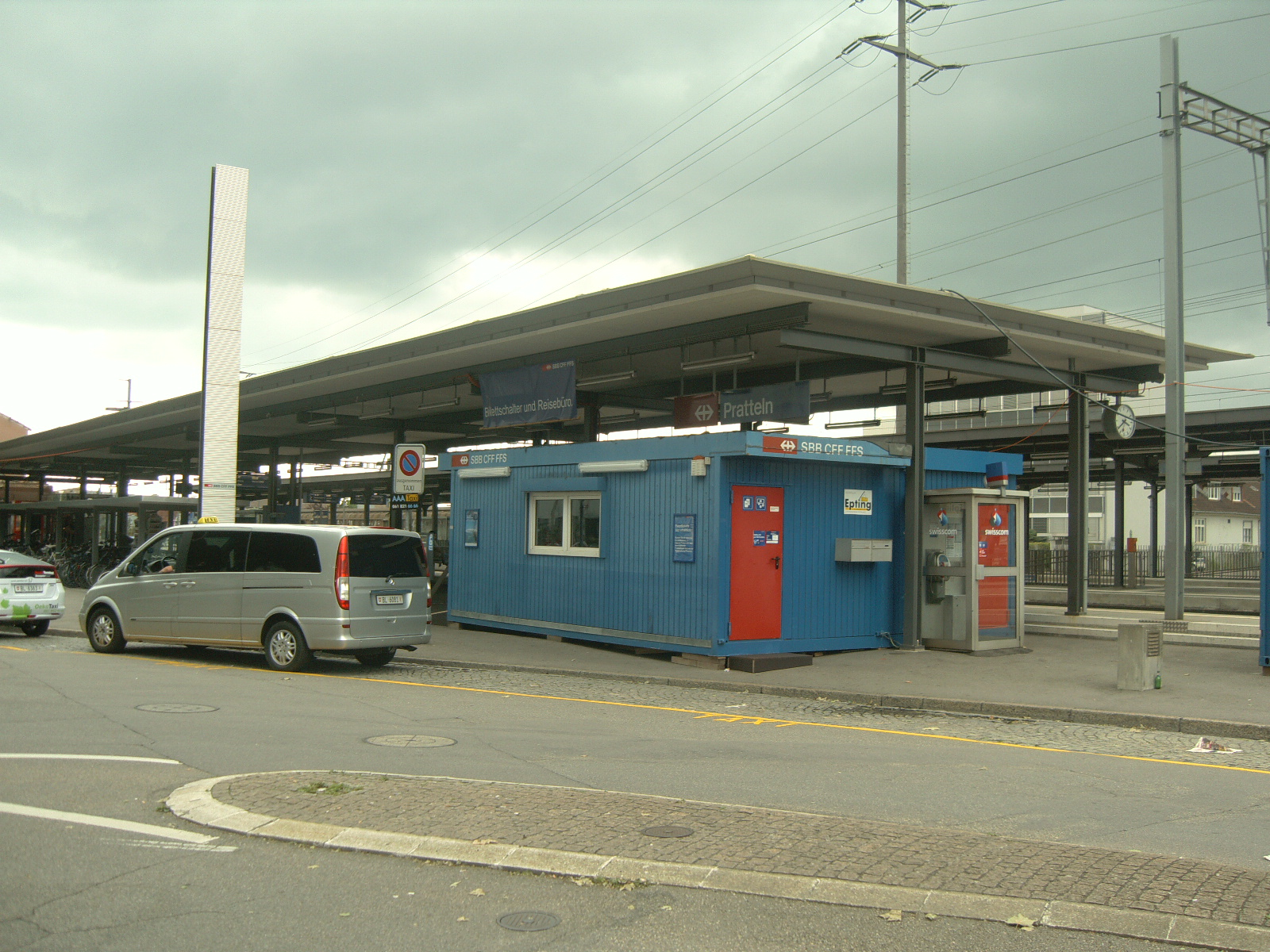
- The station building in 2009

General information
- Location: Pratteln; Switzerland
- Coordinates: 47°31′22″N 7°41′27″E
- Elevation: 289 m (948 ft)
- Owner: Swiss Federal Railways
- Lines: Bözberg line; Hauenstein line
- Distance: 8.3 km (5.2 mi) from Basel SBB
- Train operators: Swiss Federal Railways
- Connections: Trams in Basel: 14; Autobus AG Liestal bus lines

Other information
- Fare zone: 15 (tnw)

Passengers
- 2018: 10,100 per weekday

Services
Preceding station	Basel S-Bahn	Following station
Muttenz towards Basel SBB	S1	Pratteln Salina Raurica towards Laufenburg or Frick
Muttenz towards Basel SBB	S11	Kaiseraugst towards Stein-Säckingen
Muttenz towards Delémont	S3	Frenkendorf-Füllinsdorf towards Olten
Muttenz towards Basel SBB	S33	Frenkendorf-Füllinsdorf towards Sissach
Location
- Location within Switzerland Location within Canton of Basel-Landschaft

Pratteln railway station (German: Bahnhof Pratteln) is a railway station in the municipality of Pratteln, in the Swiss canton of Basel-Landschaft. It is an intermediate stop on the standard gauge Bözberg and Hauenstein lines of Swiss Federal Railways. The 1,000 mm (3 ft 3 3/8 in) Basel–Pratteln railway line terminates 160 metres (520 ft) south of the station, and is served by line 14 of the Basel tram network.

== Services ==
As of the December 2025 timetable change, the following services stop at Pratteln:

- Basel trinational S-Bahn:
  - /: half-hourly or better service between Basel SBB and Stein-Säckingen and hourly service to Frick or Laufenburg.
  - /: service every fifteen minutes to Liestal; every half-hour to Laufen and Olten with additional peak hour service to Sissach; and two trains per day to Delémont.
