= Muttenz =

- Municipality
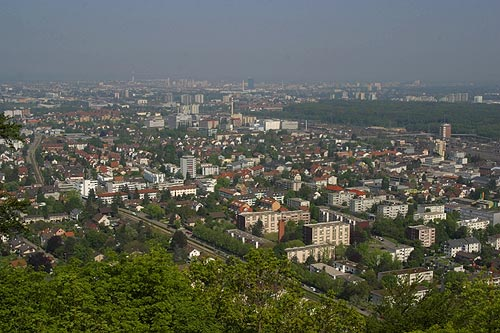
- Muttenz photographed from Wartenberg

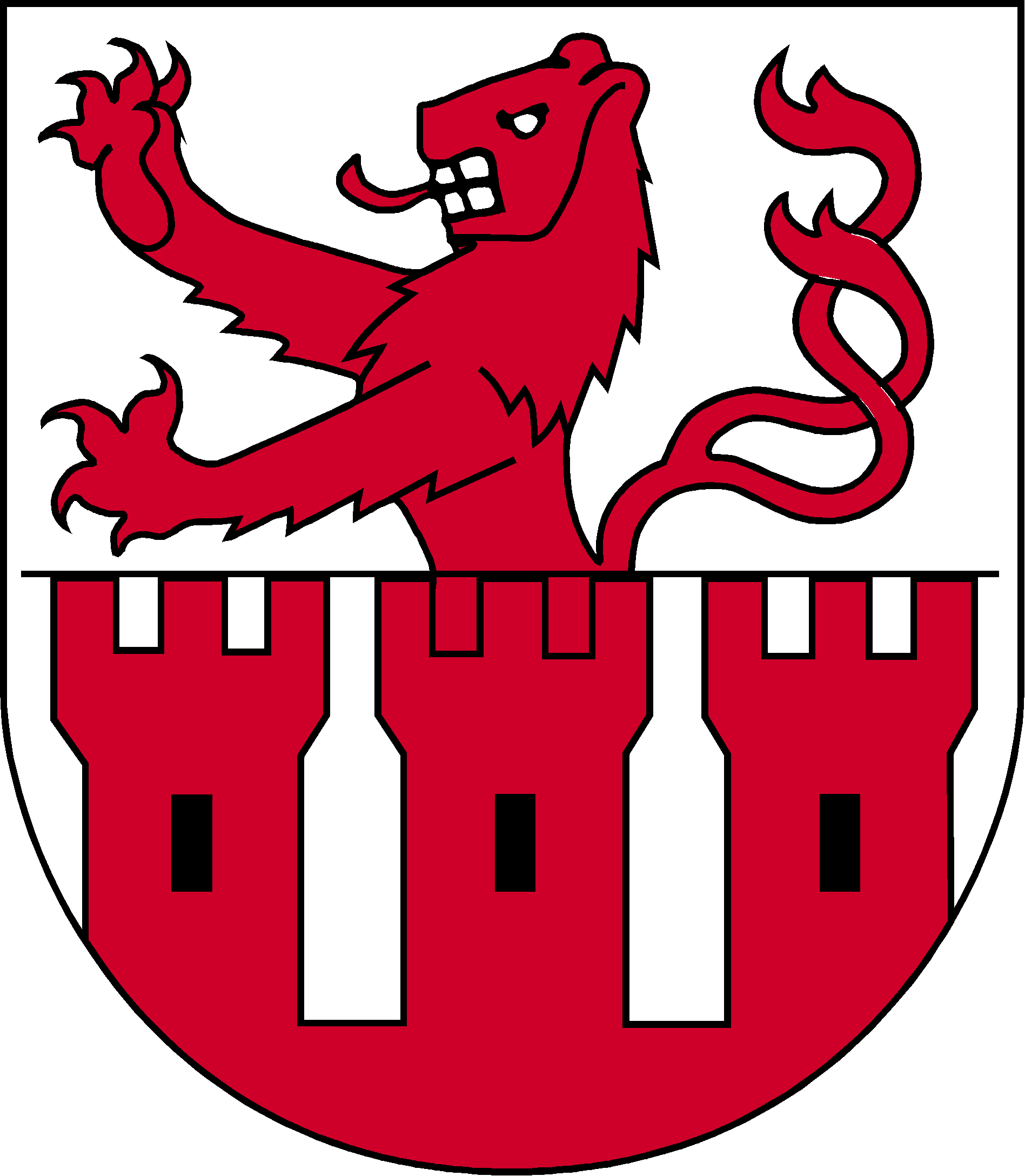
- Coat of arms
- Location of Muttenz
- Location within Switzerland Location within Canton of Basel-Landschaft
- Coordinates: 47°31′N 7°39′E
- Country: Switzerland
- Canton: Basel-Landschaft
- District: Arlesheim

Government
  - Mayor: Peter Vogt

Area
  - Total: 16.64 km^{2} (6.42 sq mi)
- Elevation: 292 m (958 ft)

Population (June 2021)
  - Total: 18,020
  - Density: 1,083/km^{2} (2,805/sq mi)
- Time zone: UTC+01:00 (CET)
  - Summer (DST): UTC+02:00 (CEST)
- Postal code: 4132
- SFOS number: 2770
- ISO 3166 code: CH-BL
- Surrounded by: Arlesheim, Birsfelden, Pratteln, Münchenstein, Gempen (Canton of Solothurn), Basel (Canton of Basel-City) and Grenzach-Wyhlen (Germany)
- Website: www.Muttenz.ch

Muttenz is a municipality with a population of about 17,000 in the canton of Basel-Country in Switzerland. It is in the district of Arlesheim, next to the city of Basel.

== History ==
Under the Roman Empire a hamlet called Montetum existed, which the Alamanni invaders referred to as Mittenza since the 3rd century CE. At the beginning of the 9th century CE the settlement came into the possession of the bishopric of Strasbourg. In the following centuries various noble families were invested with the fief.

Muttenz is first mentioned around 1225–26 as Muttence. In 1277 it was mentioned as Muttenza.

In 1306 the village became the property of the Münch of Münchenstein, who fortified the village church of St. Arbogast with a rampart at the beginning of the 15th century, after their fortresses on the nearby Wartenberg were partially destroyed in the devastating Basel earthquake of 1356. Having fallen on hard times the Münch sold the village and the Wartenberg to the city of Basel in 1517. Following the Protestant Reformation in Basel by Johannes Oecolampadius the church of Muttenz was reformed in 1529.

In 1628 one-seventh of the village population, 112 persons, died of the plague. Many of the villagers, still subjects of the city of Basel, were poor and, from the middle of the 18th century, many emigrated to the Americas. Only in 1790 were the remaining peasants freed from serfdom by a decision of the Great Council of the city of Basel. Following the French Revolution tithes were abolished. After a short civil war between forces of the city and the countryside in 1833 the canton of Basel was divided into the two half-cantons of Basel-City and Basel-Country. Muttenz became part of Basel-Country and remained a peasant village until the beginning of the 20th century, when it began to grow into the small industrialized town it is today.

== Geography ==
Aerial view (1949)

Muttenz has an area, as of 2009, of 16.64 square kilometers (6.42 sq mi). Of this area, 2.67 km^{2} (1.03 sq mi) or 16.0% is used for agricultural purposes, while 6.76 km^{2} (2.61 sq mi) or 40.6% is forested. Of the rest of the land, 6.85 km^{2} (2.64 sq mi) or 41.2% is settled (buildings or roads), 0.34 km^{2} (0.13 sq mi) or 2.0% is either rivers or lakes and 0.01 km^{2} (2.5 acres) or 0.1% is unproductive land.

Of the built up area, industrial buildings made up 8.1% of the total area while housing and buildings made up 14.2% and transportation infrastructure made up 15.0%. Power and water infrastructure as well as other special developed areas made up 1.7% of the area while parks, green belts and sports fields made up 2.2%. Out of the forested land, 38.9% of the total land area is heavily forested and 1.7% is covered with orchards or small clusters of trees. Of the agricultural land, 5.6% is used for growing crops and 8.0% is pastures, while 2.5% is used for orchards or vine crops. All the water in the municipality is flowing water.

The municipality is located in the Arlesheim district, east of Basel. The old village center was between the Rütihard and Wartenberg hills. The modern housing and industrial section is along the Rhine.

== Coat of arms ==
The blazon of the municipal coat of arms is Azure, issuant a Castle with three Towers Gules windowed Sable from which a Semi-lion rampant issuant double-queued of the second.

== Demographics ==
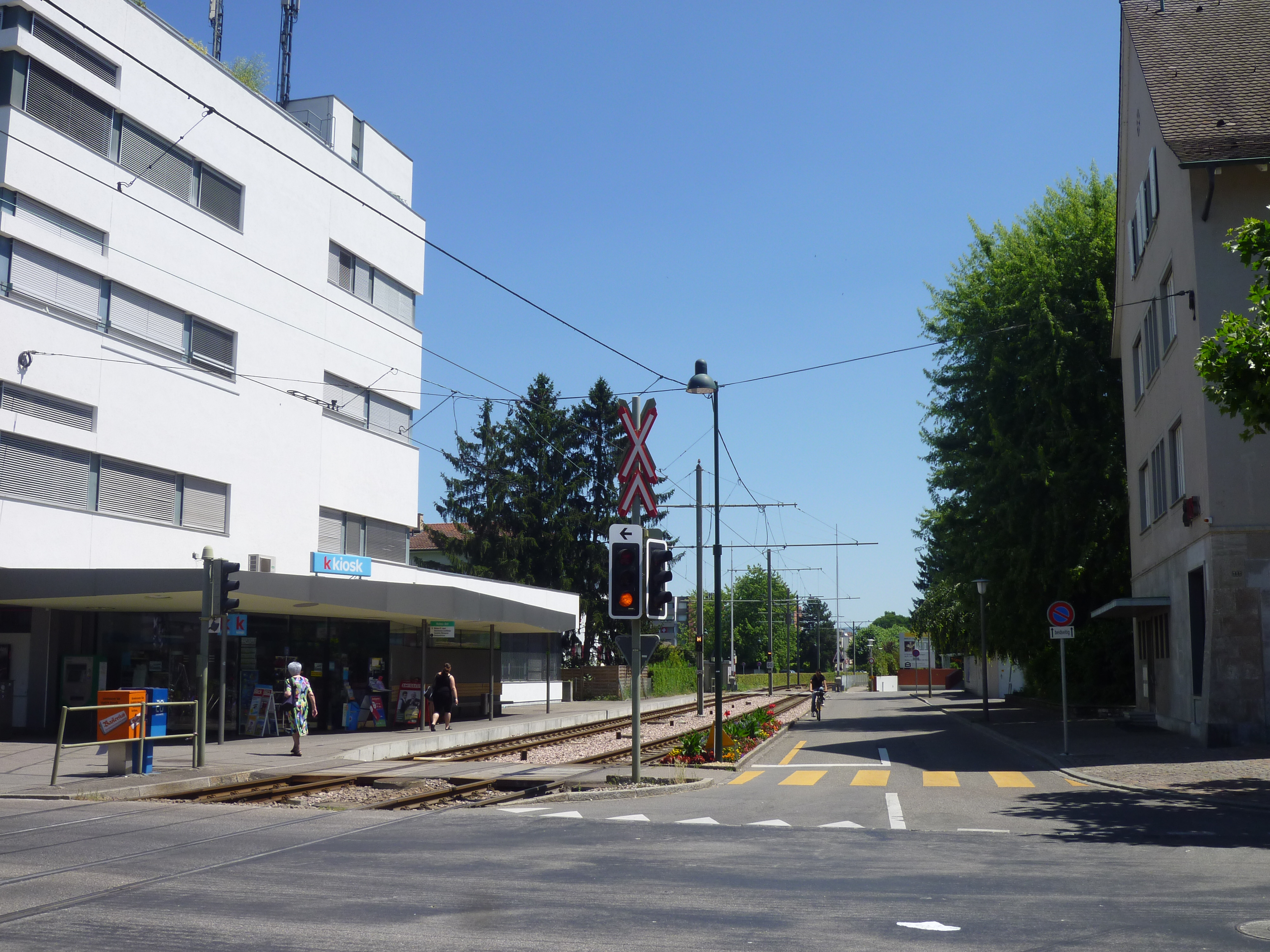
Buildings in Muttenz near a tram stop

Muttenz has a population (as of June 2021) of 18,020. As of 2008, 17.2% of the population are resident foreign nationals. Over the last 10 years (1997–2007) the population has changed at a rate of 2.5%.

Most of the population (as of 2000) speaks German (14,642 or 87.9%), with Italian language being second most common (648 or 3.9%) and French being third (254 or 1.5%). There are 18 people who speak Romansh.

As of 2008, the gender distribution of the population was 48.5% male and 51.5% female. The population was made up of 14,171 Swiss citizens (81.8% of the population), and 3,159 non-Swiss residents (18.2%) Of the population in the municipality 4,137 or about 24.8% were born in Muttenz and lived there in 2000. There were 2,333 or 14.0% who were born in the same canton, while 6,531 or 39.2% were born somewhere else in Switzerland, and 3,136 or 18.8% were born outside of Switzerland.

In 2008 there were 98 live births to Swiss citizens and 26 births to non-Swiss citizens, and in same time span there were 161 deaths of Swiss citizens and 11 non-Swiss citizen deaths. Ignoring immigration and emigration, the population of Swiss citizens decreased by 63 while the foreign population increased by 15. There were 25 Swiss men and 11 Swiss women who emigrated from Switzerland. At the same time, there were 46 non-Swiss men and 49 non-Swiss women who immigrated from another country to Switzerland. The total Swiss population change in 2008 (from all sources, including moves across municipal borders) was an increase of 42 and the non-Swiss population change was an increase of 68 people. This represents a population growth rate of 0.6%.

The age distribution, as of 2010, in Muttenz is; 995 children or 5.7% of the population are between 0 and 6 years old and 2,283 teenagers or 13.2% are between 7 and 19. Of the adult population, 2,030 people or 11.7% of the population are between 20 and 29 years old. 1,997 people or 11.5% are between 30 and 39, 2,756 people or 15.9% are between 40 and 49, and 3,506 people or 20.2% are between 50 and 64. The senior population distribution is 2,676 people or 15.4% of the population are between 65 and 79 years old and there are 1,087 people or 6.3% who are over 80.

As of 2000, there were 6,189 people who were single and never married in the municipality. There were 8,470 married individuals, 1,099 widows or widowers and 896 individuals who are divorced.

As of 2000, there were 7,340 private households in the municipality, and an average of 2.2 persons per household. There were 2,440 households that consist of only one person and 360 households with five or more people. Out of a total of 7,440 households that answered this question, 32.8% were households made up of just one person and 42 were adults who lived with their parents. Of the rest of the households, there are 2,368 married couples without children, 2,045 married couples with children There were 351 single parents with a child or children. There were 94 households that were made up unrelated people and 100 households that were made some sort of institution or another collective housing.

In 2000 there were 2,364 single-family homes (or 68.5% of the total) out of a total of 3,453 inhabited buildings. There were 676 multi-family buildings (19.6%), along with 257 multi-purpose buildings that were mostly used for housing (7.4%) and 156 other use buildings (commercial or industrial) that also had some housing (4.5%). Of the single-family homes 105 were built before 1919, while 244 were built between 1990 and 2000. The greatest number of single-family homes (658) were built between 1946 and 1960.

In 2000 there were 7,768 apartments in the municipality. The most common apartment size was 3 rooms of which there were 2,395. There were 267 single-room apartments and 2,041 apartments with five or more rooms. Of these apartments, a total of 7,219 apartments (92.9% of the total) were permanently occupied, while 378 apartments (4.9%) were seasonally occupied and 171 apartments (2.2%) were empty. As of 2007, the construction rate of new housing units was 2.2 new units per 1000 residents. As of 2000 the average price to rent a two-room apartment was about 800.00 CHF (US$640, £360, €510), a three-room apartment was about 1028.00 CHF (US$820, £460, €660) and a four-room apartment cost an average of 1217.00 CHF (US$970, £550, €780). The vacancy rate for the municipality, in 2008, was 0.31%.

The historical population is given in the following chart:

== Heritage sites of national significance ==
The Au-Hard (Part of the late-Roman era Rhine fortifications), the Freidorf settlement, the Rangierbahnhof (Train Station) and the Reformed Parish Fortified Church of St. Arbogast are listed as Swiss heritage site of national significance. The entire village of Muttenz and the cemetery with surrounding settlements are both listed in the Inventory of Swiss Heritage Sites.

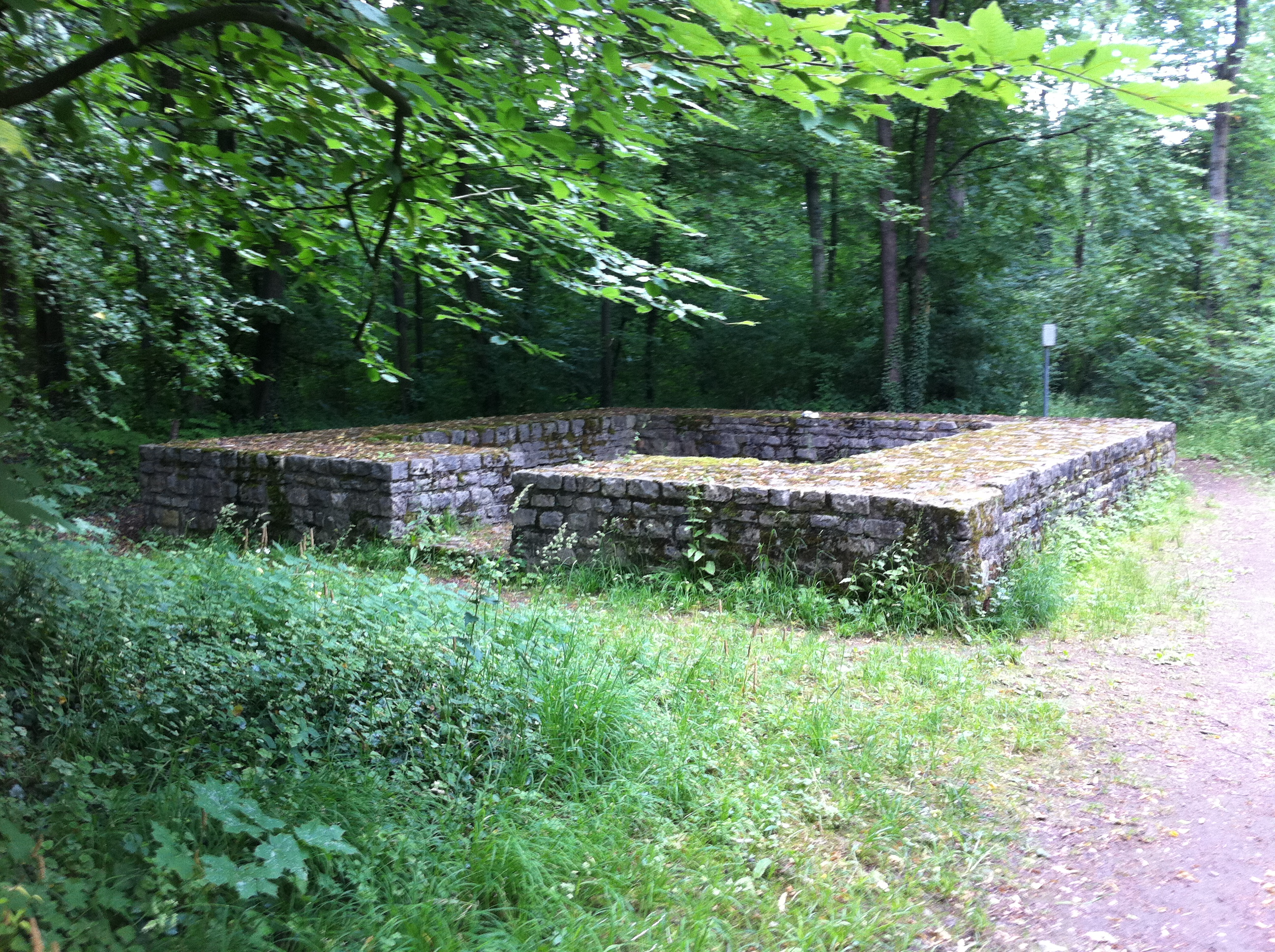
Au-Hard fortifications

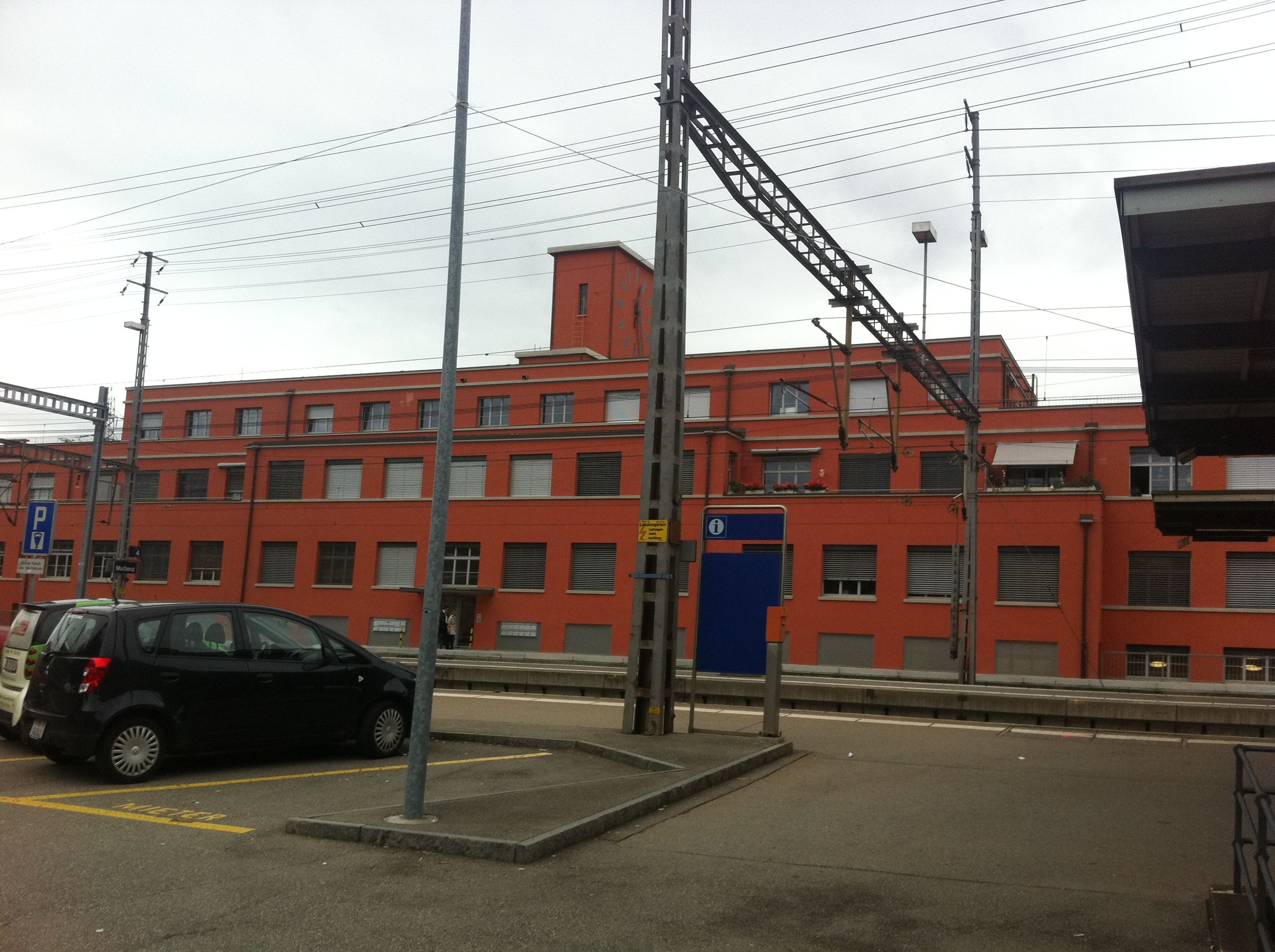
Rangierbahnhof (Train Station)

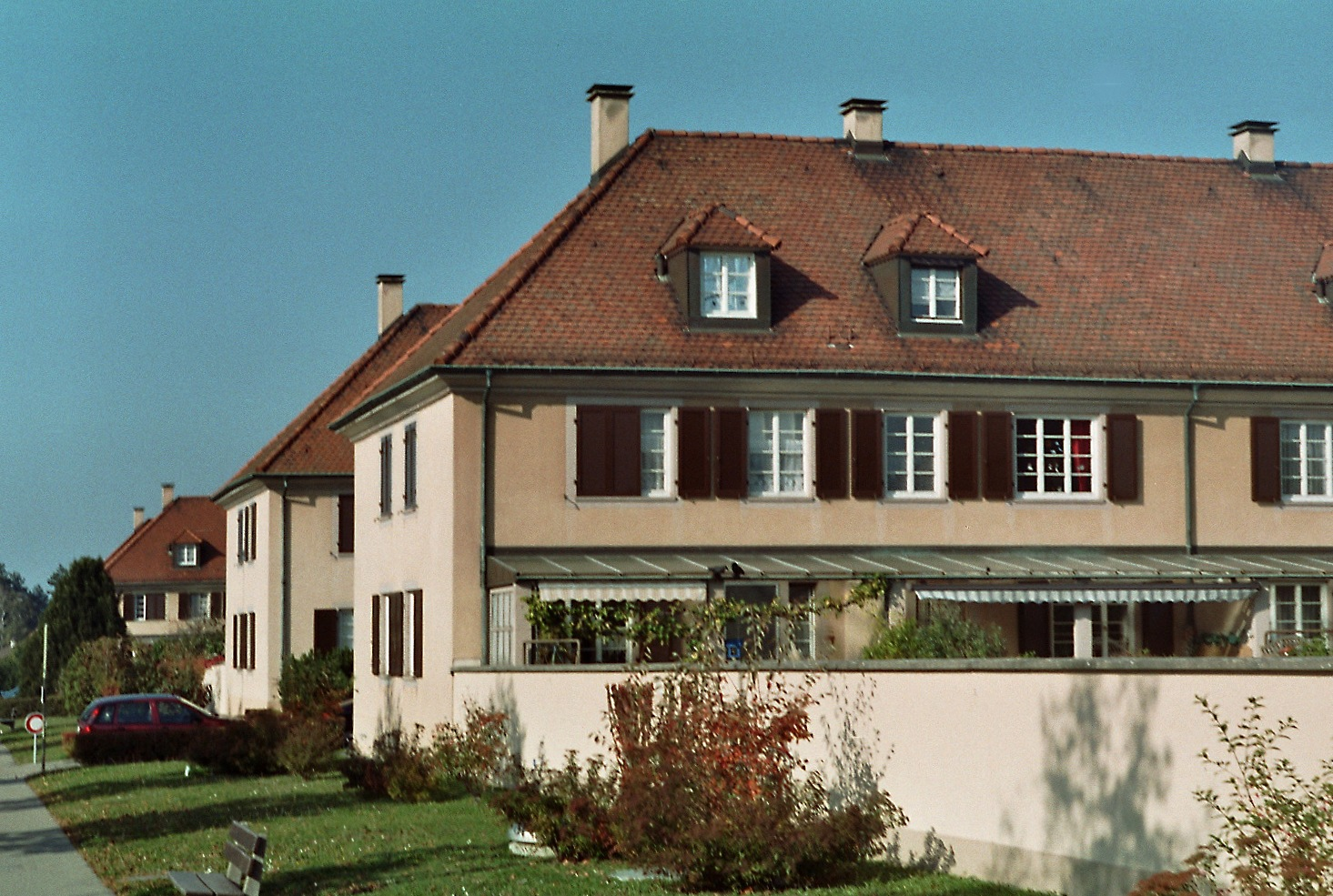
Houses built by Hannes Meyer in 1919, at Freidorf settlement

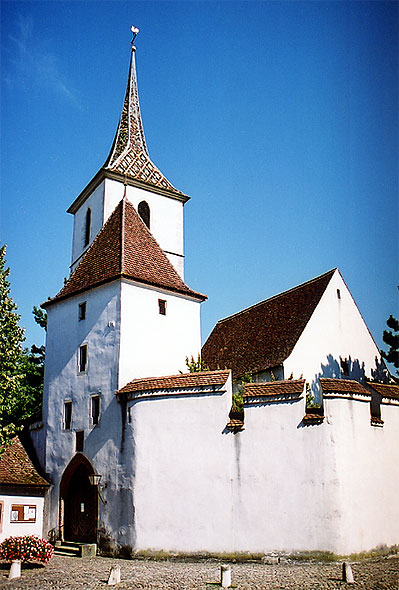
Fortified Church of St Arbogast

=== Wartenberg ===
Built in the Middle Ages, the three fortresses built on the Wartenberg were heavily damaged in the earthquake of 1356, rebuilt in the following decades and later abandoned. They were partially restored in 1955/56.

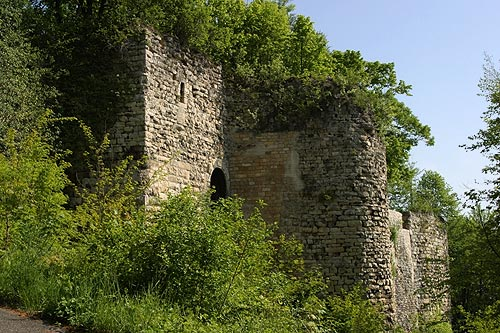
Vordere Wartenberg

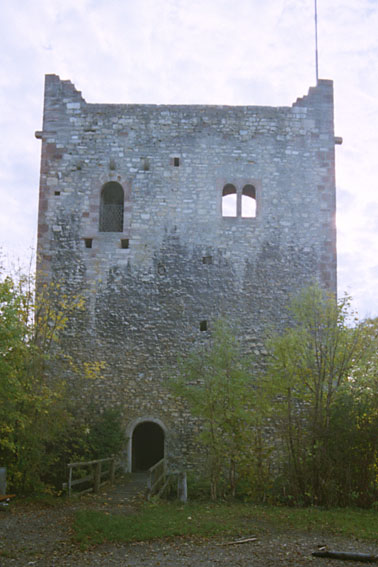
Mittlere Wartenberg

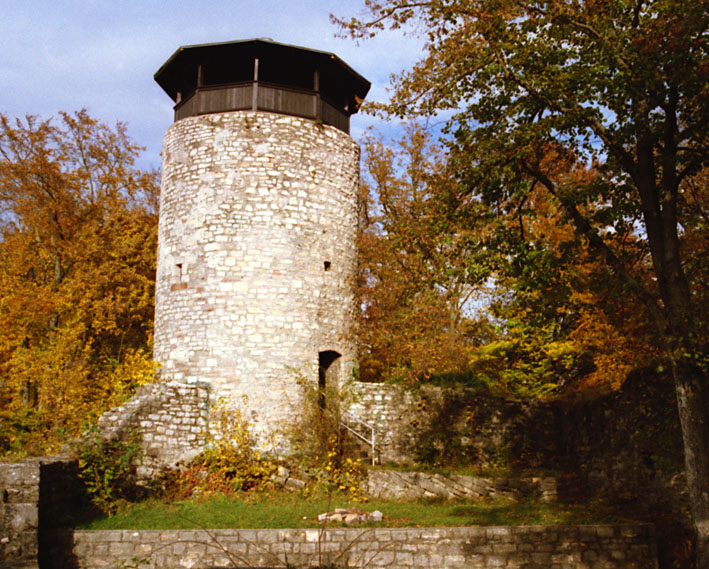
Hintere Wartenberg

=== St. Arbogast ===
The fortified church of St. Arbogast, serving the local evangelical community, was built in the late Middle Ages. Its surrounding seven-metre tall ramparts built in the 15th century are still intact. A charnal house was built adjoining the church in the 15th century. Wall paintings made in 1513 were painted over following the Protestant Reformation, but were restored during a complete renovation in the 1970s. Muttenz was awarded the Wakker Prize for architectural preservation by the Swiss Heritage Society in 1983.

The church is listed as a heritage site of national significance, as is the medieval village core.

=== Freidorf ===
Freidorf is a communal housing estate with 150 buildings built in 1920 by Hannes Meyer (1889–1954), a Bauhaus-affiliated architect. It is also listed as a heritage site of national significance.

== Politics ==
In the 2007 federal election the most popular party was the SP which received 30.59% of the vote. The next three most popular parties were the SVP (27.32%), the FDP (13.79%) and the Green Party (12.37%). In the federal election, a total of 5,850 votes were cast, and the voter turnout was 49.0%.

== Economy ==
As of 2007, Muttenz had an unemployment rate of 2.04%. As of 2005, there were 93 people employed in the primary economic sector and about 22 businesses involved in this sector. 5,170 people were employed in the secondary sector and there were 191 businesses in this sector. 8,902 people were employed in the tertiary sector, with 664 businesses in this sector. There were 8,261 residents of the municipality who were employed in some capacity, of which females made up 43.7% of the workforce.

In 2008 the total number of full-time equivalent jobs was 11,877. The number of jobs in the primary sector was 21, all of which were in agriculture. The number of jobs in the secondary sector was 4,571, of which 3,617 or (79.1%) were in manufacturing, 71 or (1.6%) were in mining and 702 (15.4%) were in construction. The number of jobs in the tertiary sector was 7,285. In the tertiary sector; 1,777 or 24.4% were in wholesale or retail sales or the repair of motor vehicles, 1,536 or 21.1% were in the movement and storage of goods, 287 or 3.9% were in a hotel or restaurant, 133 or 1.8% were in the information industry, 340 or 4.7% were the insurance or financial industry, 1,061 or 14.6% were technical professionals or scientists, 718 or 9.9% were in education and 434 or 6.0% were in health care.

In 2000, there were 12,909 workers who commuted into the municipality and 5,640 workers who commuted away. The municipality is a net importer of workers, with about 2.3 workers entering the municipality for every one leaving. About 15.4% of the workforce coming into Muttenz are coming from outside Switzerland, while 0.3% of the locals commute out of Switzerland for work. Of the working population, 33.7% used public transportation to get to work, and 32.6% used a private car.

== Religion ==
From the 2000 census, 4,844 or 29.1% were Roman Catholic, while 7,126 or 42.8% belonged to the Swiss Reformed Church. Of the rest of the population, there were 135 members of an Orthodox church (or about 0.81% of the population), there were 44 individuals (or about 0.26% of the population) who belonged to the Christian Catholic Church, and there were 709 individuals (or about 4.26% of the population) who belonged to another Christian church. There were 15 individuals (or about 0.09% of the population) who were Jewish, and 670 (or about 4.02% of the population) who were Islamic. There were 72 individuals who were Buddhist, 123 individuals who were Hindu and 18 individuals who belonged to another church. 2,405 (or about 14.44% of the population) belonged to no church, are agnostic or atheist, and 493 individuals (or about 2.96% of the population) did not answer the question.

== Transport ==
Muttenz sits on the Bözberg and Hauenstein lines and is served by the Basel S-Bahn at Muttenz.

== Education ==
In Muttenz about 7,027 or (42.2%) of the population have completed non-mandatory upper secondary education, and 2,305 or (13.8%) have completed additional higher education (either university or a Fachhochschule). Of the 2,305 who completed tertiary schooling, 63.5% were Swiss men, 23.5% were Swiss women, 8.2% were non-Swiss men and 4.8% were non-Swiss women.

As of 2000, there were 1,738 students in Muttenz who came from another municipality, while 448 residents attended schools outside the municipality.

Muttenz is home to 3 libraries. These libraries include; the Bibliothek zum Chutz and two libraries which are part of the Muttenz campus of the Fachhochschule Nordwestschweiz. There were a combined total (as of 2008) of 51,675 books or other media in the libraries, and in the same year a total of 126,508 items were loaned out.

== Notable people ==
- Karl Jauslin (1842 in Muttenz – 1904 in Muttenz) a Swiss painter of history paintings
- Peter Füri (1937 – 2015 in Muttenz) a Swiss football player and manager who played during the 1950s and 1960s

== Twin town ==
- Szigethalom, Hungary, since 2012
