= Muttenz railway station =

Railway station in Muttenz, Switzerland

Muttenz
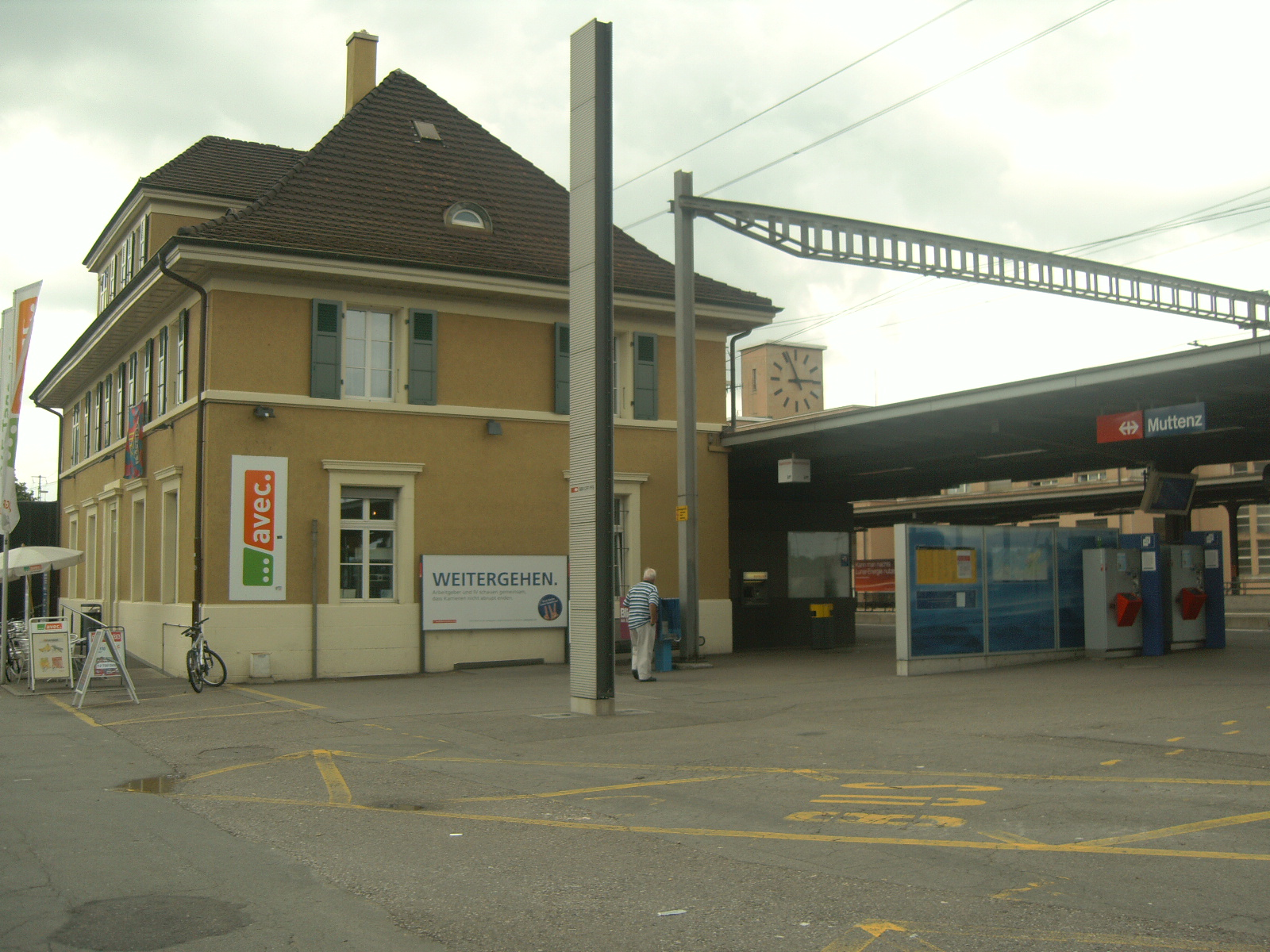
- The station building in 2009

General information
- Location: Muttenz; Switzerland
- Coordinates: 47°32′01″N 7°38′52″E
- Elevation: 280 m (920 ft)
- Owner: Swiss Federal Railways
- Lines: Bözberg line; Hauenstein line
- Distance: 4.8 km (3.0 mi) from Basel SBB
- Train operators: Swiss Federal Railways
- Connections: BVB bus lines

Other information
- Fare zone: 10 (tnw)

Passengers
- 2018: 6,700 per weekday

Services
Preceding station	Basel S-Bahn	Following station
Basel SBB Terminus	S1	Pratteln towards Laufenburg or Frick
Basel SBB Terminus	S11	Pratteln towards Stein-Säckingen
Basel SBB towards Delémont	S3	Pratteln towards Olten
Basel SBB Terminus	S33	Pratteln towards Sissach
Location
- Location within Switzerland Location within Canton of Basel-Landschaft

Muttenz railway station (German: Bahnhof Muttenz) is a railway station in the municipality of Muttenz, in the Swiss canton of Basel-Landschaft. It is an intermediate stop on the Bözberg and Hauenstein lines. East the station is the northwestern portal of the Adler Tunnel, which bypasses two stations and provides a direct route to Liestal.

== Services ==
As of the December 2025 timetable change, the following services stop at Muttenz:

- Basel trinational S-Bahn:
  - /: half-hourly or better service between Basel SBB and Stein-Säckingen and hourly service to Frick or Laufenburg.
  - /: service every fifteen minutes to Liestal; every half-hour to Laufen and Olten with additional peak hour service to Sissach; and two trains per day to Delémont.
