= Eiken railway station =

Railway station in Switzerland

Eiken
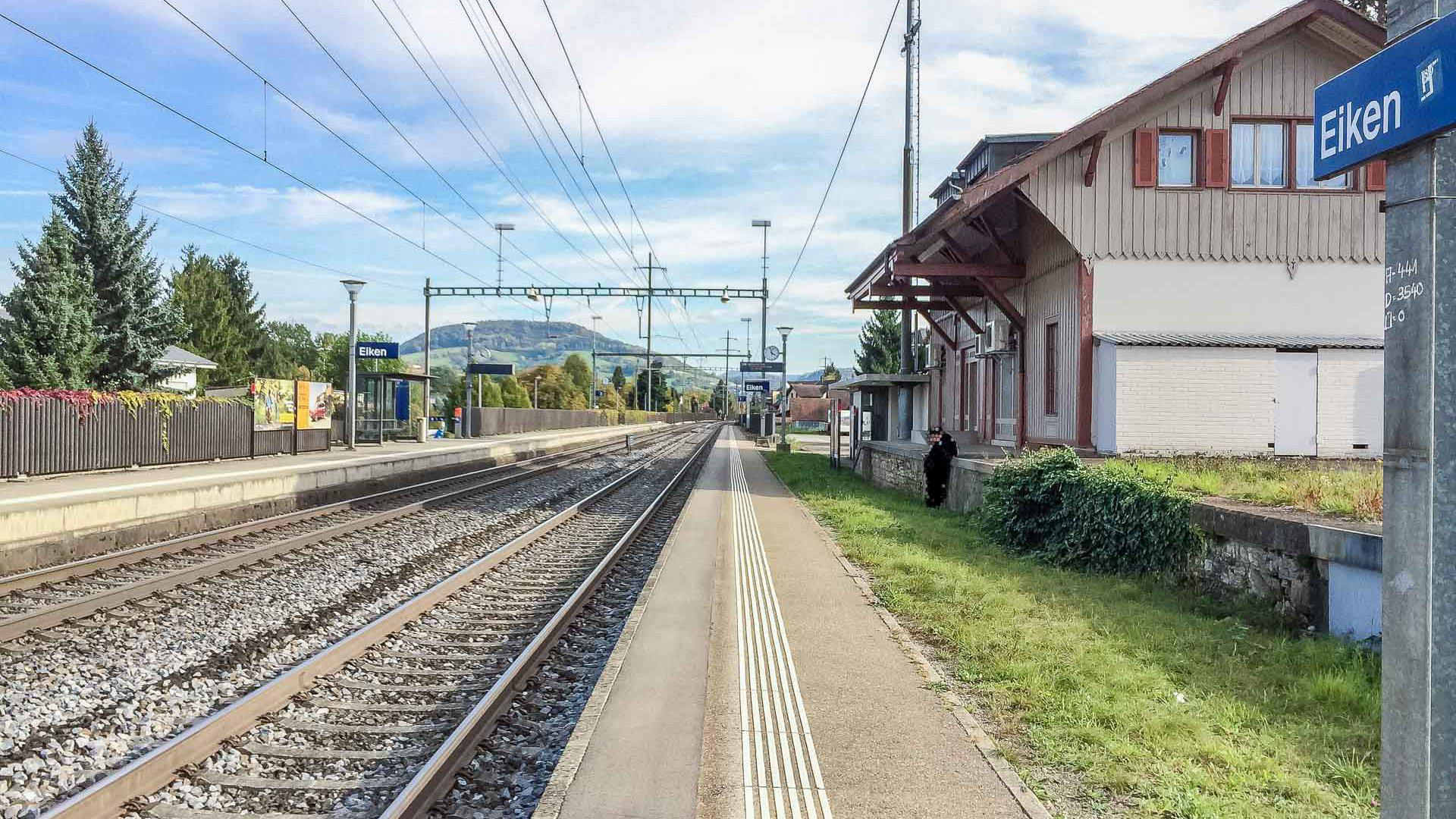
- The tracks and station building in 2017

General information
- Location: Eiken; Switzerland
- Coordinates: 47°31′58.98″N 7°59′24.25″E
- Owner: Swiss Federal Railways
- Line: Bözberg line
- Train operators: Swiss Federal Railways

Services
Preceding station	Basel S-Bahn	Following station
Stein-Säckingen towards Basel SBB	S1	Frick Terminus
Location
- Location within Switzerland

Eiken railway station (German: Bahnhof Eiken) is a railway station in the municipality of Eiken, in the Swiss canton of Aargau. It is an intermediate stop on the Bözberg line and is served by local trains only.

== Services ==
Eiken is served by the S1 the Basel S-Bahn:

- S1: hourly service from Basel SBB to Frick.
