= Ruth Chiquet-Ehrismann =

Swiss biochemist and cell biologist

- Born: 9 November 1954; Zürich, Switzerland
- Died: 4 September 2015 (aged 60); Pratteln, Switzerland
- Education: ETH, Zürich (Ph.D. 1981)
- Known for: Matricellular proteins
- Awards: Huggenberger-Bischoff Prize for Cancer Research, 1990
- Scientific career
- Fields: Biochemistry, cell biology
- Institutions: Johns Hopkins University, Baltimore; Friedrich Miescher Institute for Biomedical Research Basel; University of Basel
- Doctoral advisors: Hans M. Eppenberger; David C. Turner

Ruth Chiquet-Ehrismann (9 November 1954 – 4 September 2015) was a Swiss biochemist and cell biologist working on interactions in the extracellular matrix.

== Life ==
Ruth Chiquet-Ehrismann was born in Zürich. She received her Ph.D. from the ETH Zürich in 1981. Her mentors were Hans M. Eppenberger and David C. Turner. As a postdoctoral fellow she worked with Robert Dottin at the Johns Hopkins University in Baltimore, Maryland, US. In 1984 she joined the Friedrich Miescher Institute for Biomedical Research in Basel as a Junior group leader and was promoted to Senior group leader in 1993.

In 2006 she was appointed as Adjunct Professor (Titularprofessorin) at the University of Basel. She was a board member of the Swiss Cancer League and the Cancer League of Basel, and chaired the Swiss Society for Connective Tissue Research. She served as a Council Member of the International Society for Matrix Biology. At the age of 60, she died suddenly at her home in Pratteln, near Basel.

== Career ==
Ruth Chiquet-Ehrismann's research focused on the influence of the extracellular matrix on cell behavior, a very new field at the time. Today it is recognized that different matrix proteins influence cell adhesion, cell growth and migration, tissue morphology and signal transduction in specific and decisive ways. Chiquet-Ehrismann contributed pioneering work on the tenascin gene family of matricellular proteins, of which some members were discovered, cloned and sequenced by her group. Different tenascins have related domain organisations and their 3-6 subunits oligomerize into star-like structures ("hexabrachion"). Tenascin C interferes with the adhesion of many cells to fibronectin, which led to the concept that it is anti-adhesive. Tenascin C accumulates in the stroma of carcinomas and is a sensitive tumor marker that is involved in cancer metastasis. More recently, Chiquet-Ehrismann and her group discovered roles for tenascin C and tenascin W in stem cell and cancer metastatic niches, and elucidated how tenascin C expression is controlled by the transcription factor MKL1, that links cellular mechanosensation to fibrosis and cancer progression. Chiquet-Ehrismann and her group also discovered the teneurin gene family. These type II trans-membrane proteins are conserved throughout animals and function in germ cell development, neuronal pathfinding and CNS development. The cleaved intracellular domain functions in transcriptional regulation. During 31 years of work at the Friedrich Miescher Institute, Chiquet-Ehrismann guided a very active research group. Many Ph.D. students and postdoctoral fellows emerged from this group, who continue to develop the field of matrix research. She won the Huggenberger-Bischoff Prize for Cancer Research in 1990.

== Key publications ==
- Chiquet-Ehrismann, R., Kalla, P., Pearson, C. A., Beck, K., and Chiquet, M. (1988). Tenascin interferes with fibronectin action. Cell 53, 383–390.
- Spring, J., Beck, K., and Chiquet-Ehrismann, R. (1989). Two contrary functions of tenascin: Dissection of the active sites by recombinant tenascin fragments. Cell 59, 325–334.
- Hendaoui, I., Tucker, R. P., Zingg, D., Bichet, S., Schittny, J., and Chiquet-Ehrismann, R. (2014). Tenascin-C is required for normal Wnt/b-catenin signaling in the whisker follicle stem cell niche. Matrix Biol. 40, 46–53.
- Sivasankaran, B., Degen, M. et al. (2009). Tenascin-C is a novel RBPJkappa-induced target gene for Notch signaling in gliomas. Cancer Res. 69, 458–465.
- Asparuhova, M. B., Feralli, J., Chiquet, M., and Chiquet-Ehrismann, R. (2011). The transcriptional regulator megakaryoblastic leukemia-1 mediates serum response factor-independent activation of tenascin-C transcription by mechanical stress. FASEB J. 25, 3477–34883.
- Baumgartner, S., Martin, D., Hagios, C., and Chiquet-Ehrismann, R. (1994). tenm, a Drosophila gene related to tenascin, is a new pair-rule gene. EMBO J. 13, 3728–3740.
- Rubin, B. P., Tucker, R. P., Martin, D., and Chiquet-Ehrismann, R. (1999). Teneurins, a novel family of neuronal cell surface proteins in vertebrates, homologous to the Drosophila pair-rule gene product Ten-m. Dev. Biol. 216, 195–209.
- Schöler, J., Ferralli, J., Thiry, S., Chiquet-Ehrismann, R. (2015) The intracellular domain of teneurin-1 induces the activity of microphthalmia-associated transcription factor (MITF) by binding to transcriptional repressor HINT1. J Biol Chem. 290, 8154–65.
