= Pratteln =

- Municipality

- Coat of arms
- Location of Pratteln
- Location within Switzerland Location within Canton of Basel-Landschaft
- Coordinates: 47°31′N 7°42′E
- Country: Switzerland
- Canton: Basel-Landschaft
- District: Liestal

Area
  - Total: 10.69 km^{2} (4.13 sq mi)
- Elevation: 296 m (971 ft)

Population (June 2021)
  - Total: 16,621
  - Density: 1,555/km^{2} (4,027/sq mi)
- Time zone: UTC+01:00 (CET)
  - Summer (DST): UTC+02:00 (CEST)
- Postal code: 4133
- SFOS number: 2831
- ISO 3166 code: CH-BL
- Surrounded by: Augst, Frenkendorf, Füllinsdorf, Gempen (SO), Grenzach-Wyhlen (DE-BW), Muttenz
- Website: pratteln.ch

Pratteln (Swiss German: Brattele) is a municipality in the canton of Basel-Landschaft in Switzerland, located in the district of Liestal.

== History ==
Pratteln is first mentioned around 1102-03 as Bratello.

== Geography ==
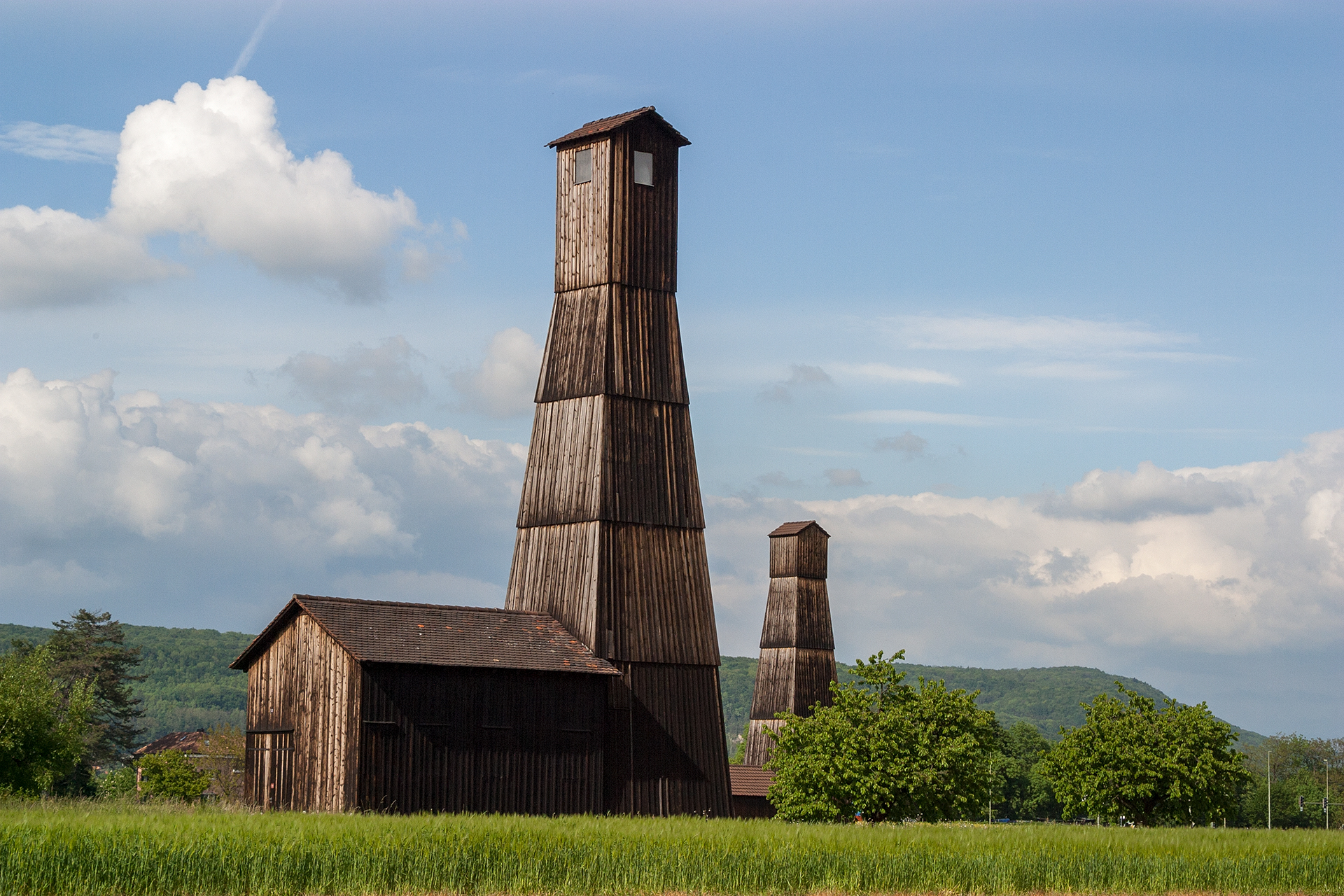
Former salt-drilling towers outside Pratteln

Aerial view from 500 m by Walter Mittelholzer (1922)

Pratteln has an area, as of 2009, of 10.69 square kilometers (4.13 sq mi). Of this area, 2.95 km^{2} (1.14 sq mi) or 27.6% is used for agricultural purposes, while 3 km^{2} (1.2 sq mi) or 28.1% is forested. Of the rest of the land, 4.61 km^{2} (1.78 sq mi) or 43.1% is settled (buildings or roads), 0.1 km^{2} (25 acres) or 0.9% is either rivers or lakes and 0.04 km^{2} (9.9 acres) or 0.4% is unproductive land.

Of the built up area, industrial buildings made up 10.8% of the total area while housing and buildings made up 14.9% and transportation infrastructure made up 11.7%. Power and water infrastructure as well as other special developed areas made up 2.9% of the area while parks, green belts and sports fields made up 2.9%. Out of the forested land, 25.9% of the total land area is heavily forested and 2.2% is covered with orchards or small clusters of trees. Of the agricultural land, 13.8% is used for growing crops and 10.5% is pastures, while 3.4% is used for orchards or vine crops. All the water in the municipality is flowing water.

The municipality is located in the Liestal district. The old, star-shaped village is located at the foot of Mt. Adlerberg. It has expanded down into the Rhine valley, with a new settlement and industrial development.

== Coat of arms ==
The blazon of the municipal coat of arms is Or, an Eagle displayed Sable fesswise, langued, beaked and membered Gules, bordered Sable.

== Demographics ==
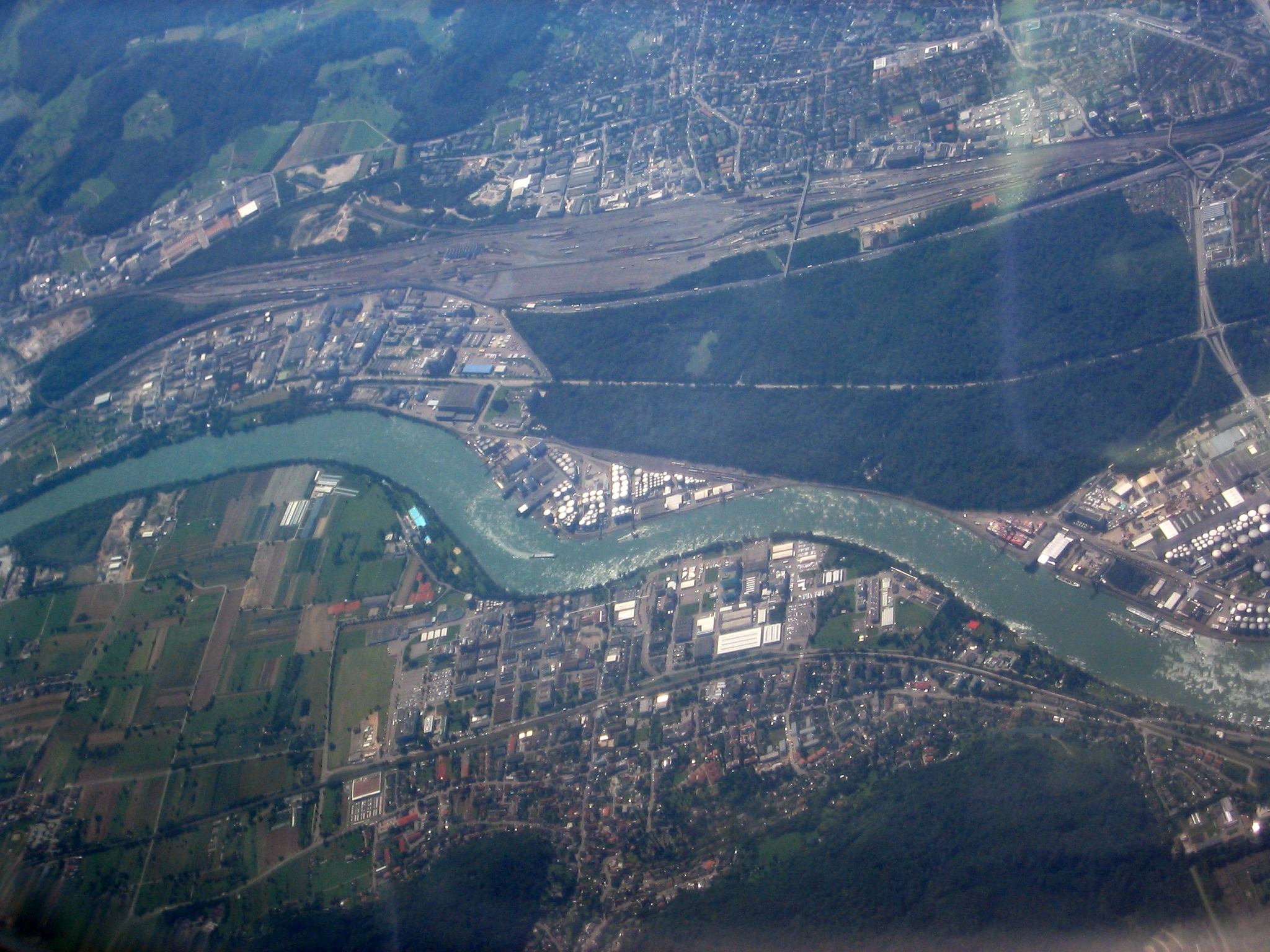
Aerial view of the Rhine, with Pratteln south of the Rhine, in the center left of the view.

Pratteln has a population (as of June 2021) of 16,621. As of 2008, 36.4% of the population are resident foreign nationals. Over the last 10 years (1997–2007) the population has changed at a rate of -0.8%.

Most of the population (as of 2000) speaks German (11,408 or 76.5%), with Italian being second most common (1,071 or 7.2%) and Turkish being third (581 or 3.9%). There are 184 people who speak French and 17 people who speak Romansh.

As of 2008, the gender distribution of the population was 49.7% male and 50.3% female. The population was made up of 9,604 Swiss citizens (63.0% of the population), and 5,634 non-Swiss residents (37.0%) Of the population in the municipality 4,018 or about 27.0% were born in Pratteln and lived there in 2000. There were 1,857 or 12.5% who were born in the same canton, while 3,695 or 24.8% were born somewhere else in Switzerland, and 4,827 or 32.4% were born outside of Switzerland.

In 2008 there were 85 live births to Swiss citizens and 69 births to non-Swiss citizens, and in same time span there were 97 deaths of Swiss citizens and 13 non-Swiss citizen deaths. Ignoring immigration and emigration, the population of Swiss citizens decreased by 12 while the foreign population increased by 56. There was 1 Swiss man and 1 Swiss woman who emigrated from Switzerland. At the same time, there were 66 non-Swiss men and 66 non-Swiss women who immigrated from another country to Switzerland. The total Swiss population change in 2008 (from all sources, including moves across municipal borders) was an increase of 76 and the non-Swiss population increased by 55 people. This represents a population growth rate of 0.9%.

The age distribution, as of 2010, in Pratteln is; 985 children or 6.5% of the population are between 0 and 6 years old and 1,945 teenagers or 12.8% are between 7 and 19. Of the adult population, 2,099 people or 13.8% of the population are between 20 and 29 years old. 2,104 people or 13.8% are between 30 and 39, 2,317 people or 15.2% are between 40 and 49, and 3,118 people or 20.5% are between 50 and 64. The senior population distribution is 2,000 people or 13.1% of the population are between 65 and 79 years old and there are 670 people or 4.4% who are over 80.

As of 2000, there were 5,737 people who were single and never married in the municipality. There were 7,531 married individuals, 792 widows or widowers and 844 individuals who are divorced.

As of 2000, there were 6,467 private households in the municipality, and an average of 2.2 persons per household. There were 2,261 households that consist of only one person and 350 households with five or more people. Out of a total of 6,554 households that answered this question, 34.5% were households made up of just one person and 29 were adults who lived with their parents. Of the rest of the households, there are 1,874 married couples without children, 1,870 married couples with children There were 361 single parents with a child or children. There were 72 households that were made up unrelated people and 87 households that were made some sort of institution or another collective housing.

In 2000 there were 1,410 single family homes (or 60.7% of the total) out of a total of 2,322 inhabited buildings. There were 580 multi-family buildings (25.0%), along with 197 multi-purpose buildings that were mostly used for housing (8.5%) and 135 other use buildings (commercial or industrial) that also had some housing (5.8%). Of the single family homes 143 were built before 1919, while 161 were built between 1990 and 2000. The greatest number of single family homes (268) were built between 1919 and 1945.

In 2000 there were 6,910 apartments in the municipality. The most common apartment size was 3 rooms of which there were 2,404. There were 307 single room apartments and 1,298 apartments with five or more rooms. Of these apartments, a total of 6,349 apartments (91.9% of the total) were permanently occupied, while 374 apartments (5.4%) were seasonally occupied and 187 apartments (2.7%) were empty. As of 2007, the construction rate of new housing units was 2.6 new units per 1000 residents. As of 2000 the average price to rent a two-room apartment was about 765.00 CHF (US$610, £340, €490), a three-room apartment was about 881.00 CHF (US$700, £400, €560) and a four-room apartment cost an average of 1118.00 CHF (US$890, £500, €720). The vacancy rate for the municipality, in 2008, was 0.6%.

The historical population is given in the following chart:

== Sights ==
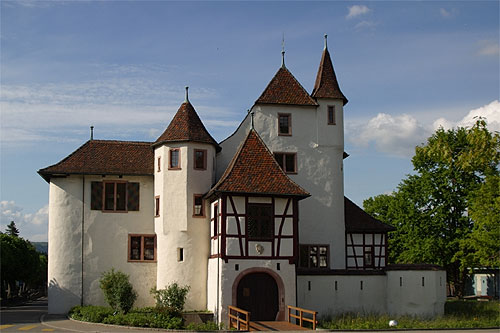
Castle

The entire village of Pratteln is designated as part of the Inventory of Swiss Heritage Sites.

== Politics ==
In the 2007 federal election the most popular party was the SVP which received 30.83% of the vote. The next three most popular parties were the SP (28.54%), the FDP (15.63%) and the Green Party (13.89%). In the federal election, a total of 3,612 votes were cast, and the voter turnout was 44.8%.

== Economy ==
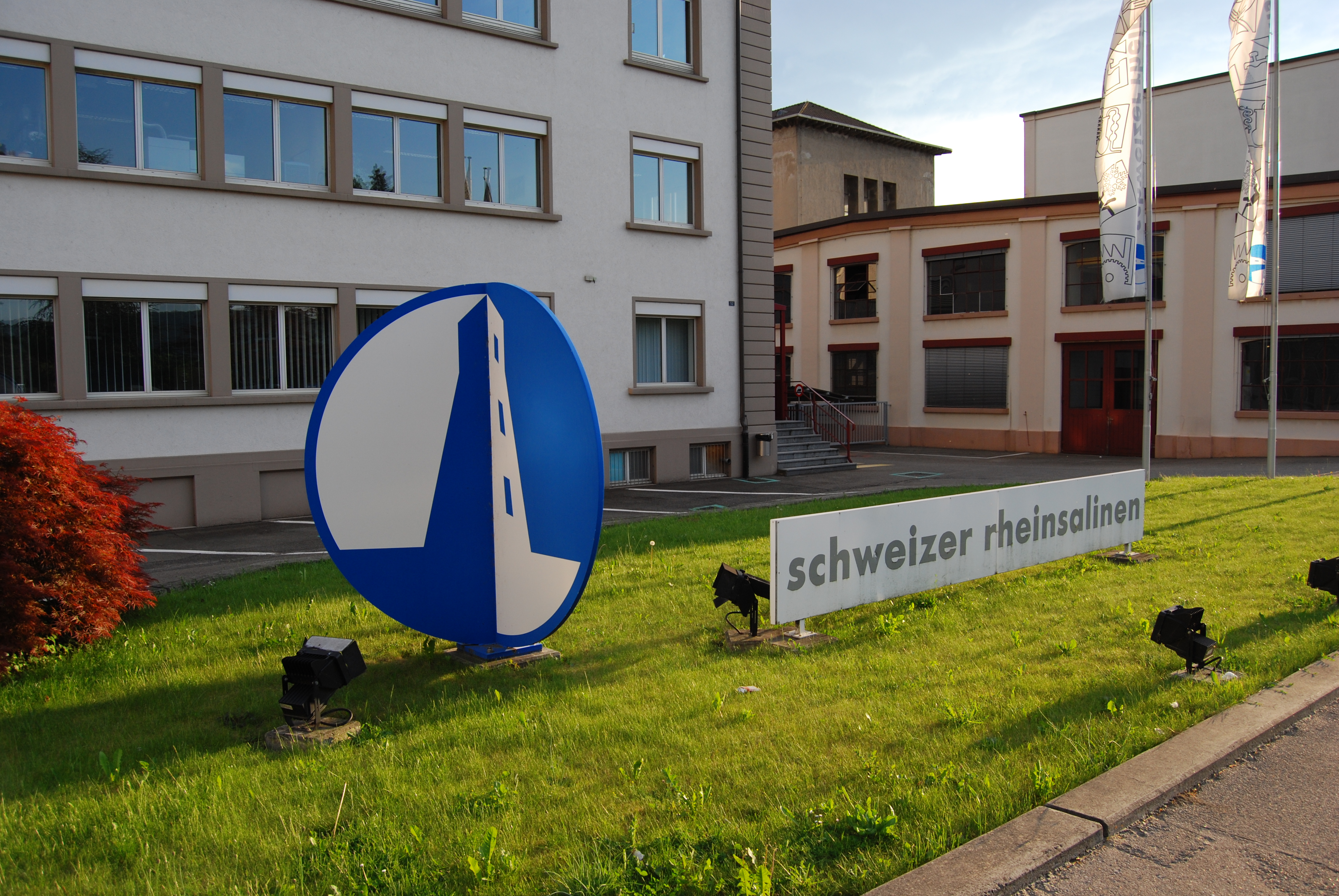
The Schweizer Rheinsalinen in Schweizerhalle, Pratteln

As of 2007, Pratteln had an unemployment rate of 3.57%. As of 2005, there were 87 people employed in the primary economic sector and about 21 businesses involved in this sector. 2,901 people were employed in the secondary sector and there were 146 businesses in this sector. 5,991 people were employed in the tertiary sector, with 543 businesses in this sector. There were 7,708 residents of the municipality who were employed in some capacity, of which females made up 43.7% of the workforce.

In 2008 the total number of full-time equivalent jobs was 9,236. The number of jobs in the primary sector was 36, of which 28 were in agriculture and 8 were in forestry or lumber production. The number of jobs in the secondary sector was 3,175, of which 1,984 or (62.5%) were in manufacturing, 102 or (3.2%) were in mining and 970 (30.6%) were in construction. The number of jobs in the tertiary sector was 6,025. In the tertiary sector; 1,884 or 31.3% were in wholesale or retail sales or the repair of motor vehicles, 1,780 or 29.5% were in the movement and storage of goods, 322 or 5.3% were in a hotel or restaurant, 197 or 3.3% were in the information industry, 81 or 1.3% were the insurance or financial industry, 653 or 10.8% were technical professionals or scientists, 221 or 3.7% were in education and 376 or 6.2% were in health care.

In 2000, there were 9,477 workers who commuted into the municipality and 5,136 workers who commuted away. The municipality is a net importer of workers, with about 1.8 workers entering the municipality for every one leaving. About 20.4% of the workforce coming into Pratteln are coming from outside Switzerland, while 0.1% of the locals commute out of Switzerland for work. Of the working population, 28.1% used public transportation to get to work, and 37.7% used a private car.

== Religion ==
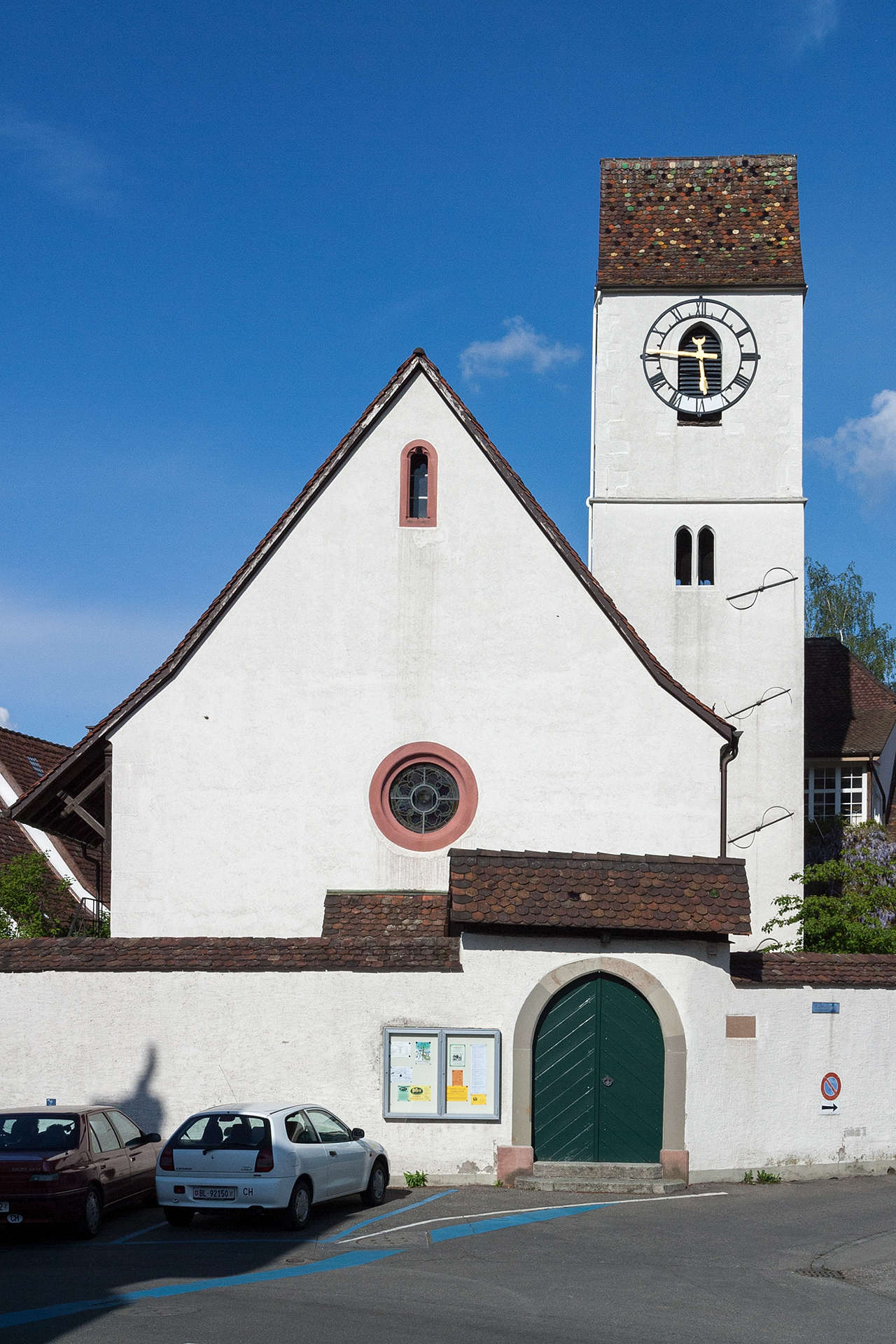
Church in Pratteln

From the 2000 census, 4,319 or 29.0% were Roman Catholic, while 5,202 or 34.9% belonged to the Swiss Reformed Church. Of the rest of the population, there were 607 members of an Orthodox church (or about 4.07% of the population), there were 52 individuals (or about 0.35% of the population) who belonged to the Christian Catholic Church, and there were 279 individuals (or about 1.87% of the population) who belonged to another Christian church. There were 5 individuals (or about 0.03% of the population) who were Jewish, and 1,691 (or about 11.35% of the population) who were Islamic. There were 43 individuals who were Buddhist, 47 individuals who were Hindu and 14 individuals who belonged to another church. 2,016 (or about 13.53% of the population) belonged to no church, are agnostic or atheist, and 629 individuals (or about 4.22% of the population) did not answer the question.

== Education ==
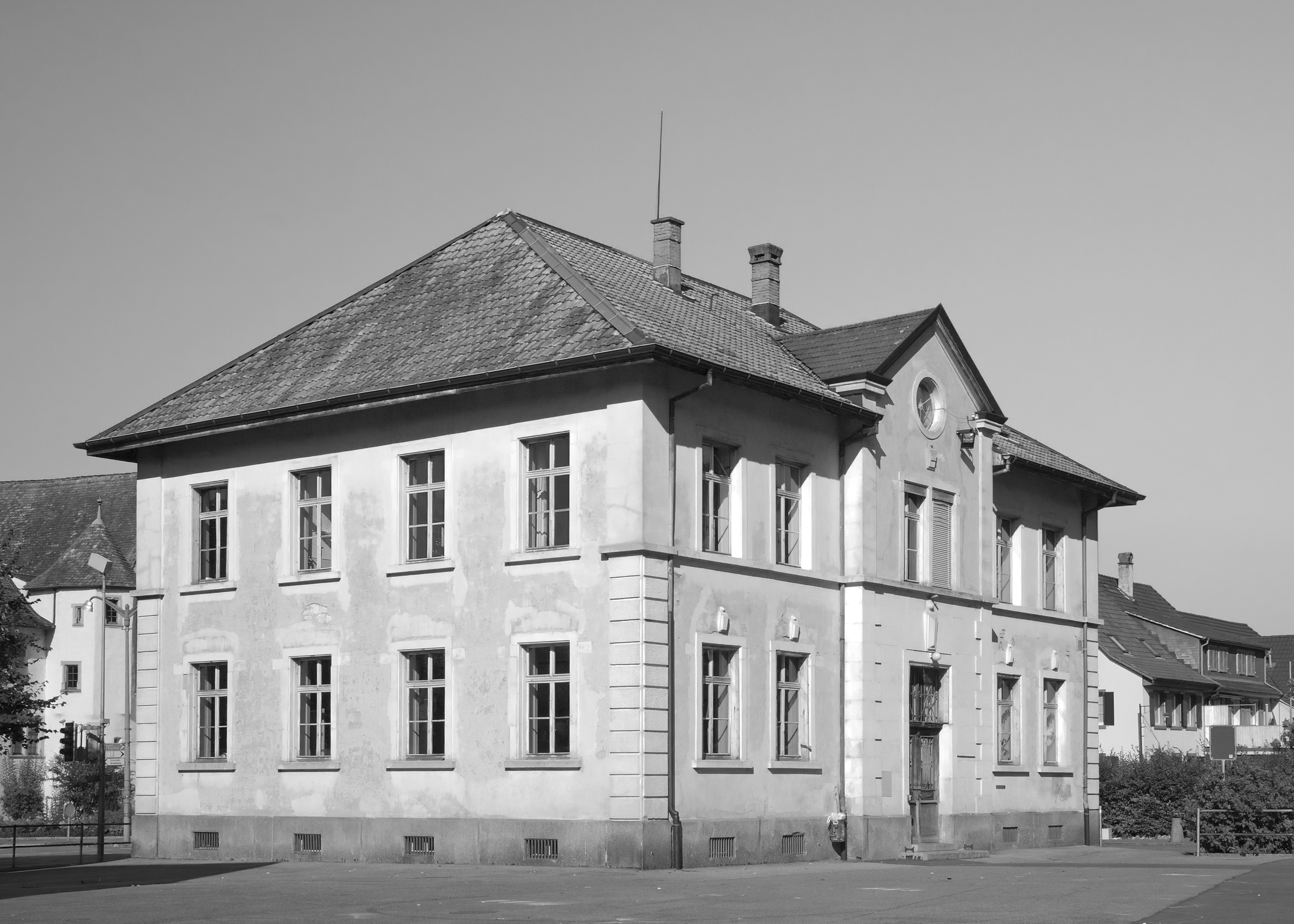
Old school house in Pratteln

In Pratteln about 5,160 or (34.6%) of the population have completed non-mandatory upper secondary education, and 1,407 or (9.4%) have completed additional higher education (either university or a Fachhochschule). Of the 1,407 who completed tertiary schooling, 59.6% were Swiss men, 20.9% were Swiss women, 12.6% were non-Swiss men and 6.9% were non-Swiss women.

As of 2000, there were 358 students in Pratteln who came from another municipality, while 452 residents attended schools outside the municipality.

Pratteln is home to the Gemeindebibliothek Pratteln (municipal library of Pratteln).

== Transportation ==
The municipality is located on the A3 motorway.

Pratteln sits on the Bözberg and Hauenstein lines and is served by the Basel S-Bahn at Pratteln and Pratteln Salina Raurica.

== Notable people ==
- Ruth Chiquet-Ehrismann (1954 – 2015 in Pratteln), a biochemist and cell biologist working on interactions in the extracellular matrix
- Max Mangold (1922 in Pratteln – 2015), a German linguist and phonetician of Swiss origin, a leading authority on the pronunciation of German
- Werner Pfirter (1946 in Pratteln – 1973), a Swiss professional Grand Prix motorcycle road racer
- Jörg Stohler (born 1949 in Pratteln), a former Swiss international footballer
