= Möhlintal =

Valley in Aargau, Switzerland

Coordinates: 47°31′12″N 7°54′40″E

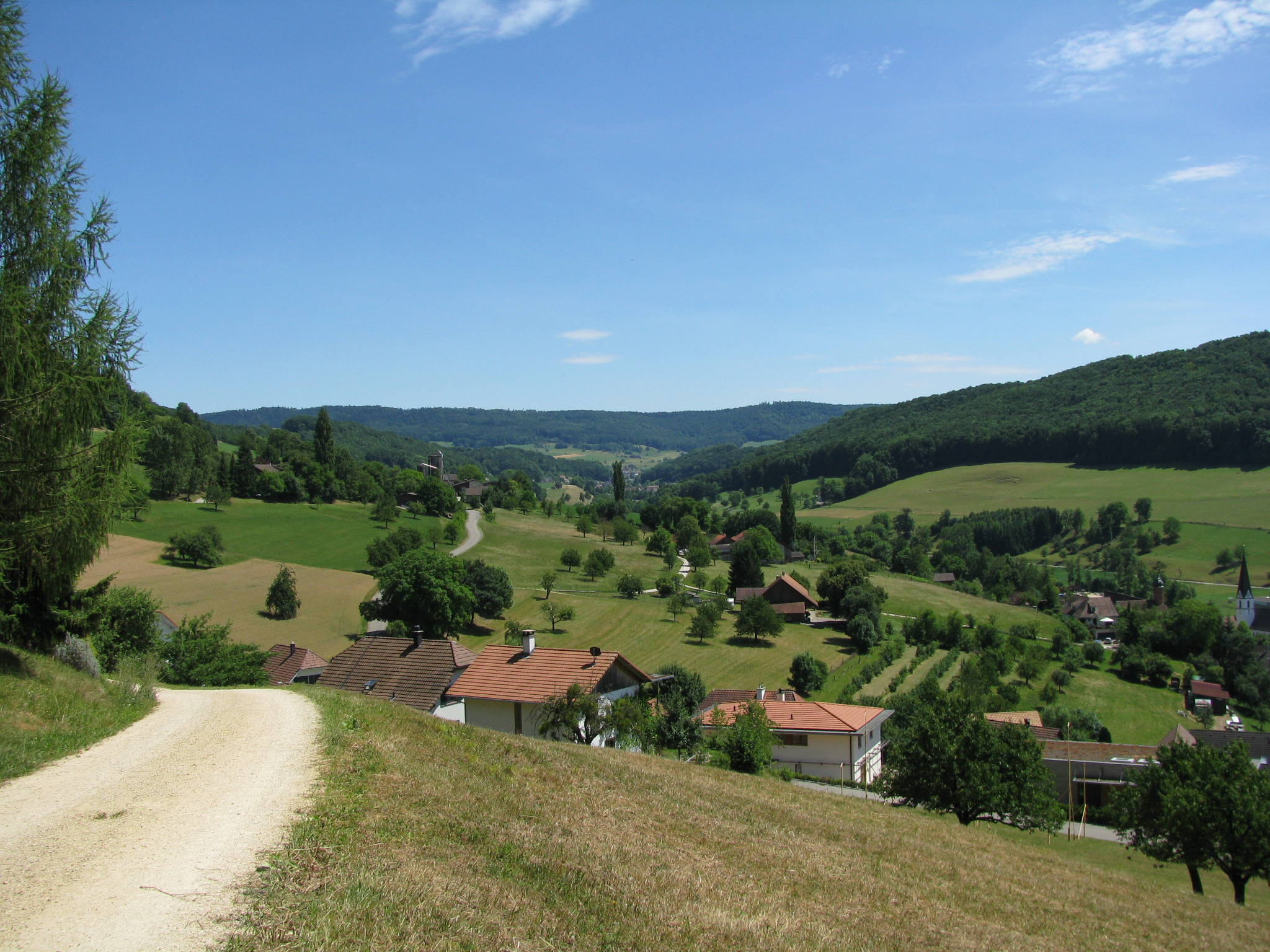
The Möhlintal at Zuzgen

The Möhlintal is a 10-kilometre long valley running between Möhlin and Wegenstetten in the Rheinfelden district of Canton Aargau, Switzerland. The five municipalities in the valley (Möhlin, Zeiningen, Zuzgen, Hellikon and Wegenstetten) have a total population of around 14,000 people.

The upper part of the valley is also known as the "Wegenstettertal". This name was particularly used by associations and groups related to the upper Möhlintal municipalities. In Habsburg times the area was known as Landschaft (territory) Möhlinbach. The valley was also sometimes known as the "Chläfflital". The official name of the valley given by Canton Aargau is "Möhlintal".

== Location and description ==
The valley lies in the North Eastern Tabel Jura, part of the Swiss Jura Mountains which are distinct from the Faltenjura because the strata are not folded. The Möhlintal runs in a practically straight line from Southeast to Northwest, surrounded by high table plateaux through which the valley cuts. The Möhlinbach flows from its source at the top of the valley between the municipalities of Wegenstetten and Hemmiken (at a height of 520m), through the valley to join the Rein near Möhlin (at 280m).

Like most other Jura valleys in the Fricktal region, the Möhlintal has a relatively narrow valley floor. Because of its climatic circumstances, the valley experiences up to 40 days more sunshine than the Swiss Plateau and is mostly fog-free. On 5 August 2003 the private weather service Meteomedia recorded a temperature of 40.3 °C in Möhlin, a record for Switzerland.

Thanks to the relatively mild climate and also the wind shielded location, the Möhlintal is suitable for vineyards. On the south side of the Zeinigerberges near Zeiningen the Spätburgunder (Zeininger Pinot Noir, red wine) and Müller-Thurgau (Zeininger Riesling x Sylvaner, white wine) vineyards are located. On the valley floor, sides and flat hill summits intensive farming is performed. Particularly important for the Möhlintal is the production of Kirsch from cherries. The "Chriesiberg" near Zuzgen derives its name from the cherry trees that stand on its plateau. "Fricktaler Kirsch" is a widely known product.

On the Northeastern side of the valley lies the Looberg-Wabrig-Hersberg high plateau that is bordered on the other side by the parallel running Fischingertal. On this high plateau the Fricktal-Schupfart Aerodrome is located where each year the Schupfart Festival is held. The small winter sports area of Föhrlimatt in Wegenstetten lies on the west flank of the Tiersteinberg has one ski lift and attracts high numbers of visitors from the region through the winter season.

Statistical data

- Area: 5,272 Hektars (52.72 km²), of which:
  - 51 % Farmed
  - 37 % Forest
  - 11 % Housing
- Population: 14,194 (31 December 2007)
- Population Density: 269 people/km² (31 December 2007)

== History ==
=== Landschaft Möhlinbach ===
The Landschaft Möhlinbach was, like the rest of Fricktal a beneficiary of affiliation with Vorderösterreich through a lower administrative unit, the Kameralherrschaft Rheinfelden which in turn was affiliated to the Oberamt Breisgau. The Landschaft Möhlinbach encompassed the villages of Hellikon, Kaiseraugst, Magden, Möhlin, Mumpf, Olsberg, Wallbach, Wegenstetten, Zeiningen and Zuzgen. The villagers of the Landschaft Möhlinbach were the trigger for the Rappenkkrieg.

== Population ==
The Möhlintal shows a religious anomaly: Mohlin has the highest Swiss-wide population of Christ Catholics (around 1,000) and Hellikon has the highest proportion of Christ Catholics (around 20%). Christ Catholic churches and/or chapels are found in Hellikon, Möhlin and Zuzgen.

== Transport ==
The Möhlintal can be travelled in half an hour using the PostAuto Nordschweiz line 89 (Möhlin - Wegenstetten). In Wegenstetten the bus line 101 (Gelterkinden–Hemmiken–Wegenstetten) terminates, connecting the Möhlintal with the neighbouring Canton Basel Land. An infrequent bus route also connects Wegenstetten with the Fischingertal (via Fricktal-Schupfart Aerodrome). Möhlin railway station stands on the Basel-Zürich line. The station is served by the S1 route of the Regio S-Bahn Basel that runs from Mulhouse in France, through Basel and terminates in either Frick or Laufenburg. The A3 motorway crosses the Möhlintal on a viaduct at Zeiningen. The nearest interchanges are located at Rheinfelden (around 3 km West of Möhlin) or Eiken (around 7 km Northeast from Wegenstetten).

Along the high plateau between Möhlintal and Fischingertal runs part of the Fricktaler Höhenweg, a regional walking route.
