= Zuzgen =

- Municipality
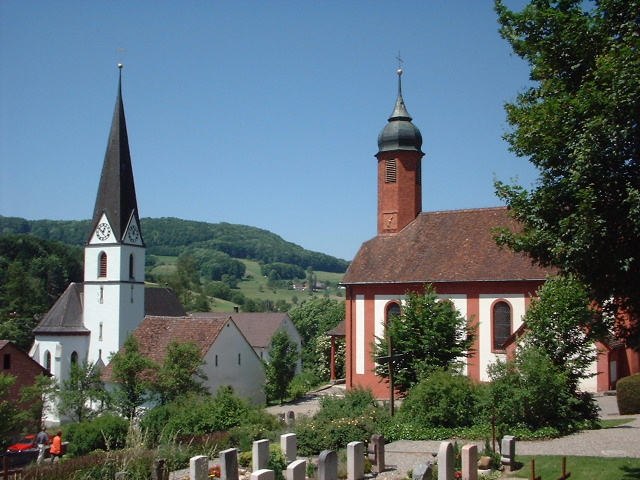

- Flag Coat of arms
- Location of Zuzgen
- Location within Switzerland Location within Canton of Aargau
- Coordinates: 47°31′N 7°54′E
- Country: Switzerland
- Canton: Aargau
- District: Rheinfelden

Area
  - Total: 8.40 km^{2} (3.24 sq mi)
- Elevation: 382 m (1,253 ft)

Population (December 2007)
  - Total: 814
  - Density: 96.9/km^{2} (251/sq mi)
- Time zone: UTC+01:00 (CET)
  - Summer (DST): UTC+02:00 (CEST)
- Postal code: 4315
- SFOS number: 4264
- ISO 3166 code: CH-AG
- Localities: Lohnberg, Erfleten
- Surrounded by: Buus (BL), Obermumpf, Mumpf, Zeiningen, Hellikon
- Twin towns: N/A
- Website: www.zuzgen.ch

Zuzgen (Swiss German: [ˈtsʊtsɡə]) is a municipality in the Rheinfelden District of canton Aargau in Switzerland. It is located in the West of the Fricktal region, around three kilometers southwest of the border with Germany, and has a border with Canton Basel-Landschaft.

== Geography ==
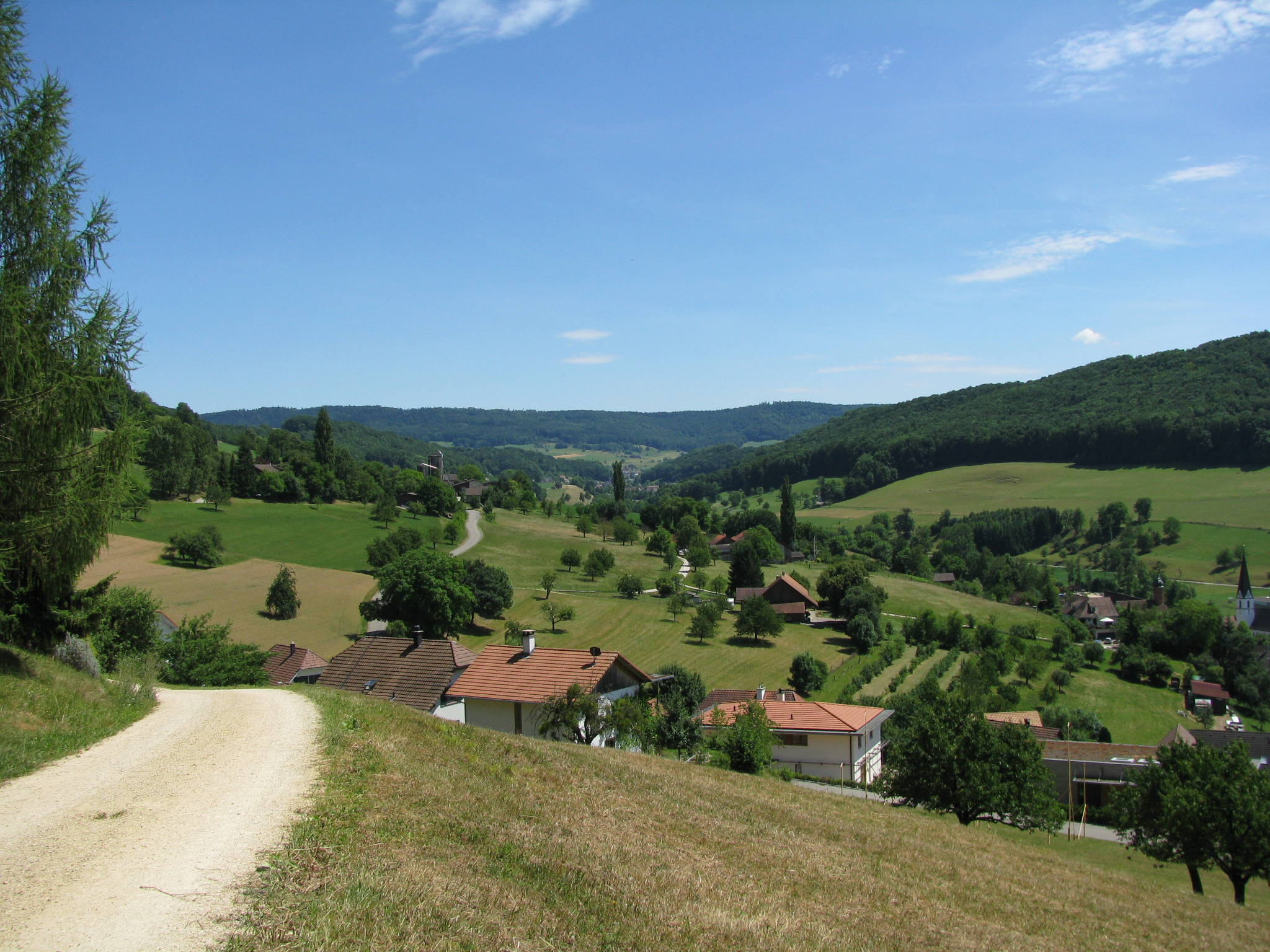
Moehlintal near Zuzgen

The village lies in the mid-reaches of the Möhlin valley (Möhlintal) through which flows the Möhlinbach in a northwesterly direction towards the Rhine. The flat valley floor alongside the Möhlinbach is, on average, close to 200 meters wide and is bordered on both sides by the hills of the Tabel Jura (Tafeljura) which have very steep lower slopes leading to flat upper plateau's that are intensively farmed.

In the North the almost circular Chriesiberg (558m) is found and in the East lies the Lohnberg (581 m) with a hamlet of the same name. This flat plateau is around one kilometer wide and stretches for over four kilometers to the southwest (known as the Wabrig plateau above Hellikon and the Hersberg above Wegenstetten). The two-kilometer-long Reckental stretches to the south of the village. To the west lies a further plateau where the hamlet of Erfleten is found.

Zuzgen has an area, as of 2009, of 8.39 square kilometers (3.24 sq mi). Of this area, 4.97 km^{2} (1.92 sq mi) or 59.2% is used for agricultural purposes, while 2.89 km^{2} (1.12 sq mi) or 34.4% is forested. Of the rest of the land, 0.45 km^{2} (0.17 sq mi) or 5.4% is settled (buildings or roads), 0.01 km^{2} (2.5 acres) or 0.1% is either rivers or lakes.

Of the built-up area, housing and buildings made up 3.2% and transportation infrastructure made up 1.7%. Out of the forested land, 33.0% of the total land area is heavily forested and 1.4% is covered with orchards or small clusters of trees. Of the agricultural land, 29.4% is used for growing crops and 26.5% is pastures, while 3.3% is used for orchards or vine crops. All the water in the municipality is flowing water.

The highest point is found on the southern border of the municipality (637 m (2,090 ft)) and the lowest at the Möhlinbach (360 m (1,180 ft)).

Neighbouring villages in Canton Aargau are Zeiningen to the Northwest, Mumpf to the North, Obermumpf to the Northeast, and Hellikon to the Southeast. To the Southwest the municipality borders Buus in Canton Baselland.

== History ==
Aerial view from 3000 m by Walter Mittelholzer (1923)

The area around Zuzgen is known to be settled in Roman times; coins and the remains of a wall provide evidence. The Alemanni (an alliance of Germanic tribes) left their mark with well-preserved graves. The first documented mention of Zuzchon dates from 10 June 1288 in a charter of the Sovereign Military Order of Malta command in Rheinfelden. The village name may have its origins from an Alamanni tribal leader called Zuzo. An important early landowner was the monastery of Bad Säckingen.

The first known rulers were Habsburgers. After the Waldshut war of 1468 the whole Fricktal was pledged to the Duchy of Burgundy. The Burgundians were crushingly defeated by the Old Swiss Confederacy during the Burgundian Wars meaning that Hellikon was restored to Austrian (Habsburg) authority by 1477. Following the country reforms of the Austrian King Maximilian I., Hellikon fell under the authority of "Further Austria" in 1491. The Möhlinbach territory (including Hellikon) came under the administration of the Kameralherrschaft Rheinfelden.

During the 17th century, there was very little time when peace prevailed. During the Rappenkrieg, a peasant uprising that lasted from 1612 until 1614, and the Thirty Years' War (1633–38) the village's economic development went into decline. Also during the Pfälzer-Erbfolge Wars (1688–97) foreign troops passed through the region.

As a result of the Treaty of Campo Formio in 1797, the Fricktal became a French protectorate, forming the front line between the French Revolutionary and the Austrian troops in the War of the Second Coalition. On 20 February 1802, Rheinfelden was made a district capital of the newly created Canton of Fricktal, (Principality of Frickgau), joining the Helvetic Republic in August. On 19 February 1803, Canton Fricktal, including Zuzgen, was absorbed into Canton Aargau.

On 2 July 1801, a large fire destroyed almost all the houses in the village. Additionally epidemics and crop failures followed, forcing many inhabitants away. Other than farming there were few employment opportunities (for instance a small thread mill). For decades the population remained stable or slightly dropped. At the beginning of the 1980s strong building activity started, and ever more people moved from Basel and its suburbs into the village. The population has since grown by over 50%.

== Notable sights ==
At the upper entry to the village two churches stand opposite one another, the Christ Catholic St. Georg in Barock style and the Roman Catholic St. Georg in Neogothic style.

== Flag ==
The blazon of the municipal coat of arms is Azure five Pine Trees Vert issuant from three Mounts of the same the middle one being lower and in chief a Mullet Or or "Over blue, three green hills with five green trees under a yellow six pointed start". The flag with five trees was officially adopted in 1872, although no colours were documented. The green-blue combination was introduced in 1945. The heraldry is an inappropriate choice because the colours neutralise each other and the flag cannot be seen when flown form a distance. A proposed revision to add a gold shield and red start was rejected in 2002.

== Demographics ==
Zuzgen has a population (as of December 2020) of 881. As of June 2009, 9.5% of the population are foreign nationals. Over the last 10 years (1997–2007) the population has changed at a rate of 10.5%. Most of the population (as of 2000) speaks German (97.8%), with Albanian being second most common (1.1%) and Italian being third (0.4%).

The age distribution, as of 2008, in Zuzgen is; 109 children or 12.9% of the population are between 0 and 9 years old and 104 teenagers or 12.3% are between 10 and 19. Of the adult population, 65 people or 7.7% of the population are between 20 and 29 years old. 102 people or 12.0% are between 30 and 39, 171 people or 20.2% are between 40 and 49, and 137 people or 16.2% are between 50 and 59. The senior population distribution is 85 people or 10.0% of the population are between 60 and 69 years old, 45 people or 5.3% are between 70 and 79, there are 26 people or 3.1% who are between 80 and 89, and there are 4 people or 0.5% who are 90 and older.

As of 2000, there were 18 homes with 1 or 2 persons in the household, 115 homes with 3 or 4 persons in the household, and 136 homes with 5 or more persons in the household. As of 2000, there were 272 private households (homes and apartments) in the municipality, and an average of 2.7 persons per household. In 2008 there were 195 single family homes (or 56.4% of the total) out of a total of 346 homes and apartments. There were a total of 1 empty apartments for a 0.3% vacancy rate. As of 2007, the construction rate of new housing units was 2.5 new units per 1000 residents.

In the 2007 federal election the most popular party was the SVP which received 35.96% of the vote. The next three most popular parties were the SP (16.38%), the CVP (14.74%) and the Green Party (13.17%). In the federal election, a total of 244 votes were cast, and the voter turnout was 42.1%.

The historical population is given in the following table:

Historical population
| Year | Pop. | ±% |
|---|---|---|
| 1900 | 606 | — |
| 1930 | 575 | −5.1% |
| 1950 | 587 | +2.1% |
| 1960 | 624 | +6.3% |
| 1975 | 620 | −0.6% |
| 1980 | 576 | −7.1% |
| 1990 | 651 | +13.0% |
| 2000 | 736 | +13.1% |

== Economy ==
As of 2007, Zuzgen had an unemployment rate of 1.57%. As of 2005, there were 98 people employed in the primary economic sector and about 30 businesses involved in this sector. 27 people are employed in the secondary sector and there are 6 businesses in this sector. 74 people are employed in the tertiary sector, with 21 businesses in this sector.

In 2000 there were 364 workers who lived in the municipality. Of these, 259 or about 71.2% of the residents worked outside Zuzgen while 32 people commuted into the municipality for work. There were a total of 137 jobs (of at least 6 hours per week) in the municipality. Of the working population, 17.2% used public transportation to get to work, and 53.6% used a private car. Most of working population of Zuzgen are commuters, working in the larger Fricktal municipalities and the Basel agglomeration.

== Transport links ==
Hellikon lies on the unclassified road running along the Möhlintal from Möhlin to Wegenstetten. A small side road leads to Buus. The nearest intersection with the A3 motorway can be found at Rheinfelden. Connection with the public transport network is through the Postauto bus route in either the direction of Möhlin or Weggenstetten.

== Religion ==
From the 2000 census, 395 or 54.2% were Roman Catholic, while 198 or 27.2% belonged to the Swiss Reformed Church. Of the rest of the population, there were 50 individuals (or about 6.86% of the population) who belonged to the Christian Catholic faith and 1.2% of the population was Muslim while 0.5% followed other beliefs.

== Education ==
In Zuzgen about 78.9% of the population (between age 25–64) have completed either non-mandatory upper secondary education or additional higher education (either university or a Fachhochschule). Of the school age population (in the 2008/2009 school year), there are 87 students attending primary school in the municipality.

The municipality has one kindergarten and one primary school. Middle and secondary schools are located in Möhlin and shared by the entire Möhlintal. Alternative secondary schools are available in Wegenstetten and Zeiningen for those who do not wish to proceed into further education. Thanks to an inter-cantonal agreement, youngsters from the Fricktal may attend the college in Muttenz (canton Baselland).
