= Hellikon =

- Municipality
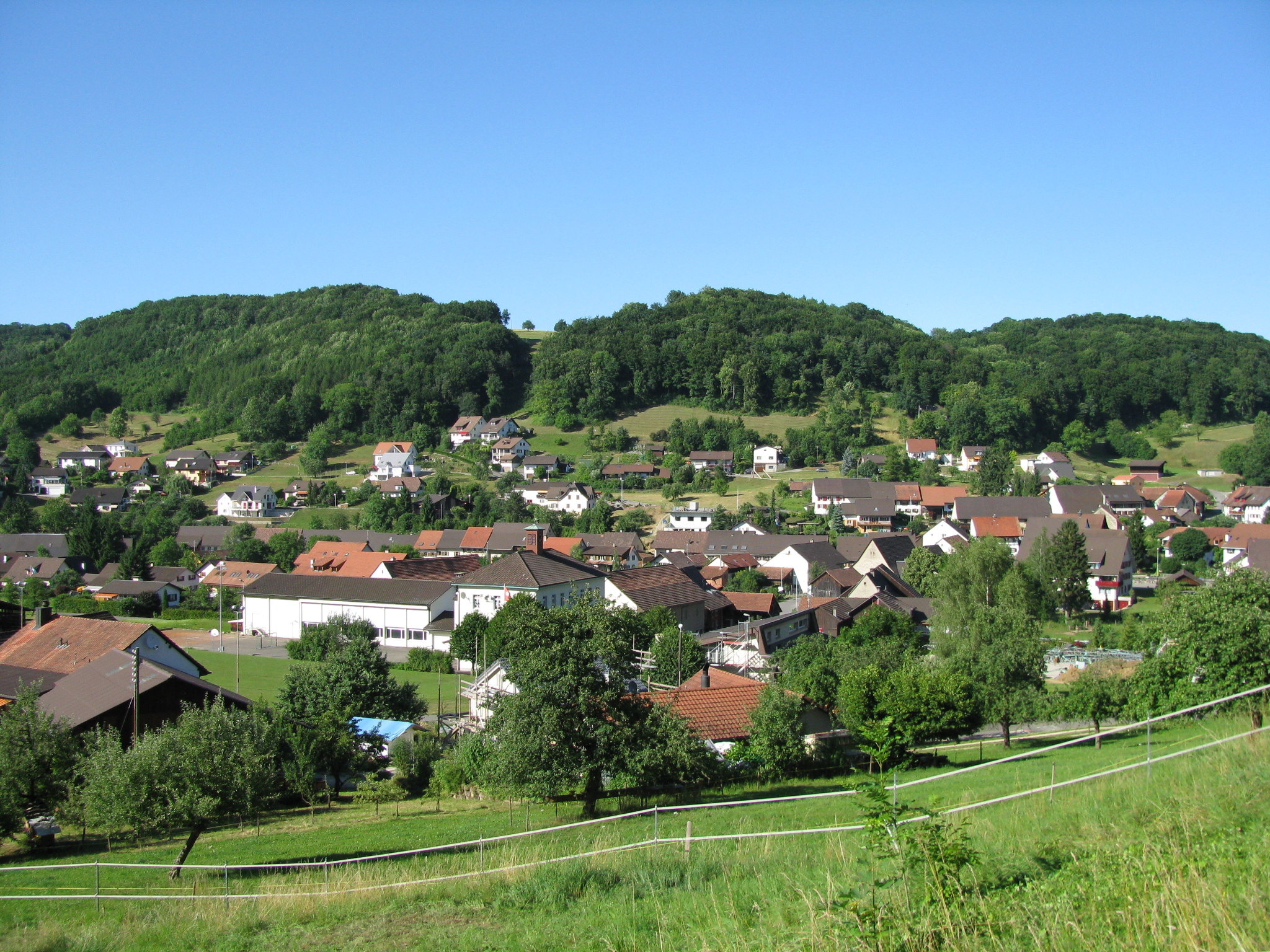

- Flag Coat of arms
- Location of Hellikon
- Location within Switzerland Location within Canton of Aargau
- Coordinates: 47°31′N 7°56′E
- Country: Switzerland
- Canton: Aargau
- District: Rheinfelden

Area
  - Total: 7.04 km^{2} (2.72 sq mi)
- Elevation: 423 m (1,388 ft)

Population (December 2007)
  - Total: 782
  - Density: 111/km^{2} (288/sq mi)
- Time zone: UTC+01:00 (CET)
  - Summer (DST): UTC+02:00 (CEST)
- Postal code: 4316
- SFOS number: 4251
- ISO 3166 code: CH-AG
- Localities: Unterdorf, Oberdorf
- Surrounded by: Hemiken (BL), Buus (BL), Zuzgen, Obermumpf, Schupfahrt, Weggenstetten
- Twin towns: N/A
- Website: www.hellikon.ch

Hellikon (Alemannic German pronunciation: [ˈhɛlːikχə]) is a municipality in the Rheinfelden district of canton Aargau in Switzerland. It is located in the West of the Fricktal region, around four kilometers Southwest of the border with Germany and has a border with Canton Basel-Landschaft.

Aerial view (1950)

== Geography ==
The Hellikon village lies in the upper reaches of the Möhlin valley (Möhlintal) through which flows the Möhlinbach in a Northwesterly direction towards the Rhine. There are two parts to the village: The lower village (Unterdorf) lies parallel to the Möhlinbach for over one kilometer; The upper village (Oberdorf) lies on the West side of the valley. The flat valley floor alongside the Möhlinbach is, on average, close to 200 meters wide but widens to almost 400 meters when joined by feeder streams. The village is bordered on both sides by the hills of the Tabel Jura (Tafeljura) which have very steep lower slopes leading to flat upper plateau's that are intensively farmed.

To the east of the village rises the Wabrig plateau which is over one kilometer wide and stretches for more than four kilometers between the Lohnberg plateau (above Zuzgen) and the Hersberg (above Wegenstetten). A deeply cut side valley runs in a Westerly direction from the village, separating the Northern Neulig plateau from the Southern Egg plateau.

Hellikon has an area, as of 2009, of 7.05 square kilometers (2.72 sq mi). Of this area, 4.29 km^{2} (1.66 sq mi) or 60.9% is used for agricultural purposes, while 2.3 km^{2} (0.89 sq mi) or 32.6% is forested. Of the rest of the land, 0.46 km^{2} (0.18 sq mi) or 6.5% is settled (buildings or roads).

Of the built up area, housing and buildings made up 3.7% and transportation infrastructure made up 2.1%. Out of the forested land, 30.9% of the total land area is heavily forested and 1.7% is covered with orchards or small clusters of trees. Of the agricultural land, 37.0% is used for growing crops and 21.3% is pastures, while 2.6% is used for orchards or vine crops.

The highest point is found on the west side of the Neulig plateau (633 m (2,077 ft)) and the lowest at the Möhlinbach (397 m (1,302 ft)).

Neighbouring villages in Kanton Aargau are Zuzgen to the Northwest, Obermumpf to the Northeast, Schupfart to the East and Wegenstetten to the Southeast. Neighbouring villages in Canton Baselland are Buus to the West and Hemmiken to the Southwest.

== History ==
The first documented mention of Hellickonn dates from 1209. The low jurisdiction was in the possession of the Hofes Zeiningen, which in turn were affiliated to the Stift Säckingen. The gentry and tenants of the "upper jurisdiction" were Habsburgers. After the Waldshut war of 1468 the whole Fricktal was pledged to the Duchy of Burgundy. The Burgundians were crushingly defeated by the Old Swiss Confederacy during the Burgundian Wars meaning that Hellikon was restored to Austrian (Habsburg) authority by 1477. Following the country reforms of the Austrian King Maximilian I. Hellikon fell under the authority of "Further Austria" in 1491. The Möhlinbach territory (including Hellikon) came under the administration of the Kameralherrschaft Rheinfelden.

During the 17th century, there was very little time when peace prevailed. During the Rappenkrieg, a peasant uprising that lasted from 1612 until 1614 and the Thirty Years' War (1633 to 1638) the villages economic development went into decline. Also during the Pfälzer-Erbfolge Wars (1688 to 1697) foreign troops passed through the region.

As a result of the Treaty of Campo Formio in 1797, the Fricktal became a French protectorate, forming the front line between the French Revolutionary and the Austrian troops in the War of the Second Coalition. On 20 February 1802 Rheinfelden was made a district capital of the newly created Canton of Fricktal, (Principality of Frickgau), joining the Helvetic Republic in August. On 19 February 1803 Canton Fricktal, including Hellikon, was absorbed into Canton Aargau.

At the 1875 Christmas Fair a tragic accident occurred. The stairwell of the ten-year-old school house collapsed, killing 73 people of whom most were children. Between 1850 and 1950 the village population dropped by over twenty percent. Up to the 20th century cereals and grapes contributed the main income, however the phylloxera plague and mildew epidemics effectively ended grape farming in the village. Hellikon transformed from a farming to a commuter community with ever more people moving from the Basel region. Since the beginning of the 1980s the population has grown by almost one third.

In August 2009, Hellikon celebrated its 800th anniversary with a large village fair.

== Flag ==
The blazon of the municipal flags describes "Over blue, a green triple hill and three yellow morels". The flag was officially adopted in 1924 but it was known much earlier, although never documented. The current form of the flag dates from 1966.

== Demographics ==
Hellikon has a population (as of December 2020) of 780. As of June 2009, 5.2% of the population are foreign nationals. Over the last 10 years (1997–2007) the population has changed at a rate of 1%. Most of the population (as of 2000) speaks German (95.6%), with Albanian being second most common ( 2.4%) and Serbo-Croatian being third ( 0.5%).

The age distribution, as of 2008, in Hellikon is; 62 children or 8.1% of the population are between 0 and 9 years old and 85 teenagers or 11.1% are between 10 and 19. Of the adult population, 100 people or 13.1% of the population are between 20 and 29 years old. 85 people or 11.1% are between 30 and 39, 134 people or 17.5% are between 40 and 49, and 131 people or 17.1% are between 50 and 59. The senior population distribution is 69 people or 9.0% of the population are between 60 and 69 years old, 54 people or 7.0% are between 70 and 79, there are 41 people or 5.4% who are between 80 and 89, and there are 5 people or 0.7% who are 90 and older.

As of 2000, there were 10 homes with 1 or 2 persons in the household, 108 homes with 3 or 4 persons in the household, and 132 homes with 5 or more persons in the household. As of 2000, there were 253 private households (homes and apartments) in the municipality, and an average of 2.9 persons per household. In 2008 there were 177 single family homes (or 57.7% of the total) out of a total of 307 homes and apartments. There were a total of 2 empty apartments for a 0.7% vacancy rate. As of 2007, the construction rate of new housing units was 6.5 new units per 1000 residents.

In the 2007 federal election the most popular party was the SVP which received 51.3% of the vote. The next three most popular parties were the CVP (20.8%), the Green Party (9.6%) and the SP (7.6%).

The historical population is given in the following table:

Historical population
Year	Pop.	±%
1768	252	—
1850	681	+170.2%
1870	705	+3.5%
1900	581	−17.6%
1950	539	−7.2%
2000	747	+38.6%

== Religion ==
From the 2000 census, 389 or 52.1% were Roman Catholic, while 110 or 14.7% belonged to the Swiss Reformed Church. Of the rest of the population, there were 148 individuals (or about 19.81% of the population) who belonged to the Christian Catholic faith. This gives Hellikon the highest proportion of Christ Catholics in Switzerland.

== Economy ==
As of 2007, Hellikon had an unemployment rate of 1.65%. As of 2005, there were 88 people employed in the primary economic sector and about 30 businesses involved in this sector. 47 people are employed in the secondary sector and there are 15 businesses in this sector. 28 people are employed in the tertiary sector, with 11 businesses in this sector.

In 2000 there were 365 workers who lived in the municipality. Of these, 270 or about 74.0% of the residents worked outside Hellikon while 40 people commuted into the municipality for work. There were a total of 135 jobs (of at least 6 hours per week) in the municipality. Of the working population, 14.5% used public transportation to get to work, and 48.8% used a private car.

Small businesses are active in plastic work and building. Most of working population of Hellikon are commuters, working in the larger Fricktal municipalities and the Basel agglomeration.

== Transport links ==
Hellikon lies on the unclassified road running along the Möhlintal from Möhlin to Wegenstetten. A small side road leads to Buus. The nearest intersections with the A3 motorway can be found at Rheinfelden and Eiken. Connection with the public transport network is through the Postauto bus route in either the direction of Möhlin or Weggenstetten.

== Sights ==
The entire village of Hellikon is designated as part of the Inventory of Swiss Heritage Sites.

== Education ==
The entire Swiss population is generally well educated. In Hellikon about 65.1% of the population (between age 25-64) have completed either non-mandatory upper secondary education or additional higher education (either university or a Fachhochschule). Of the school age population (in the 2008/2009 school year), there are 59 students attending primary school in the municipality.

The municipality has one Kindergarten and one Primary School. Middle and Secondary schools are located in Möhlin and shared by the entire Möhlintal. Alternative secondary schools are available in Wegenstetten and Zeiningen for those who do not wish to proceed into further education. Thanks to an inter-cantonal agreement, youngsters from the Fricktal may attend the college in Muttenz (canton Baselland).
