= Fischingertal =

Valley in Switzerland

Coordinates: 47°31′53″N 7°56′35″E

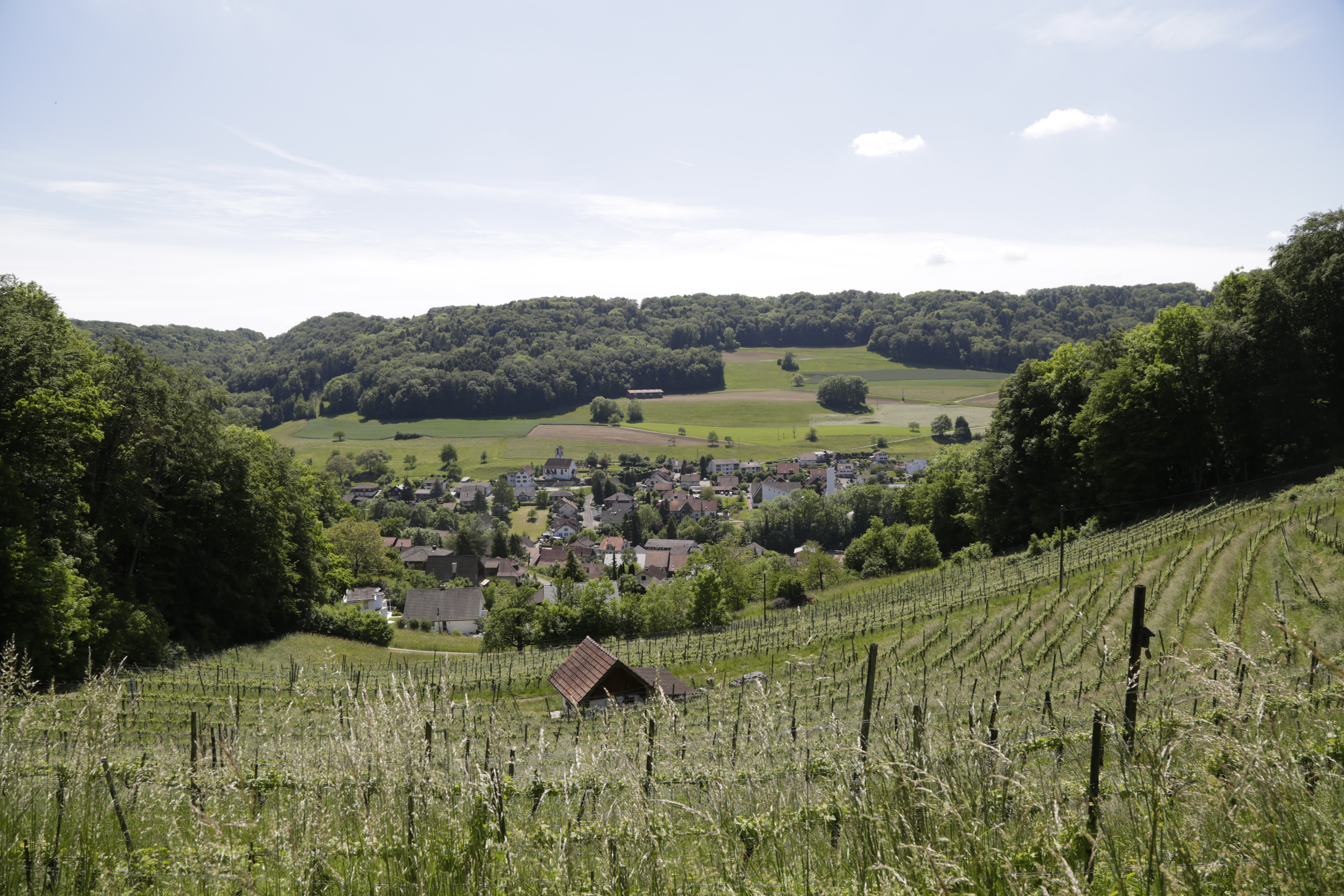
View of Obermumpf from the vineyard below Trumleste

The Fischingertal is a 5 kilometer long valley running between Mumpf and Schupfart in the Rheinfelden District of Canton Aargau, Switzerland. Other municipalities near the valley are Wallbach, Zeiningen, Zuzgen, Obermumpf, and Stein. There is a school, Fischingertal Primary School in the valley. Mumpfer Fluf in Obermumpf has a cantonal hiking network and the mixed deciduous and coniferous forest has enough fire-place and seating areas to attract tourists.

The historic Church of St. Peter and Paul of 14th century in Obermumpf, which was excavated in 1957 is another tourist attraction. The highest municipality in the Fischinger Valley is Schupfart, which is situated at the foot of the Thiersteinberg mountain. A postal bus line, A3 Eiken exit, or the local roads to Obermumpf, Wegenstetten, and Eiken lead to the farming community of black forest. It is also connected by PostAuto Northern Switzerland's bus line 90 (Möhlin–Wallbach–Mumpf–Schupfart). There is a youth meeting place in Wallbach.

== History ==
The valley and the Talbach were named in memory of the Mumpf citizen Johann Baptist Ignaz Fischinger (1768–1844), who served as the first district administrator in the then newly formed district of Rheinfelden.

== Geography ==
The valley lies in the northeastern Tabular Jura which unlike many other parts of the Swiss Jura has not been folded. The valley runs straight from southeast to northwest and is surrounded by broad, tabular plateaus into which the steep-walled, narrow valley is carved. It is traversed by the Fischingerbach stream, which rises on the northern flank of the Tiersteinberg near Schupfart at approximately 550 m above sea level and flows into the High Rhine near Mumpf at 286 m above sea level. Above Schupfart is the Fricktal-Schupfart airfield, where the annual Schupfart Festival takes place.

== Climate ==
The valley experiences up to 40 more sunny days than the Swiss Plateau and is also mostly fog-free. The relatively mild climate and the sheltered location of the Fischingertal, the valley is also ideal for viticulture. On the south side of the Eikerberg near Obermumpf, the Spätburgunder grape variety is cultivated for the red wine Obermumpfer Pinot Noir, and the Müller-Thurgau grape variety is cultivated for the white wine Obermumpfer Riesling x Sylvaner.

== Animal species ==
Some of the endangered and protected species of the region are:

- Sand lizard (Lacerta agilis)
- Western Fritillary (Melitaea parthenoides)
- Marbled White (Melanargia galathea)
- Field cricket (Gryllus campestris)
- Common sickle grasshopper (Phaneroptera falcata)
