= Rappenkrieg =

1612–1614 conflict in Austria

The Rappenkrieg was a conflict that lasted from July 1612 until September 1614 in the Further Austrian district of Breisgau. It involved the Austrian rulers putting down a peasant uprising. The uprising occurred in what is now the Swiss Canton of Aargau and in the southern portion of what is now the German State of Baden-Württemberg. It is not to be confused with the Rappenkrieg in Basel-Stadt, Switzerland (1591–1594), although it had similar causes.

== History ==
The trigger for the dispute was the increase in sales tax on wine by one rappen per mass. In March 1612, peasant representatives from the Fricktal, the Hotzenwald, the Wehratal and from the Dinkelberg held a meeting in the Fricktal municipality of Mumpf. The result of the meeting was a letter of complaint to the Austrian authorities in Ensisheim (now Alsace). The peasants complained not only about what they saw as an unjustified tax increase, but also about increasing compulsory labor, economic problems due to bad harvests and the inaction of the authorities against "witches and fiends".

But the government ignored the complaints and demanded that the farmers submit. In July 1612, negotiations between government representatives and around 800 armed farmers took place near Mumpf, but they were unsuccessful. As a result, open rebellion broke out.

The forest towns refused to ally themselves with the peasants of the surrounding villages. The farmers hindered trade in Waldshut and Säckingen and dug the drinking water from Laufenburg. However, the necessary material for the siege of Rheinfelden was lacking, which is why the devastation of its surroundings was limited. The insurgents used violence against the Olsberg monastery and fired on Beuggen castle.

When the Austrian government sent troops to put down the uprising, the rebellious peasants turned to the Swiss Confederation for mediation. In September 1614, delegates from all Swiss towns went to Rheinfelden to mediate between the parties on a peaceful settlement of the conflict. After eight days, the government was able to push through the tax increase, but had to refrain from cracking down on the farmers. Their leaders got away with light sentences.

== See also ==
- Battles of the Old Swiss Confederacy

== Bibliography ==
- Joseph Bader: Martin Haizmann. Ein Bild aus dem neuen Bauernkriege. in: Badenia, oder, Das badische Land und Volk, Band II. 1862, p. 1–15
- Peter Steuer: Der vorderösterreichische Rappenkrieg (1612–1614), in: Zeitschrift für die Geschichte des Oberrheins 128. NF 89. 1980, p. 119–165.
