= Saldome =

Wooden domes in Switzerland

Coordinates: 47.56755°N 7.83073°E

Saldome 1 and 2 are two very large wooden cupola buildings near Möhlin, Switzerland. They both serve to store the Swiss stockpile of road de-icing salt. At the time of construction, Saldome 2 was the largest wooden dome of Europe.

Due to the aggressive salty environment, neither a concrete or steel construction was deemed possible. The wood construction engineering firm Häring & Co in nearby Pratteln planned and built the two storage halls.

== Saldome 1 ==
The first cupola was built from 1500 m³ (53'000 cubic ft) of silver fir and European spruce. Construction began in April 2004, and was operational in August 2005. It has a diameter of 93 m and a height of 31 m. Saldome 1 can store 80'000 metric tons of salt.

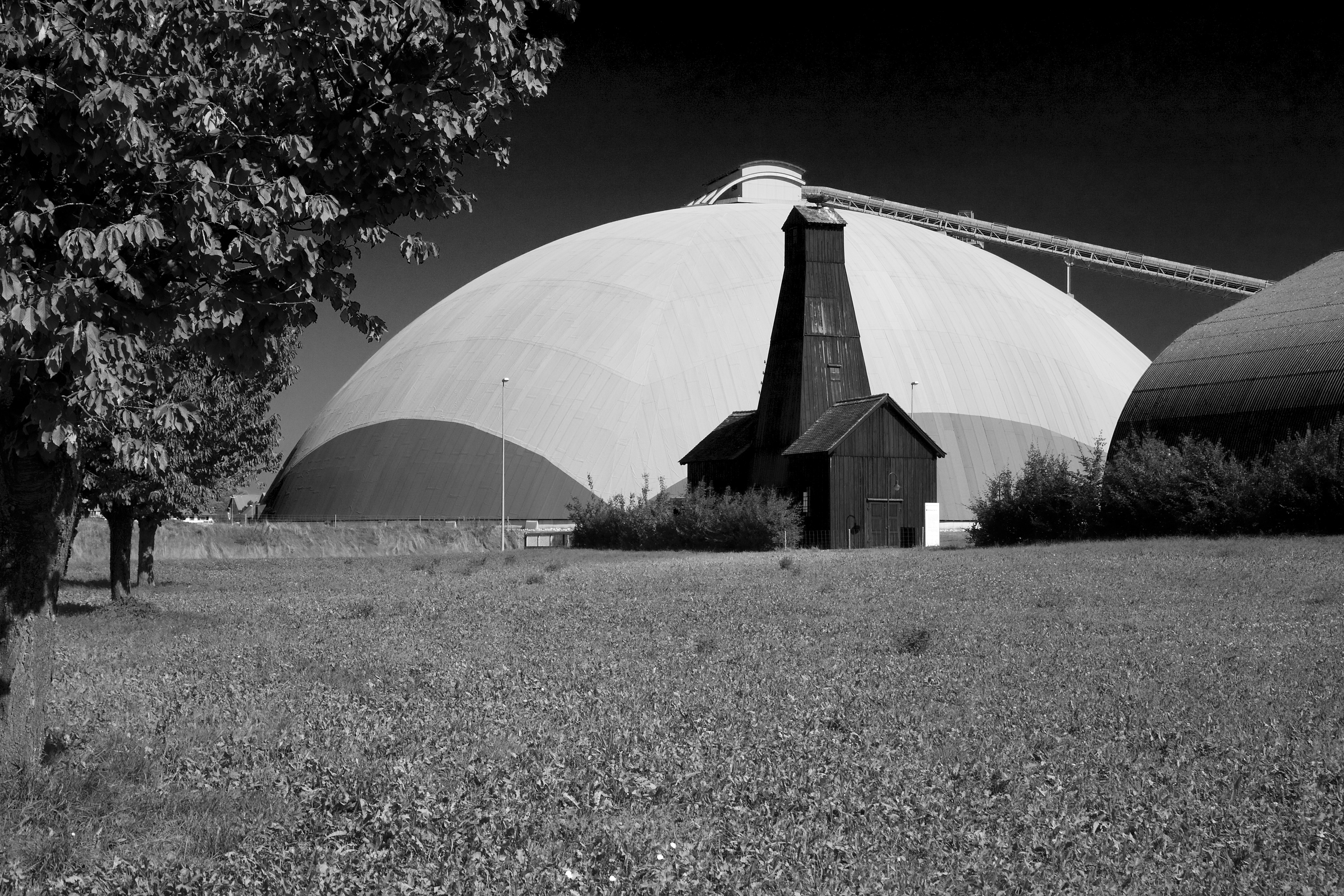
Saldome 1 with a historic salt well drilling tower in the foreground

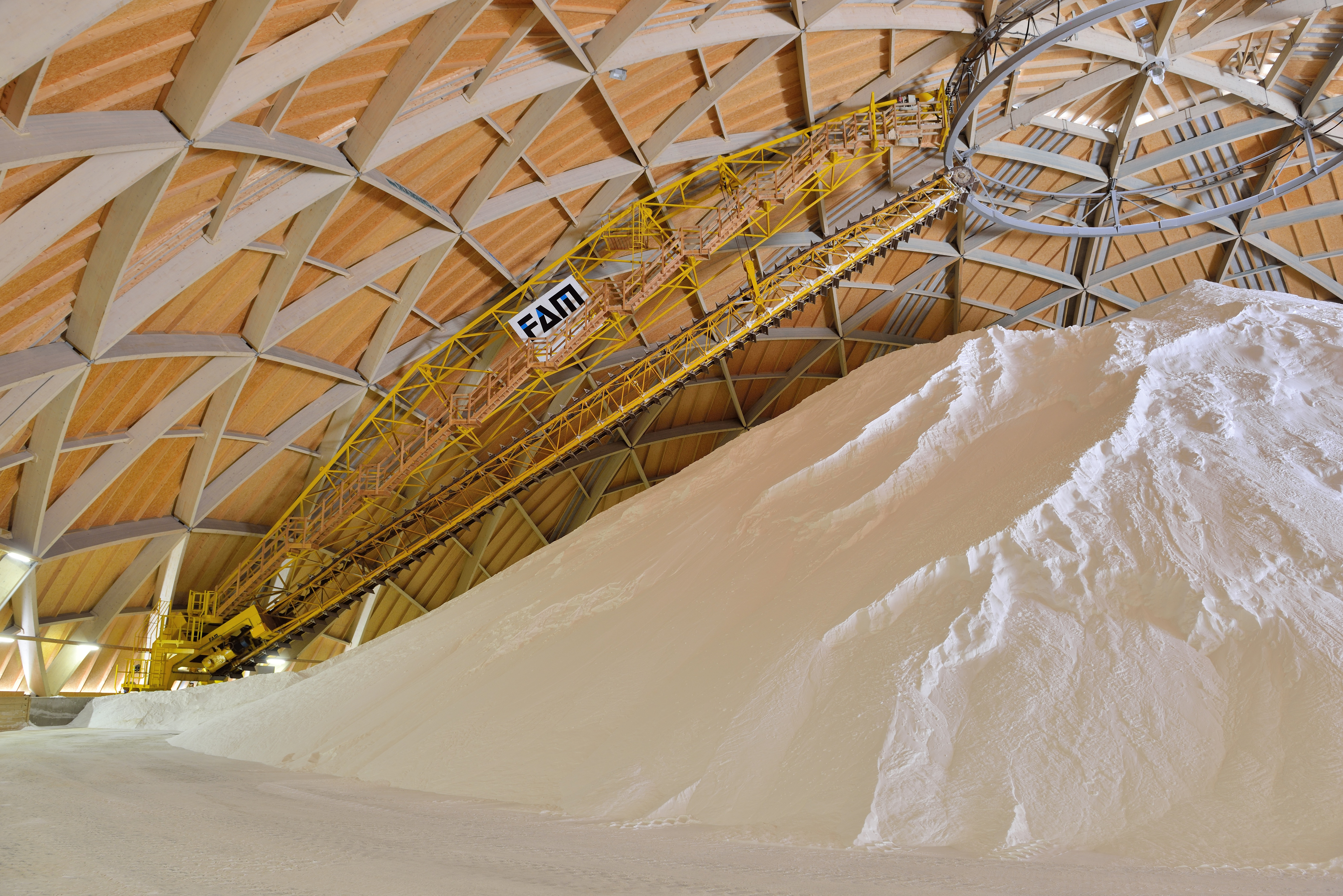
Interior view

== Saldome 2 ==
The latter extension was constructed from June 2011 until May 2012, and needed only 1300 m³ of wood. It can store in excess of 100'000 tons of salt, and has nearly the same height of 32.5 meters, but a diameter of 120 m.

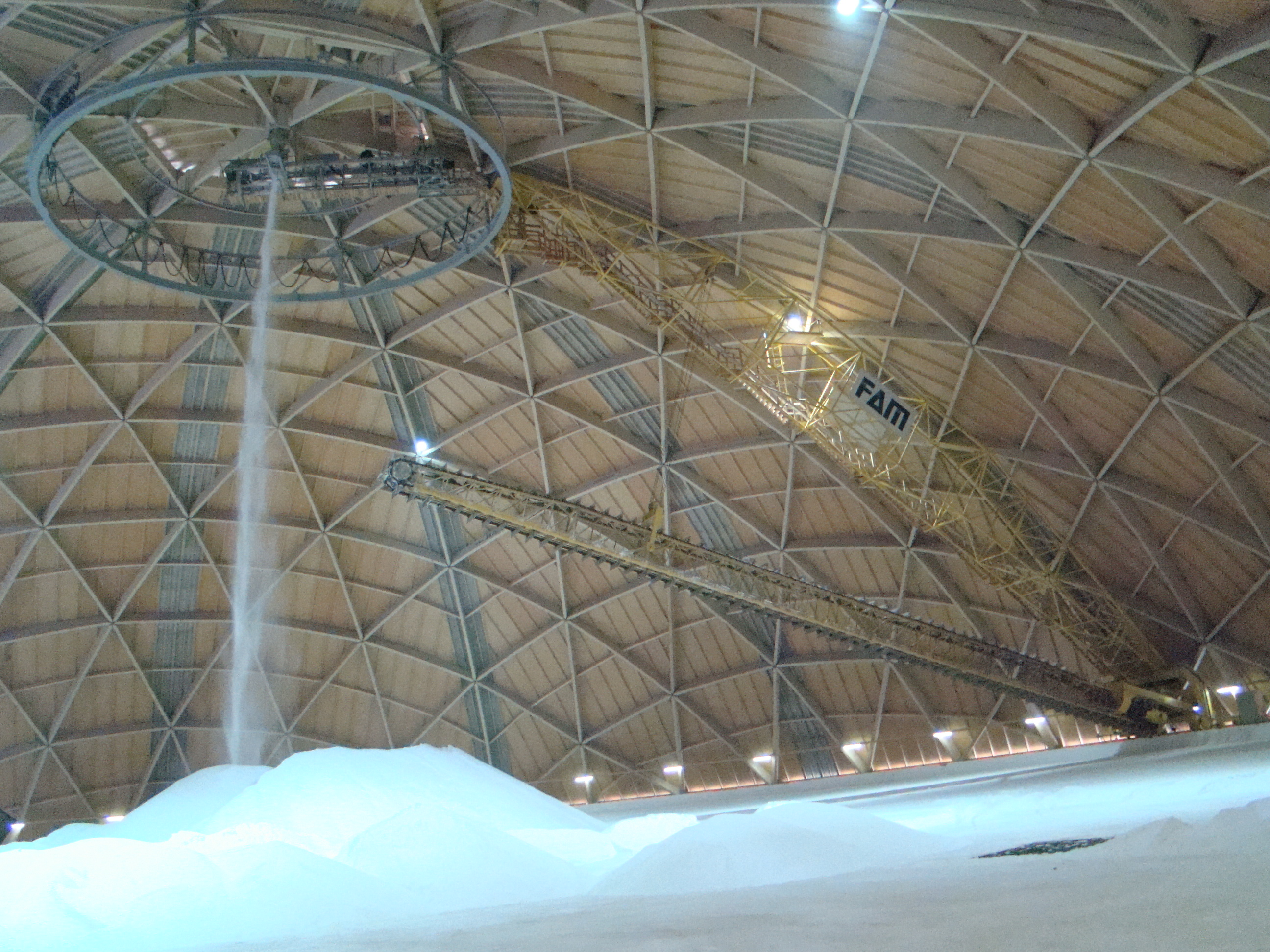
Saldome 2, interior view
