= Möhlinbach =

River in Switzerland

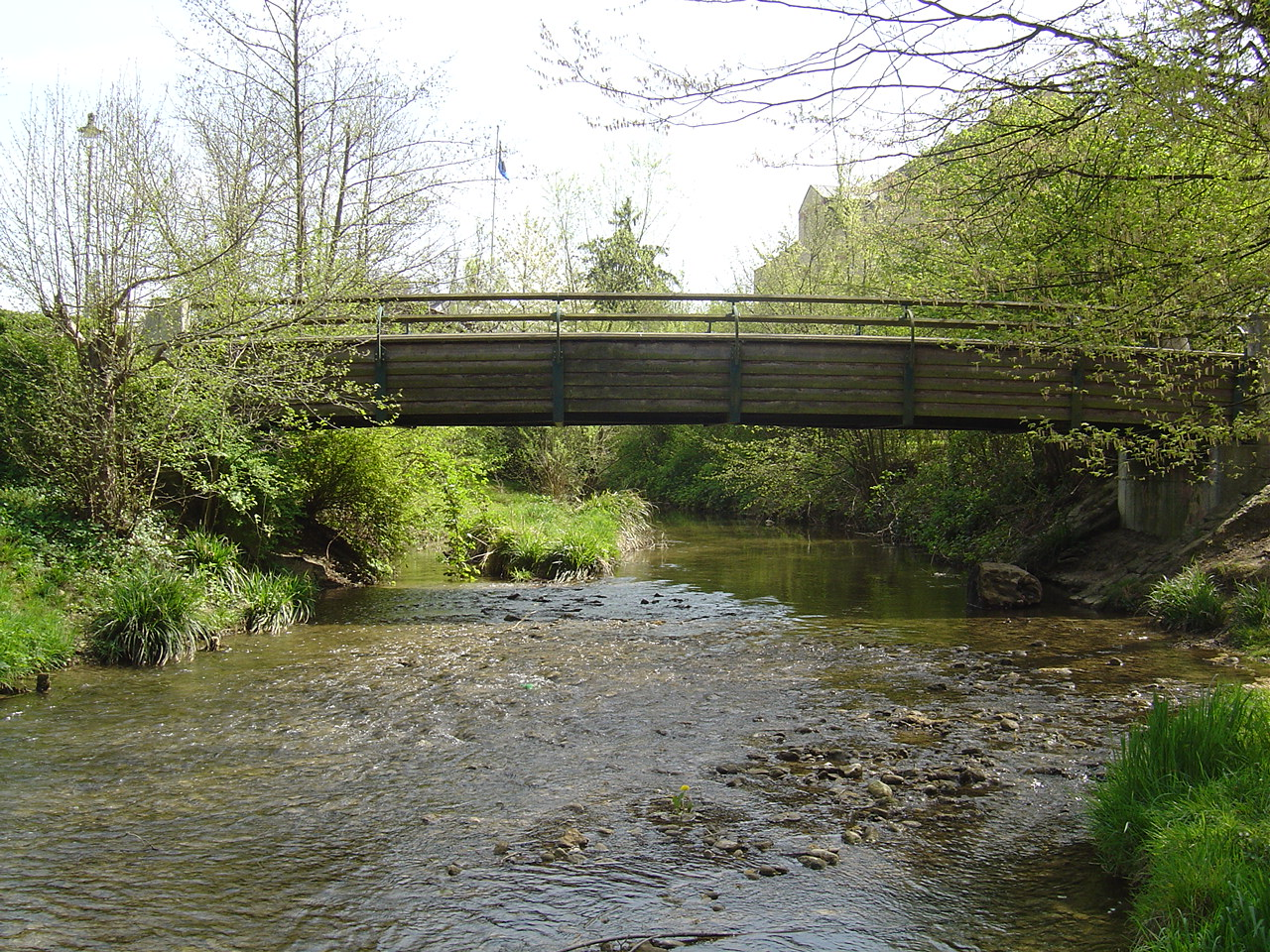
- Pedestrian bridge over the Möhlinbach

Location
- Country: Switzerland
- Cantons: Aargau

Physical characteristics
- Source
  - location: Near Hemmiken
  - coordinates: 47.486004°N 7.904356°E
- Mouth
  - location: High Rhine (Hochrhein)
  - coordinates: 47.580426°N 7.83783°E
- Length: 15 km
- Basin size: 37.3 km

Basin features
- Progression: Rhine→ North Sea

The Möhlinbach (lit. 'Möhlin Creek') is a 15 km (9.3 mi) long river in the Rheinfelden District of the canton of Aargau, Switzerland. It is a left tributary of the High Rhine. Its mouth is located north of Möhlin.

== See also ==
- List of rivers of Switzerland
- Rhine
