= Mumpf =

- Municipality
- Flag Coat of arms
- Location of Mumpf
- Location within Switzerland Location within Canton of Aargau
- Coordinates: 47°33′N 7°55′E
- Country: Switzerland
- Canton: Aargau
- District: Rheinfelden

Area
  - Total: 3.13 km^{2} (1.21 sq mi)
- Elevation: 287 m (942 ft)

Population (December 2005)
  - Total: 1,267
  - Density: 405/km^{2} (1,050/sq mi)
- Time zone: UTC+01:00 (CET)
  - Summer (DST): UTC+02:00 (CEST)
- Postal code: 4322
- SFOS number: 4255
- ISO 3166 code: CH-AG
- Surrounded by: Bad Säckingen (DE-BW), Obermumpf, Stein, Wallbach, Zeiningen, Zuzgen
- Website: www.mumpf.ch

Mumpf is a municipality in the district of Rheinfelden in the canton of Aargau in Switzerland.

== History ==
Aerial view (1949)

The area around Mumpf was prehistorically settled. In 1991 a mid to late neolithic fortified settlement was excavated on the Kapf/Chapf hill. This settlement was surrounded by a huge moat, and presumably protected by palisades. Inside the settlement wooden beams, fire pits, a clay pit and numerous stone tools were found. In addition, many individual Stone and Bronze Age objects have been found throughout the municipality. An Iron Age midden heap was found at Rifeld. Below the Gasthaus (combination hotel and restaurant) Anker are the foundations of a Roman small fort from the second half of the 4th Century and a nearby soldier's grave from the same period. Between Mumpf and Stein, a fragment of a milestone, with an inscription, from the time of Antoninus Pius (139 AD) was discovered.

Mumpf is first mentioned in 1218 as Mumpher. In 1278 it was mentioned as Nider-Mumpfe. It was known as Nieder-Mumpf until 1803. It was first mentioned as being part of the lands ruled by the Counts of Homburg. It later came to be under the Habsburg urbarium (a collection of regulations, which related nobleman and peasants and their mutual obligations) and their high court as part of the Säckingen district. Under the Habsburgs, Wallbach and Mumpf formed at vogtei in the landschaft Möhlinbach under the Herrschaft of Rheinfelden. The low court rights were originally held by manor house Stein which was owned by Säckingen Abbey. In 1463 these rights went to the Austrian-appointed vogt. The village laws were first handed down in 1535. Then, in 1612 a general assembly of the Rhine region adopted a notice of appeal on the ever-increasing taxes and increasing impoverishment. This document led to the Rappenkrieg, a peasant uprising that lasted from 1612 until 1614. During the Thirty Years War Mumpf was looted several times. Following the Act of Mediation in 1803, the entire Fricktal, including Mumpf, joined the new Canton of Aargau.

St. Martin's church in Mumpf is first mentioned in 1441. It was renovated and expanded in 1541 and in 1741 the choir was rebuilt. The most recent renovation and reconstruction took place in 1957. The rights to collect church taxes were held by Säckingen Abbey until 1802 or 1803. The Mumpf parish included Wallbach until 1938.

Until the 19th Century fishing, timber rafting and grain production were the main sources of income in the village. Therefore, Mumpf and Wallbach were major members of the Rhine association. Although the Rhine ferry (which has operated since the Middle Ages) is still in operation, most traffic now uses either the old bridge, the railway bridge which opened in 1875 or the A3 motorway bridge from the 1970s.

A large proportion of the population works in the Fricktaler chemical company and in the agglomeration of Basel.

== Geography ==
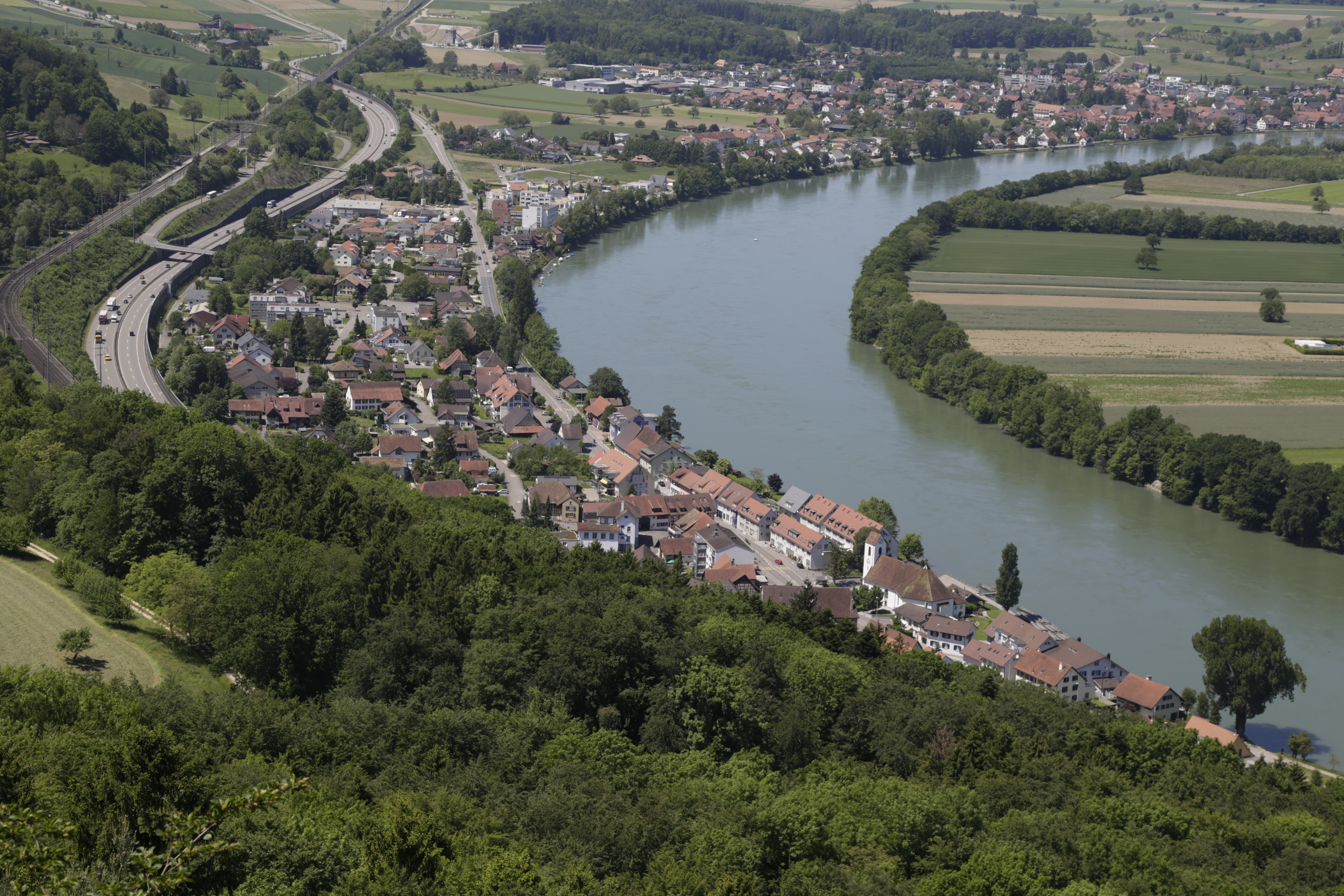

Mumpf has an area, as of 2009, of 3.1 square kilometers (1.2 sq mi). Of this area, 0.84 km^{2} (0.32 sq mi) or 27.1% is used for agricultural purposes, while 1.33 km^{2} (0.51 sq mi) or 42.9% is forested. Of the rest of the land, 0.69 km^{2} (0.27 sq mi) or 22.3% is settled (buildings or roads), 0.26 km^{2} (0.10 sq mi) or 8.4% is either rivers or lakes.

Of the built up area, housing and buildings made up 7.4% and transportation infrastructure made up 13.5%. Out of the forested land, 41.3% of the total land area is heavily forested and 1.6% is covered with orchards or small clusters of trees. Of the agricultural land, 11.3% is used for growing crops and 14.2% is pastures, while 1.6% is used for orchards or vine crops. All the water in the municipality is in rivers and streams.

The municipality is located in the Rheinfelden district, between the Rhine river and the edge of the Jura Mountains. It consists of the linear village of Mumpf and the hamlet of Oberberg and the manor house at Schönegg.

== Coat of arms ==
The blazon of the municipal coat of arms is Vert a Bend wavy Argent between a Spearhead and an Oar both Or.

== Demographics ==
Mumpf has a population (as of December 2020) of 1,543. As of June 2009, 32.0% of the population are foreign nationals. Over the last 10 years (1997–2007) the population has changed at a rate of 30.2%. Most of the population (as of 2000) speaks German (87.3%), with Albanian being second most common (4.5%) and Serbo-Croatian being third (2.9%).

The age distribution, as of 2008, in Mumpf is: 154 children or 11.8% of the population are between 0 and 9 years old and 140 teenagers or 10.7% are between 10 and 19. Of the adult population, 168 people or 12.8% of the population are between 20 and 29 years old. 203 people or 15.5% are between 30 and 39, 251 people or 19.2% are between 40 and 49, and 171 people or 13.1% are between 50 and 59. The senior population distribution is 120 people or 9.2% of the population are between 60 and 69 years old, 75 people or 5.7% are between 70 and 79, there are 25 people or 1.9% who are between 80 and 89, and there is 1 person who is 90 or older.

As of 2000 the average number of residents per living room was 0.59 which is about equal to the cantonal average of 0.57 per room. In this case, a room is defined as space of a housing unit of at least 4 m^{2} (43 sq ft) as normal bedrooms, dining rooms, living rooms, kitchens and habitable cellars and attics. About 58.1% of the total households were owner occupied, or in other words did not pay rent (though they may have a mortgage or a rent-to-own agreement).

As of 2000, there were 31 homes with 1 or 2 persons in the household, 236 homes with 3 or 4 persons in the household, and 151 homes with 5 or more persons in the household. As of 2000, there were 429 private households (homes and apartments) in the municipality, and an average of 2.5 persons per household. In 2008 there were 232 single family homes (or 41.9% of the total) out of a total of 554 homes and apartments. There were a total of 6 empty apartments for a 1.1% vacancy rate. As of 2007, the construction rate of new housing units was 4.8 new units per 1000 residents.

In the 2007 federal election the most popular party was the SVP which received 35.21% of the vote. The next three most popular parties were the SP (17.4%), the CVP (15.92%) and the FDP (15.66%). In the federal election, a total of 243 votes were cast, and the voter turnout was 32.5%.

The historical population is given in the following table:

Historical population
Year	Pop.	±%
1768	319	—
1850	448	+40.4%
1900	492	+9.8%
1950	598	+21.5%
1990	795	+32.9%
2000	1,084	+36.4%

== Heritage sites of national significance ==
The prehistoric settlement known as Chapf and the Gasthaus (combination hotel and restaurant) Anker, which was built on the site of a late-Roman Rhine fort, are listed as Swiss heritage sites of national significance.

== Economy ==
As of 2007, Mumpf had an unemployment rate of 2.83%. As of 2005, there were 16 people employed in the primary economic sector and about 6 businesses involved in this sector. 43 people are employed in the secondary sector and there are 12 businesses in this sector. 75 people are employed in the tertiary sector, with 28 businesses in this sector.

In 2000 there were 569 workers who lived in the municipality. Of these, 469 or about 82.4% of the residents worked outside Mumpf while 72 people commuted into the municipality for work. There were a total of 172 jobs (of at least 6 hours per week) in the municipality. Of the working population, 19.2% used public transportation to get to work, and 53.6% used a private car.

== Religion ==
From the 2000 census, 535 or 49.4% were Roman Catholic, while 248 or 22.9% belonged to the Swiss Reformed Church. Of the rest of the population, there were 18 individuals (or about 1.66% of the population) who belonged to the Christian Catholic faith.

== Transport ==
Mumpf sits on the Bözberg railway line and served by local trains at Mumpf.

== Education ==
In Mumpf about 65.1% of the population (between age 25-64) have completed either non-mandatory upper secondary education or additional higher education (either university or a Fachhochschule). Of the school age population (in the 2008/2009 school year), there are 101 students attending primary school, there are 151 students attending secondary school in the municipality.
