= Schupfart =

- Municipality
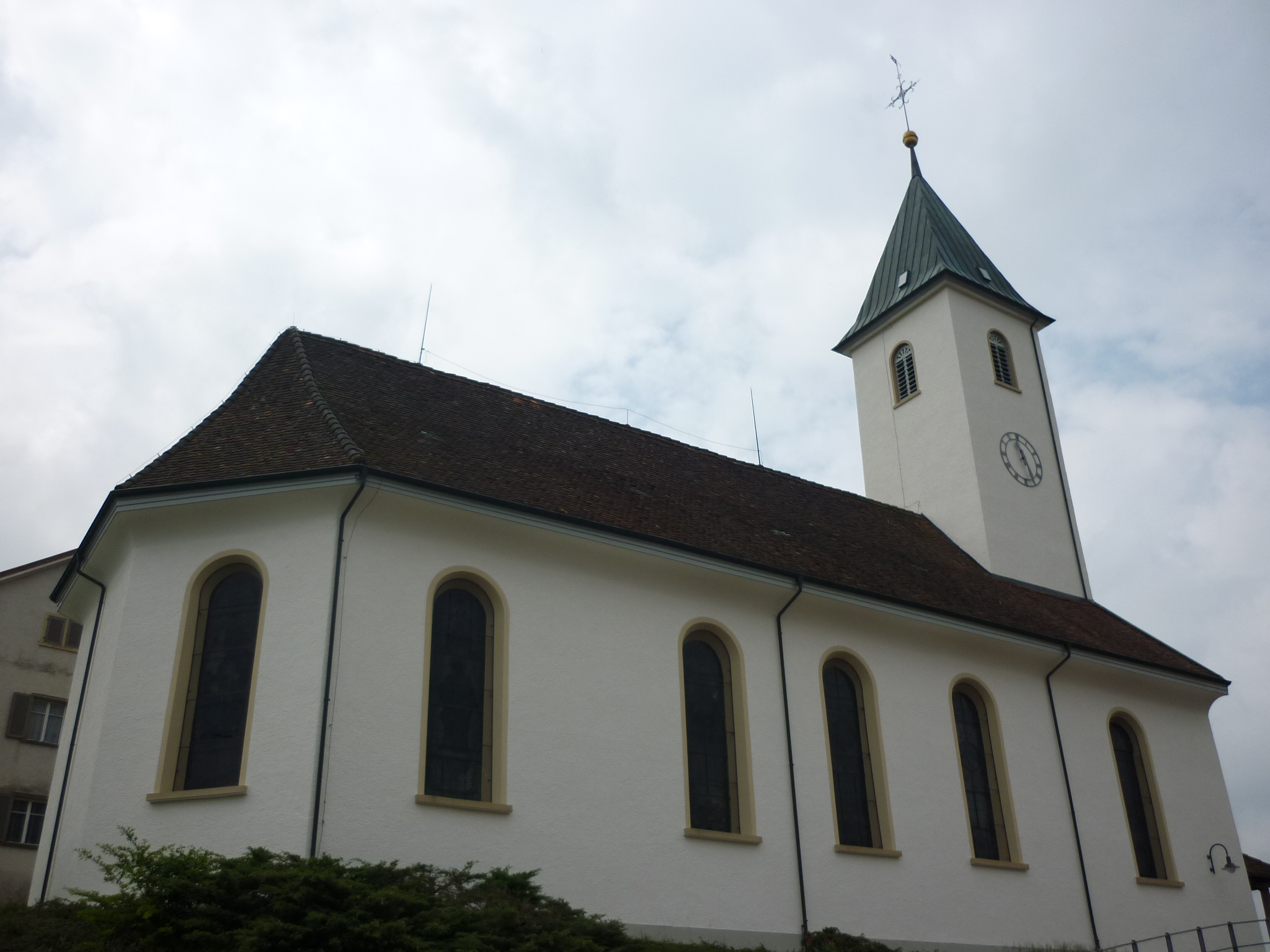

- Flag Coat of arms
- Location of Schupfart
- Location within Switzerland Location within Canton of Aargau
- Coordinates: 47°31′N 7°58′E
- Country: Switzerland
- Canton: Aargau
- District: Rheinfelden

Area
  - Total: 7.04 km^{2} (2.72 sq mi)
- Elevation: 457 m (1,499 ft)

Population (December 2005)
  - Total: 750
  - Density: 110/km^{2} (280/sq mi)
- Time zone: UTC+01:00 (CET)
  - Summer (DST): UTC+02:00 (CEST)
- Postal code: 4325
- SFOS number: 4259
- ISO 3166 code: CH-AG
- Surrounded by: Eiken, Frick, Gipf-Oberfrick, Hellikon, Münchwilen, Obermumpf, Wegenstetten
- Website: www.schupfart.ch

Schupfart is a municipality in the district of Rheinfelden in the canton of Aargau in Switzerland.

== Geography ==
Aerial view (1958)

Schupfart has an area, as of 2009, of 7.04 square kilometers (2.72 sq mi). Of this area, 4.23 km^{2} (1.63 sq mi) or 60.1% is used for agricultural purposes, while 2.28 km^{2} (0.88 sq mi) or 32.4% is forested. Of the rest of the land, 0.49 km^{2} (0.19 sq mi) or 7.0% is settled (buildings or roads), 0.01 km^{2} (2.5 acres) or 0.1% is either rivers or lakes.

Of the built up area, housing and buildings made up 2.7% and transportation infrastructure made up 3.6%. Out of the forested land, 30.5% of the total land area is heavily forested and 1.8% is covered with orchards or small clusters of trees. Of the agricultural land, 39.1% is used for growing crops and 16.5% is pastures, while 4.5% is used for orchards or vine crops. All the water in the municipality is in rivers and streams.

== Coat of arms ==
The blazon of the municipal coat of arms is Argent a Linden-leaf slipped Vert.

== Demographics ==
Schupfart has a population (as of December 2020) of 803. As of June 2009, 8.2% of the population are foreign nationals. Over the last 10 years (1997–2007) the population has changed at a rate of 13.7%. Most of the population (as of 2000) speaks German (96.5%), with Albanian being second most common ( 2.3%) and Italian being third ( 0.6%).

The age distribution, as of 2008, in Schupfart is; 78 children or 10.2% of the population are between 0 and 9 years old and 91 teenagers or 12.0% are between 10 and 19. Of the adult population, 96 people or 12.6% of the population are between 20 and 29 years old. 103 people or 13.5% are between 30 and 39, 145 people or 19.1% are between 40 and 49, and 108 people or 14.2% are between 50 and 59. The senior population distribution is 70 people or 9.2% of the population are between 60 and 69 years old, 36 people or 4.7% are between 70 and 79, there are 28 people or 3.7% who are between 80 and 89, and there are 6 people or 0.8% who are 90 and older.

As of 2000, there were 20 homes with 1 or 2 persons in the household, 116 homes with 3 or 4 persons in the household, and 121 homes with 5 or more persons in the household. As of 2000, there were 262 private households (homes and apartments) in the municipality, and an average of 2.6 persons per household. In 2008 there were 128 single family homes (or 40.1% of the total) out of a total of 319 homes and apartments. There were a total of 3 empty apartments for a 0.9% vacancy rate. As of 2007, the construction rate of new housing units was 9.4 new units per 1000 residents.

In the 2007 federal election the most popular party was the SVP which received 42.09% of the vote. The next three most popular parties were the CVP (25.33%), the SP (10.82%) and the FDP (7.37%). In the federal election, a total of 226 votes were cast, and the voter turnout was 40.7%.

The historical population is given in the following table:

Historical population
Year	Pop.	±%
1975	539	—
1980	536	−0.6%
1990	558	+4.1%
2000	685	+22.8%

== Heritage sites of national significance ==
The Herrain, a formerly fortified hill, is listed as a Swiss heritage site of national significance.

== Economy ==
As of 2007, Schupfart had an unemployment rate of 1.77%. As of 2005, there were 72 people employed in the primary economic sector and about 28 businesses involved in this sector. 37 people are employed in the secondary sector and there are 9 businesses in this sector. 55 people are employed in the tertiary sector, with 17 businesses in this sector.

In 2000 there were 347 workers who lived in the municipality. Of these, 281 or about 81.0% of the residents worked outside Schupfart while 41 people commuted into the municipality for work. There were a total of 107 jobs (of at least 6 hours per week) in the municipality. Of the working population, 9.7% used public transportation to get to work, and 67.3% used a private car.

== Religion ==
From the 2000 census, 518 or 76.1% were Roman Catholic, while 95 or 14.0% belonged to the Swiss Reformed Church. Of the rest of the population, there were 12 individuals (or about 1.76% of the population) who belonged to the Christian Catholic faith.

== Education ==
In Schupfart about 76.2% of the population (between age 25-64) have completed either non-mandatory upper secondary education or additional higher education (either university or a Fachhochschule). Of the school age population (in the 2008/2009 school year), there are 49 students attending primary school in the municipality.
