= Wegenstetten =

- Municipality
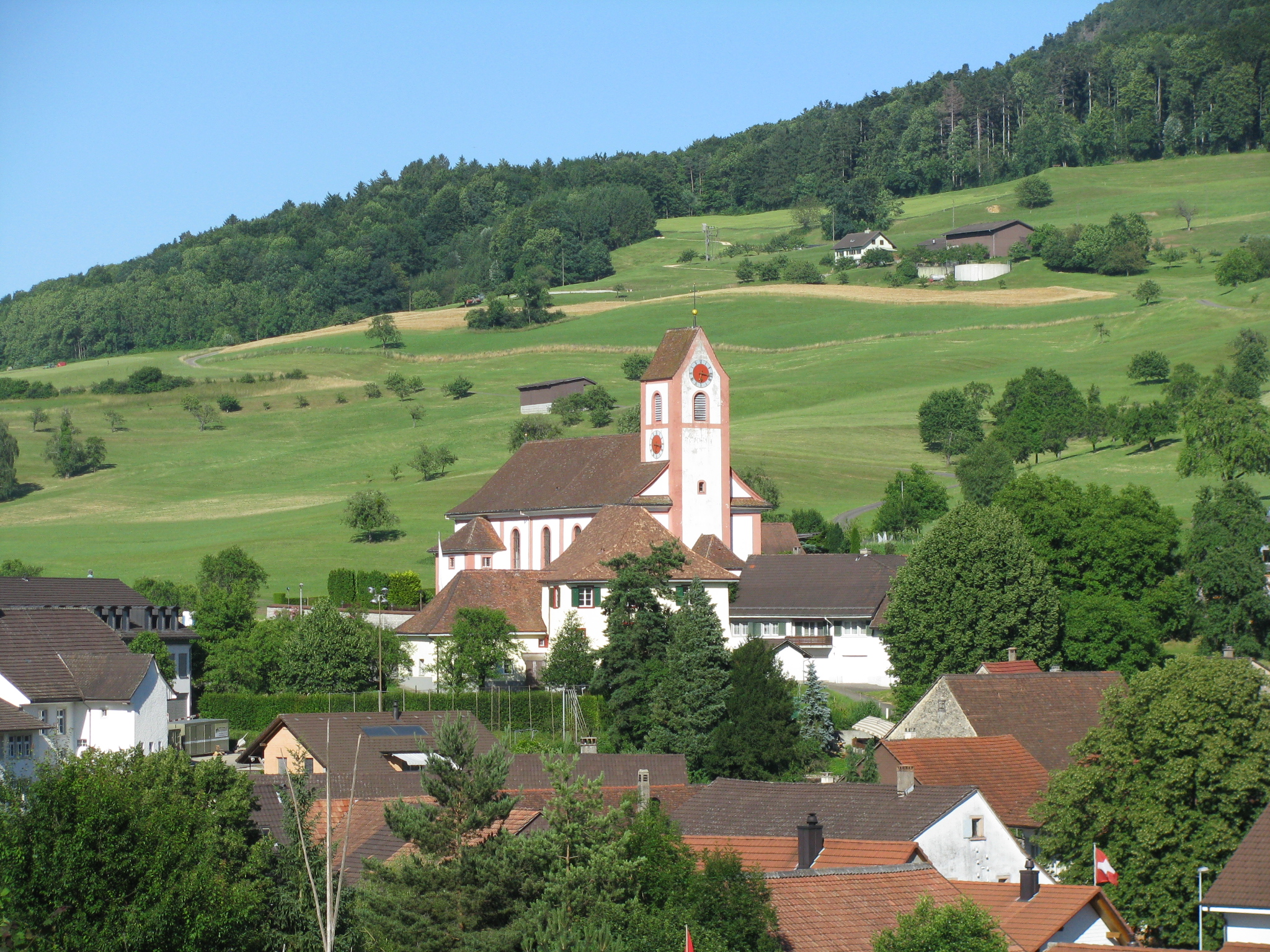
- Wegenstetten village and church

- Flag Coat of arms
- Location of Wegenstetten
- Location within Switzerland Location within Canton of Aargau
- Coordinates: 47°30′N 7°56′E
- Country: Switzerland
- Canton: Aargau
- District: Rheinfelden

Area
  - Total: 7.13 km^{2} (2.75 sq mi)
- Elevation: 441 m (1,447 ft)

Population (December 2005)
  - Total: 1,066
  - Density: 150/km^{2} (387/sq mi)
- Time zone: UTC+01:00 (CET)
  - Summer (DST): UTC+02:00 (CEST)
- Postal code: 4317
- SFOS number: 4262
- ISO 3166 code: CH-AG
- Surrounded by: Gipf-Oberfrick, Hellikon, Hemmiken (BL), Rothenfluh (BL), Schupfart, Wittnau
- Website: www.wegenstetten.ch

Wegenstetten is a municipality in the district of Rheinfelden in the canton of Aargau in Switzerland.

== Geography ==
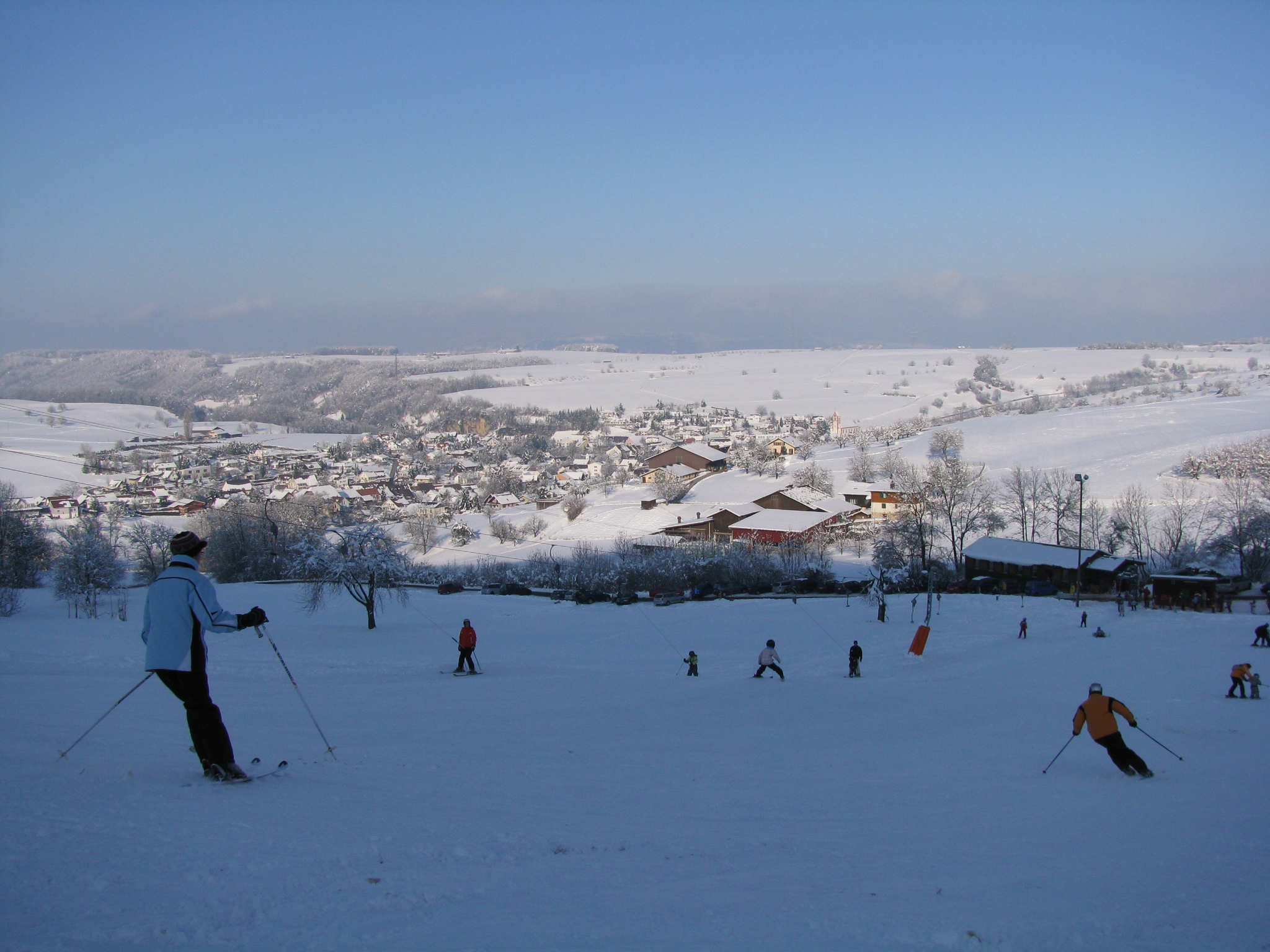
Foehrlimatt ski area near Wegenstetten

Aerial view (1958)

Wegenstetten has an area, as of 2009, of 7.13 square kilometers (2.75 sq mi). Of this area, 4.11 km^{2} (1.59 sq mi) or 57.6% is used for agricultural purposes, while 2.39 km^{2} (0.92 sq mi) or 33.5% is forested. Of the rest of the land, 0.59 km^{2} (0.23 sq mi) or 8.3% is settled (buildings or roads), 0.01 km^{2} (2.5 acres) or 0.1% is either rivers or lakes.

Of the built up area, housing and buildings made up 4.8% and transportation infrastructure made up 2.5%. Out of the forested land, 30.7% of the total land area is heavily forested and 2.8% is covered with orchards or small clusters of trees. Of the agricultural land, 26.9% is used for growing crops and 28.3% is pastures, while 2.4% is used for orchards or vine crops. All the water in the municipality is flowing water.

== Coat of arms ==
The blazon of the municipal coat of arms is Gules a Wall fesswise embattled and with loopholes Sable.

== Demographics ==
Wegenstetten has a population (as of December 2020) of 1,040 As of June 2009, 7.9% of the population are foreign nationals. Over the last 10 years (1997–2007) the population has changed at a rate of 6.2%. Most of the population (as of 2000) speaks German(95.8%), with Serbo-Croatian being second most common ( 1.5%) and Albanian being third ( 1.2%).

The age distribution, as of 2008, in Wegenstetten is; 116 children or 10.6% of the population are between 0 and 9 years old and 146 teenagers or 13.3% are between 10 and 19. Of the adult population, 129 people or 11.8% of the population are between 20 and 29 years old. 124 people or 11.3% are between 30 and 39, 176 people or 16.1% are between 40 and 49, and 158 people or 14.4% are between 50 and 59. The senior population distribution is 123 people or 11.2% of the population are between 60 and 69 years old, 72 people or 6.6% are between 70 and 79, there are 41 people or 3.7% who are between 80 and 89, and there are 9 people or 0.8% who are 90 and older.

As of 2000, there were 16 homes with 1 or 2 persons in the household, 153 homes with 3 or 4 persons in the household, and 193 homes with 5 or more persons in the household. As of 2000, there were 365 private households (homes and apartments) in the municipality, and an average of 2.7 persons per household. In 2008 there were 255 single family homes (or 57.6% of the total) out of a total of 443 homes and apartments. There were a total of 3 empty apartments for a 0.7% vacancy rate. As of 2007, the construction rate of new housing units was 1.9 new units per 1000 residents.

In the 2007 federal election the most popular party was the SVP which received 31.76% of the vote. The next three most popular parties were the CVP (19.36%), the Green Party (12.54%) and the FDP (11.06%). In the federal election, a total of 370 votes were cast, and the voter turnout was 46.9%.

The historical population is given in the following table:

Historical population
Year	Pop.	±%
1975	643	—
1980	686	+6.7%
1990	863	+25.8%
2000	1,009	+16.9%

== Sights ==
The entire village of Wegenstetten is designated as part of the Inventory of Swiss Heritage Sites.

== Economy ==
As of 2007, Wegenstetten had an unemployment rate of 1.1%. As of 2005, there were 66 people employed in the primary economic sector and about 19 businesses involved in this sector. 21 people are employed in the secondary sector and there are 7 businesses in this sector. 95 people are employed in the tertiary sector, with 24 businesses in this sector.

In 2000 there were 465 workers who lived in the municipality. Of these, 357 or about 76.8% of the residents worked outside Wegenstetten while 59 people commuted into the municipality for work. There were a total of 167 jobs (of at least 6 hours per week) in the municipality. Of the working population, 13.5% used public transportation to get to work, and 55.8% used a private car.

== Religion ==
From the 2000 census, 613 or 61.7% were Roman Catholic, while 214 or 21.5% belonged to the Swiss Reformed Church. Of the rest of the population, there were 60 individuals (or about 6.04% of the population) who belonged to the Christian Catholic faith.

== Education ==
In Wegenstetten about 75.8% of the population (between age 25-64) have completed either non-mandatory upper secondary education or additional higher education (either university or a Fachhochschule). Of the school age population (in the 2008/2009 school year), there are 91 students attending primary school, there are 68 students attending secondary school in the municipality.

Wegenstetten is home to the Schul-u.Gde.Bibliothek Wegenstetten (school and municipal library of Wegenstetten). The library has (as of 2008) 1,300 books or other media, and loaned out 680 items in the same year. It was open a total of 50 days with average of 1.5 hours per week during that year.
