= Zeiningen =

- Municipality
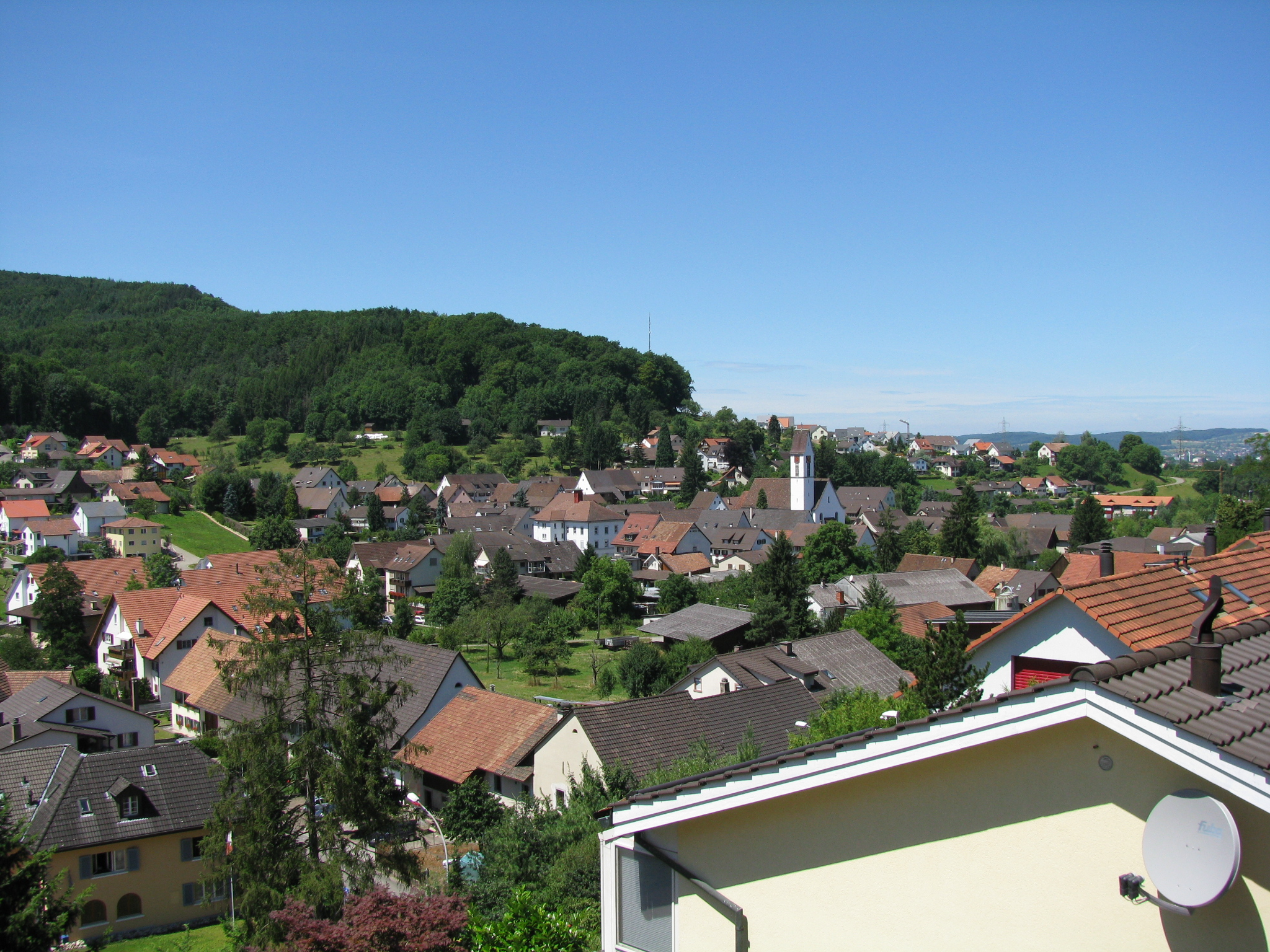
- Zeiningen village

- Flag Coat of arms
- Location of Zeiningen
- Location within Switzerland Location within Canton of Aargau
- Coordinates: 47°33′N 7°52′E
- Country: Switzerland
- Canton: Aargau
- District: Rheinfelden

Area
  - Total: 11.37 km^{2} (4.39 sq mi)
- Elevation: 342 m (1,122 ft)

Population (December 2005)
  - Total: 2,102
  - Density: 184.9/km^{2} (478.8/sq mi)
- Time zone: UTC+01:00 (CET)
  - Summer (DST): UTC+02:00 (CEST)
- Postal code: 4314
- SFOS number: 4263
- ISO 3166 code: CH-AG
- Surrounded by: Buus (BL), Maisprach (BL), Möhlin, Mumpf, Wallbach, Zuzgen
- Website: www.zeiningen.ch

Zeiningen is a municipality in the district of Rheinfelden in the canton of Aargau in Switzerland.

== Geography ==
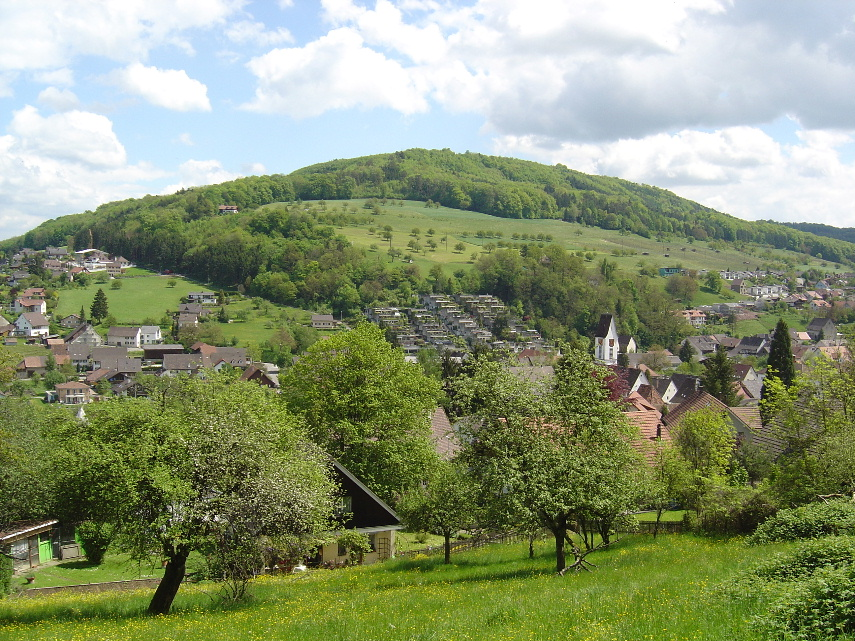
Zeiningen village

Aerial view (1954)

Zeiningen has an area, as of 2009, of 11.37 square kilometers (4.39 sq mi). Of this area, 4.99 km^{2} (1.93 sq mi) or 43.9% is used for agricultural purposes, while 5.02 km^{2} (1.94 sq mi) or 44.2% is forested. Of the rest of the land, 1.35 km^{2} (0.52 sq mi) or 11.9% is settled (buildings or roads) and 0.01 km^{2} (2.5 acres) or 0.1% is unproductive land.

Of the built up area, housing and buildings made up 4.1% and transportation infrastructure made up 5.5%. Power and water infrastructure as well as other special developed areas made up 1.4% of the area Out of the forested land, 42.5% of the total land area is heavily forested and 1.7% is covered with orchards or small clusters of trees. Of the agricultural land, 26.7% is used for growing crops and 13.2% is pastures, while 4.0% is used for orchards or vine crops.

Ägelsee is a small lake and nature preserve located in the municipality.

== Coat of arms ==
The blazon of the municipal coat of arms is Or a Vine-tree Vert fructed Azure staked proper issuant from Coupeaux of the second.

== Demographics ==
Zeiningen has a population (as of December 2020) of 2,400 As of June 2009, 10.6% of the population are foreign nationals. Over the last 10 years (1997–2007) the population has changed at a rate of 23.5%. Most of the population (as of 2000) speaks German(94.3%), with Albanian being second most common ( 1.5%) and Italian being third ( 1.1%).

The age distribution, as of 2008, in Zeiningen is; 234 children or 10.6% of the population are between 0 and 9 years old and 251 teenagers or 11.4% are between 10 and 19. Of the adult population, 244 people or 11.1% of the population are between 20 and 29 years old. 308 people or 14.0% are between 30 and 39, 391 people or 17.8% are between 40 and 49, and 329 people or 15.0% are between 50 and 59. The senior population distribution is 245 people or 11.1% of the population are between 60 and 69 years old, 126 people or 5.7% are between 70 and 79, there are 61 people or 2.8% who are between 80 and 89, and there are 10 people or 0.5% who are 90 and older.

As of 2000, there were 67 homes with 1 or 2 persons in the household, 317 homes with 3 or 4 persons in the household, and 329 homes with 5 or more persons in the household. As of 2000, there were 731 private households (homes and apartments) in the municipality, and an average of 2.4 persons per household. In 2008 there were 481 single family homes (or 48.8% of the total) out of a total of 985 homes and apartments. There were a total of 10 empty apartments for a 1.0% vacancy rate. As of 2007, the construction rate of new housing units was 4.2 new units per 1000 residents.

In the 2007 federal election the most popular party was the SVP which received 30.3% of the vote. The next three most popular parties were the CVP (19.07%), the SP (17.61%) and the FDP (13.68%). In the federal election, a total of 649 votes were cast, and the voter turnout was 41.5%.

The historical population is given in the following table:

Historical population
Year	Pop.	±%
1975	1,275	—
1980	1,367	+7.2%
1990	1,639	+19.9%
2000	1,828	+11.5%

== Heritage sites of national significance ==
Möhliner field, a rich collection of prehistoric items, is listed as a Swiss heritage site of national significance.

== Economy ==
As of 2007, Zeiningen had an unemployment rate of 2.3%. As of 2005, there were 81 people employed in the primary economic sector and about 30 businesses involved in this sector. 77 people are employed in the secondary sector and there are 16 businesses in this sector. 264 people are employed in the tertiary sector, with 60 businesses in this sector.

In 2000 there were 953 workers who lived in the municipality. Of these, 741 or about 77.8% of the residents worked outside Zeiningen while 165 people commuted into the municipality for work. There were a total of 377 jobs (of at least 6 hours per week) in the municipality. Of the working population, 15.8% used public transportation to get to work, and 57% used a private car.

== Religion ==
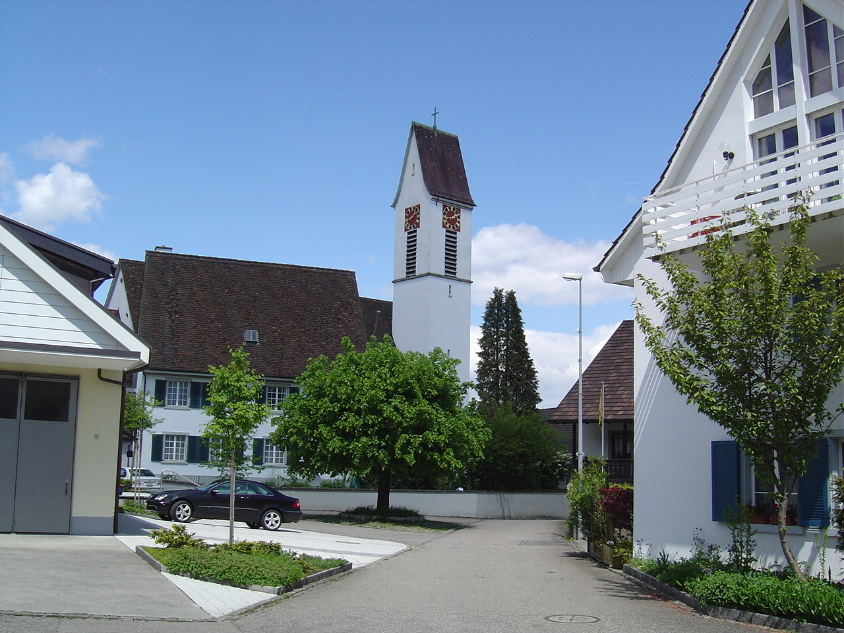
Zeiningen church

From the 2000 census, 975 or 54.3% were Roman Catholic, while 417 or 23.2% belonged to the Swiss Reformed Church. Of the rest of the population, there were 61 individuals (or about 3.39% of the population) who belonged to the Christian Catholic faith.

== Education ==
In Zeiningen about 80.3% of the population (between age 25-64) have completed either non-mandatory upper secondary education or additional higher education (either university or a Fachhochschule). Of the school age population (in the 2008/2009 school year), there are 177 students attending primary school, there are 68 students attending secondary school in the municipality.

Zeiningen is home to the Gemeindebibliothek Zeiningen (municipal library of Zeiningen). The library has (as of 2008) 11,941 books or other media, and loaned out 21,464 items in the same year. It was open a total of 130 days with average of 6 hours per week during that year.
