= Rheinfelden District =

Coordinates: 47°33′N 7°47′E

Rheinfelden District Bezirk Rheinfelden
- District
- Country: Switzerland
- Canton: Aargau
- Capital: Rheinfelden

Area
  - Total: 112.09 km^{2} (43.28 sq mi)

Population (2020)
  - Total: 48,164
  - Density: 429.69/km^{2} (1,112.9/sq mi)
- Time zone: UTC+1 (CET)
  - Summer (DST): UTC+2 (CEST)
- Municipalities: 14

Population

Rheinfelden District lies in the northwest of the canton of Aargau in Switzerland, in the Fricktal region. Its capital is Rheinfelden. Around 88% of the population live in the conurbation of Basel. There are 14 municipalities, with a population of 48,164 (as of 31 December 2020) living in an area of 112.09 km^{2}. The population density is around 355 persons per square kilometre.

== Geography ==
The Rheinfelden district has an area, as of 2009, of 111.98 square kilometres (43.24 sq mi). Of this area, 49.26 km^{2} (19.02 sq mi) or 44.0% is used for agricultural purposes, while 44.45 km^{2} (17.16 sq mi) or 39.7% is forested. Of the rest of the land, 14.96 km^{2} (5.78 sq mi) or 13.4% is settled (buildings or roads).

== Demographics ==
Rheinfelden district has a population (as of December 2020) of 48,164. As of June 2009, 21.3% of the population are foreign nationals.

== Economy ==
In 2000 there were 19,081 workers who lived in the district. Of these, 13,553 or about 71.0% of the residents worked outside the Rheinfelden district while 8,272 people commuted into the district for work. There were a total of 13,800 jobs (of at least 6 hours per week) in the district.

== Religion ==
From the 2000 census, 14,982 or 40.2% were Roman Catholic, while 11,153 or 29.9% belonged to the Swiss Reformed Church. Of the rest of the population, there were 2 474 who belonged to the Christian Catholic faith.

== Education ==
Of the school age population (in the 2008/2009 school year), there are 3,090 students attending primary school, there are 1,111 students attending secondary school, there are 734 students attending tertiary or university level schooling, and there are 32 students who are seeking a job after school in the municipality.

== Municipalities ==
| Coat of arms | Municipality | Population (31 December 2020) | Area, km^{2} |
|---|---|---|---|
| | Hellikon | 780 | 7.05 |
| | Kaiseraugst | 5,550 | 4.91 |
| | Magden | 3,872 | 11.01 |
| | Möhlin | 11,088 | 18.79 |
| | Mumpf | 1,543 | 3.1 |
| | Obermumpf | 1,048 | 5.03 |
| | Olsberg | 356 | 4.62 |
| | Rheinfelden | 13,551 | 16.03 |
| | Schupfart | 803 | 7.04 |
| | Stein | 3,253 | 2.81 |
| | Wallbach | 1,999 | 4.51 |
| | Wegenstetten | 1,040 | 7.13 |
| | Zeiningen | 2,400 | 11.37 |
| | Zuzgen | 881 | 8.39 |
