= Möhlin =

- Municipality
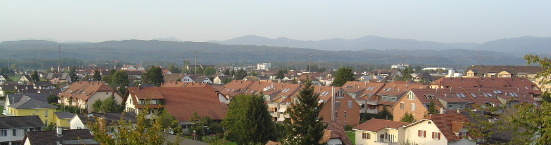

- Flag Coat of arms
- Location of Möhlin
- Location within Switzerland Location within Canton of Aargau
- Coordinates: 47°33′N 7°51′E
- Country: Switzerland
- Canton: Aargau
- District: Rheinfelden

Government
  - Mayor: Markus Fäs

Area
  - Total: 18.79 km^{2} (7.25 sq mi)
- Elevation: 310 m (1,020 ft)

Population (December 2010)
  - Total: 10,025
  - Density: 533.5/km^{2} (1,382/sq mi)
- Time zone: UTC+01:00 (CET)
  - Summer (DST): UTC+02:00 (CEST)
- Postal code: 4313
- SFOS number: 4254
- ISO 3166 code: CH-AG
- Localities: Obermöhlin, Untermöhlin, Riburg
- Surrounded by: Magden, Maisprach (BL), Rheinfelden, Schwörstadt (DE-BW), Wallbach, Wehr (DE-BW), Zeiningen
- Website: www.moehlin.ch

Möhlin (German pronunciation: [ˈmøːlin]) is a municipality in the district of Rheinfelden in the canton of Aargau in Switzerland.

== History ==
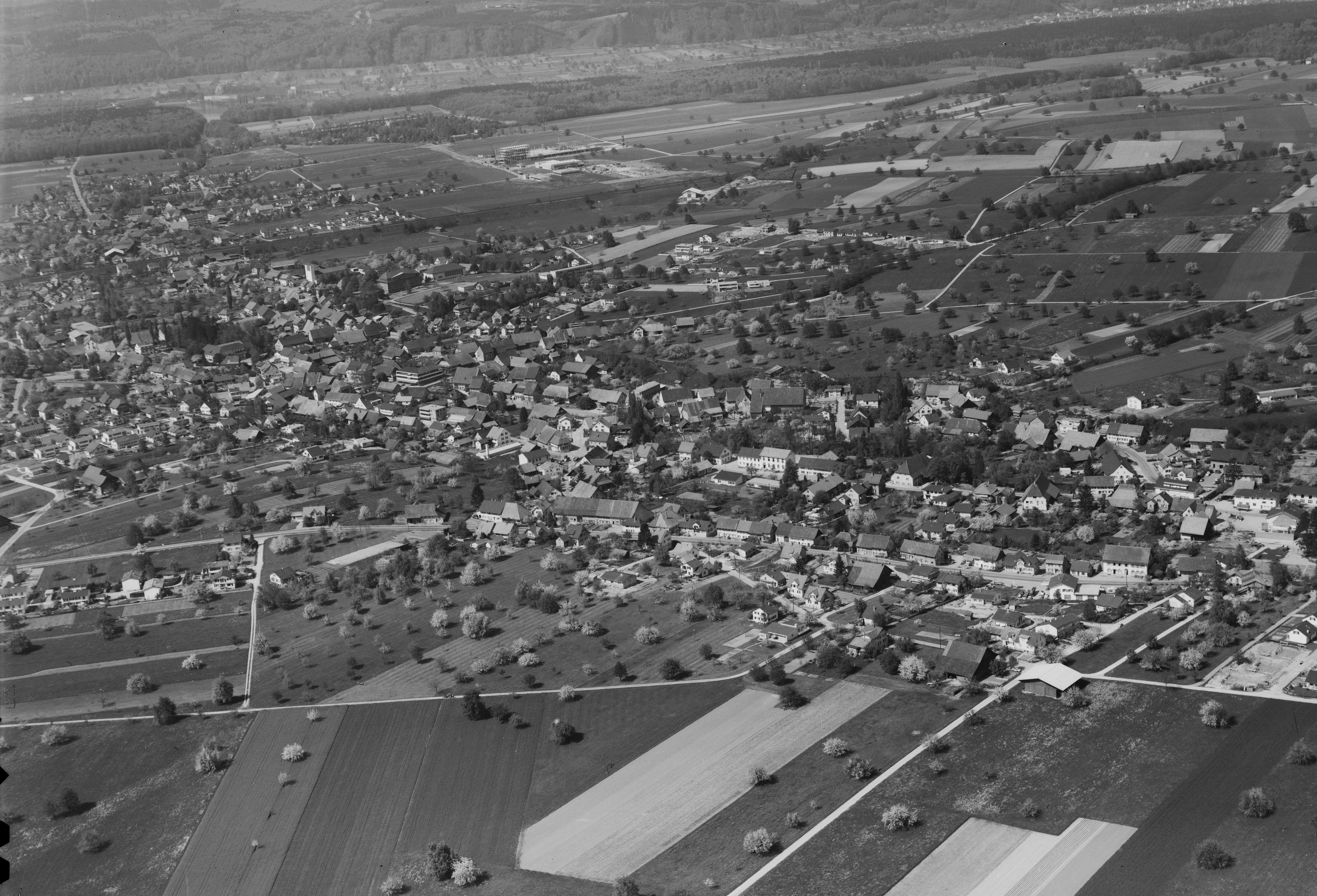
Aerial view (1965)

The area around Möhlin was prehistorically settled. A Neolithic settlement has been discovered at Chleizelgli, while scattered Bronze Age items were discovered around the municipality. There was a Roman era estate as well as three watchtowers along the Rhine river. During the Early to High Middle Ages it was the site of fortified refuge.

The modern village of Möhlin is first mentioned in 794 as Melina. In the 13th century a knight in the service of the House of Zähringen and a 15th-century Rheinfeld Schultheiss (mayor) both had the name von Meli, which is derived from Möhlin.

The municipality of Möhlin came into being when eight hamlets merged over the course of the 15th century. Jurors (a group of men of good character that were used to investigate crimes and/or judge the accused) from Möhlin are first mentioned in 1473. From 1135 until 1797, the village was under Habsburg-Austrian rule. It was a part of the region of Möhlinbach in the Rheinfelden district. Both the high and low courts over the district were under Austrian control. In 1803 the entire Fricktal, including Möhlin, joined the newly founded Canton of Aargau. The settlement of Rappershausen was destroyed during the Thirty Years' War.

The church appears in the 8th century with Germanus as its patron saint. In the 10th century it is again mentioned, but this time the patron is Saint Leodegar. The original building was replaced with a new church in 1609. In 1314 the patronage of the church was granted by the Abbey of Ettenheim in Breisgau to James of Wart. A few years later, in 1327, it was granted to the Teutonic Knights Order House in Beuggen. Between 1803 and 1863 the patronage was held by the Canton of Aargau. The two chapels in Obermöhlin and Riburg date from the 17th and the early 18th century. The Christian Catholic parish was established in 1873, and took over the church at that time. The church was renovated in 1954. In the 1940s, a Catholic and a Reformed church were built.

In 1932, the Bata Shoes company opened its factory in Möhlin. The factory buildings and the surrounding residential areas were modeled on the original urban design of the city of Zlín, Czechoslovakia.

== Geography ==
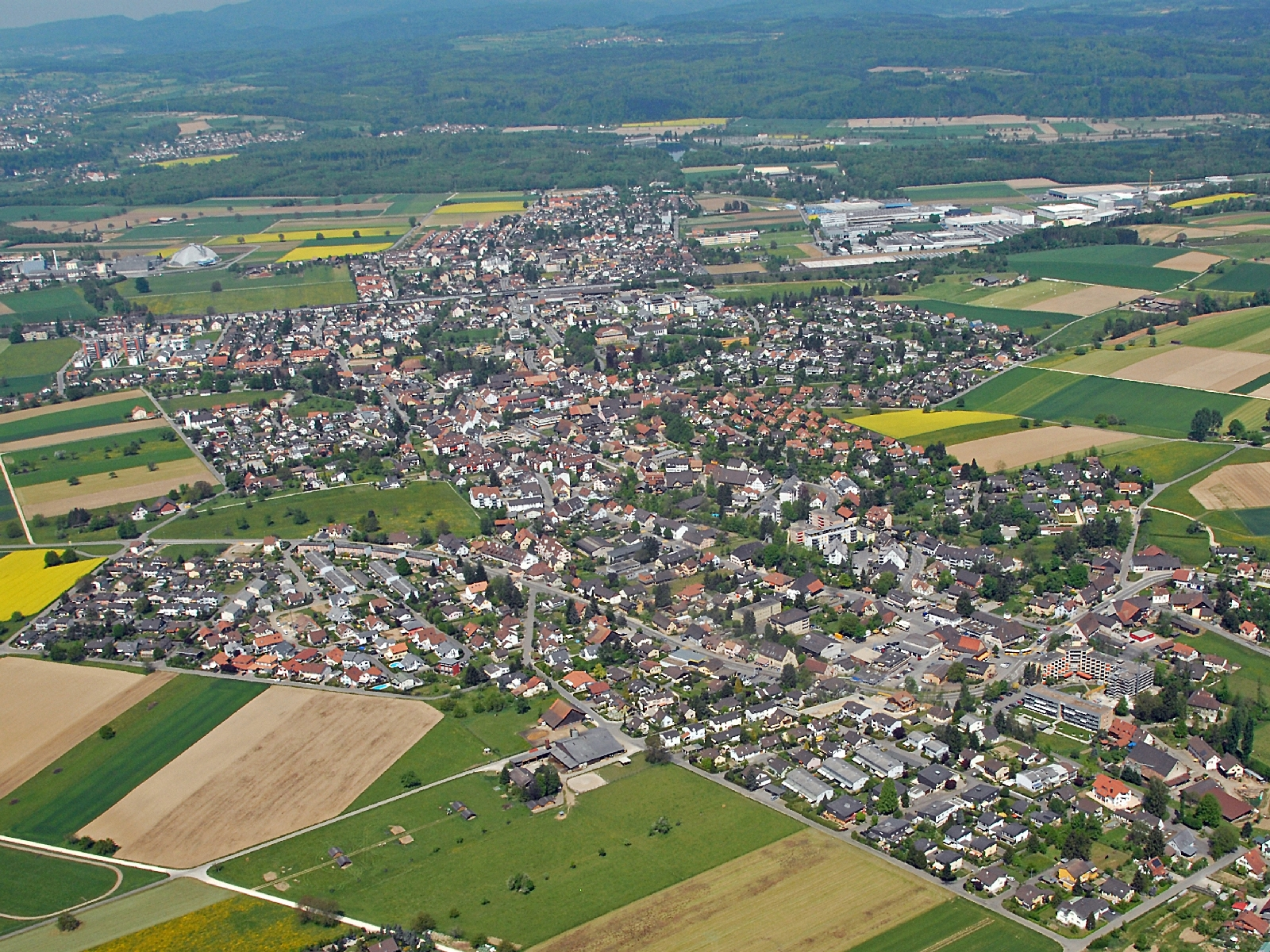
Aerial view

Möhlin has an area, as of 2009, of 18.79 square kilometers (7.25 sq mi). Of this area, 7.89 km^{2} (3.05 sq mi) or 42.0% is used for agricultural purposes, while 6.87 km^{2} (2.65 sq mi) or 36.6% is forested. Of the rest of the land, 3.48 km^{2} (1.34 sq mi) or 18.5% is settled (buildings or roads), 0.59 km^{2} (0.23 sq mi) or 3.1% is either rivers or lakes and 0.02 km^{2} (4.9 acres) or 0.1% is unproductive land.

Of the built-up area, industrial buildings made up 2.7% of the total area while housing and buildings made up 9.5% and transportation infrastructure made up 4.6%. Out of the forested land, all of the forested land area is covered with heavy forests. Of the agricultural land, 33.2% is used for growing crops and 7.5% is pastures, while 1.3% is used for orchards or vine crops. All the water in the municipality is in rivers and streams.

The municipality is located in the Rheinfelden district, along the Möhlinbach (Möhlin stream). It consists of the two parts Obermöhlin (Upper Möhlin) and Untermöhlin (Lower Möhlin) in the south of the railway line and of Riburg in the north.

== Coat of arms ==
The blazon of the municipal coat of arms is Gules a garb Or ensigned with a Sickle Azure handled Sable.

== Demographics ==
Möhlin has a population (as of December 2020) of 11,088. As of June 2009, 21.3% of the population are foreign nationals. Over the last 10 years (1997–2007) the population has changed at a rate of 14.7%. Most of the population (as of 2000) speaks German (87.8%), with Italian being second most common ( 3.5%) and Albanian being third ( 1.9%).

The age distribution, as of 2008, in Möhlin is; 1,042 children or 10.9% of the population are between 0 and 9 years old and 1,148 teenagers or 12.0% are between 10 and 19. Of the adult population, 1,143 people or 12.0% of the population are between 20 and 29 years old. 1,423 people or 14.9% are between 30 and 39, 1,655 people or 17.3% are between 40 and 49, and 1,234 people or 12.9% are between 50 and 59. The senior population distribution is 951 people or 10.0% of the population are between 60 and 69 years old, 631 people or 6.6% are between 70 and 79, there are 288 people or 3.0% who are between 80 and 89, and there are 36 people or 0.4% who are 90 and older.

As of 2000 the average number of residents per living room was 0.58 which is about equal to the cantonal average of 0.57 per room. In this case, a room is defined as space of a housing unit of at least 4 m^{2} (43 sq ft) as normal bedrooms, dining rooms, living rooms, kitchens and habitable cellars and attics. About 46% of the total households were owner occupied, or in other words did not pay rent (though they may have a mortgage or a rent-to-own agreement).

As of 2000, there were 291 homes with 1 or 2 persons in the household, 1,938 homes with 3 or 4 persons in the household, and 1,109 homes with 5 or more persons in the household. As of 2000, there were 3,412 private households (homes and apartments) in the municipality, and an average of 2.4 persons per household. In 2008 there were 1,542 single family homes (or 36.2% of the total) out of a total of 4,259 homes and apartments. There were a total of 60 empty apartments for a 1.4% vacancy rate. As of 2007, the construction rate of new housing units was 13.5 new units per 1000 residents.

In the 2007 federal election the most popular party was the SVP which received 36.9% of the vote. The next three most popular parties were the SP (19.7%), the FDP (12.3%) and the CVP (11.8%).

The historical population is given in the following table:

Historical population
Year	Pop.	±%
1768	1,102	—
1850	1,940	+76.0%
1900	2,209	+13.9%
1950	3,830	+73.4%
1990	7,157	+86.9%
2000	8,297	+15.9%
2010	10,025	+20.8%

== Points of interest ==
=== Heritage sites of national significance ===
The Bata factory at Batastrasse (719, 743) and three parts of the Roman era Rhine fortifications (the Fahrgraben, the Bürkli in the hamlet of Riburg, and the lower Wehren) are all listed as Swiss heritage sites of national significance.

=== Other ===
- Saldomes, large wooden cupola buildings for storing the Swiss stockpile of road de-icing salt.

== Economy ==
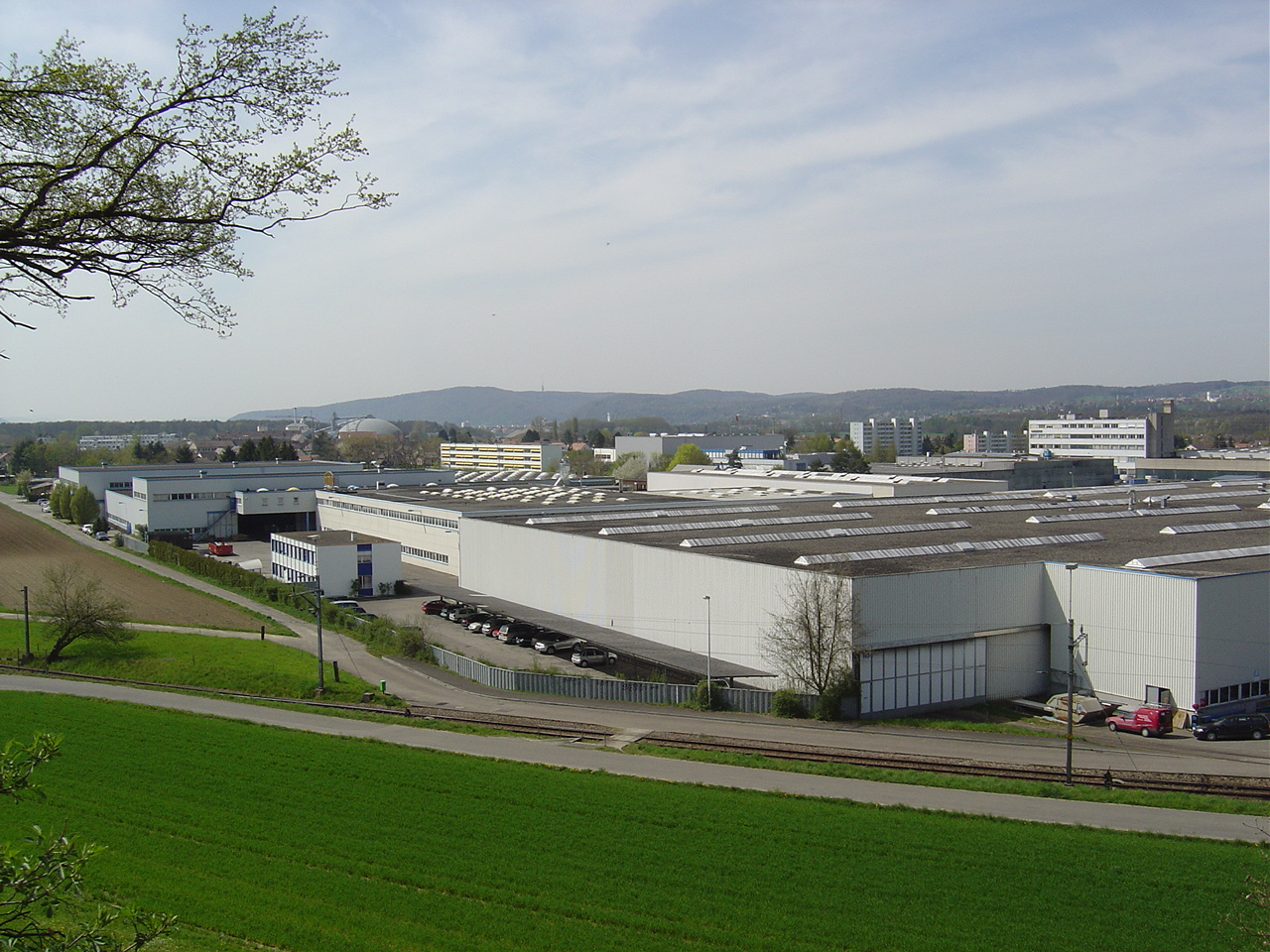
Möhlin industrial park

As of 2007, Möhlin had an unemployment rate of 2.4%. As of 2005, there were 176 people employed in the primary economic sector and about 48 businesses involved in this sector. 841 people are employed in the secondary sector and there are 84 businesses in this sector. 2,498 people are employed in the tertiary sector, with 254 businesses in this sector.

In 2000 there were 4,291 workers who lived in the municipality. Of these, 2,932 or about 68.3% of the residents worked outside Möhlin while 1,444 people commuted into the municipality for work. There were a total of 2,803 jobs (of at least 6 hours per week) in the municipality. Of the working population, 20.2% used public transportation to get to work, and 48.6% used a private car.

== Religion ==
From the 2000 census, 3,121 or 37.6% were Roman Catholic, while 2,381 or 28.7% belonged to the Swiss Reformed Church. Of the rest of the population, there were 1 042 who belonged to the Christian Catholic faith.

== Transport ==
Möhlin sits on the Bözberg railway line and is served by local trains at Möhlin.

== Education ==
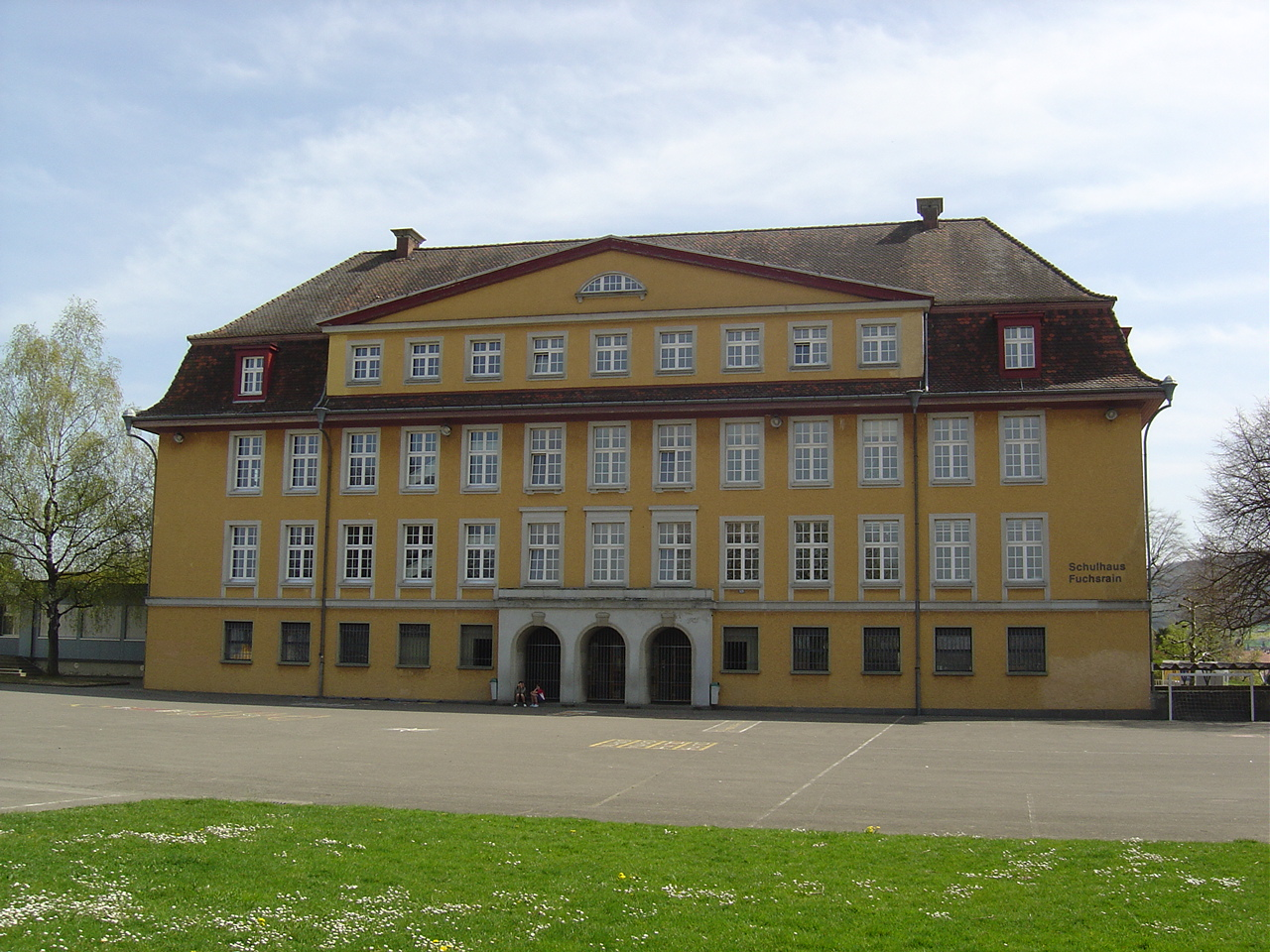
Primary School of Möhlin

In Möhlin about 72.6% of the population (between age 25 and 64) have completed either non-mandatory upper secondary education or additional higher education (either university or a Fachhochschule). Of the school age population (in the 2008/2009 school year), there are 750 students attending primary school, there are 244 students attending secondary school, there are 348 students attending tertiary or university level schooling in the municipality.

Möhlin is home to the Gemeindebibliothek Möhlin (municipal library of Möhlin). The library has (as of 2008) 16,642 books or other media, and loaned out 58,564 items in the same year. It was open a total of 216 days with average of 13 hours per week during that year.

== Notable people ==
- Bruno Hunziker (1930–2000) a Swiss attorney, politician and member of the Swiss federal parliament; raised in Möhlin
- Ivan Rakitić (born 1988 Rheinfelden) a Croatian professional footballer with over 400 club caps who plays for Spanish club Sevilla and for the Croatia national team, with over 100 caps
- Jérôme Kym (2003-) a Swiss professional tennis player
