= Fricktal =

Region of Northwestern Switzerland

Coordinates: 47°30′21.43″N 8°3′7.63″E

The linden leaf was used on the seal of the reeve of Fricktal in the 16th century. In 1802, the linden leaf was used in the seal of the administration of the Canton of Fricktal. Schupfart used argent a linden leaf vert as municipal coat of arms from 1873. Since 1997, the same coat of arms is unofficially used to represent Fricktal.

The Fricktal ("Frick Valley") is a region on Northwestern Switzerland, comprising the Laufenburg and Rheinfelden districts of the Swiss canton of Aargau. The region was known as Frickgau in the medieval period, ultimately from a Late Latin [regio] ferraricia, in reference to the iron mine located here in the Roman era, also transferred to the village of Frick as the main settlement.

Frickgau was part of Breisgau within Further Austria in the early modern period. It was joined to Switzerland only during the Napoleonic period. It now forms a northwestern extension to the canton of Aargau to the east of Basel, between the High Rhine forming the border with Germany in the north and the Jura Mountains in the south.

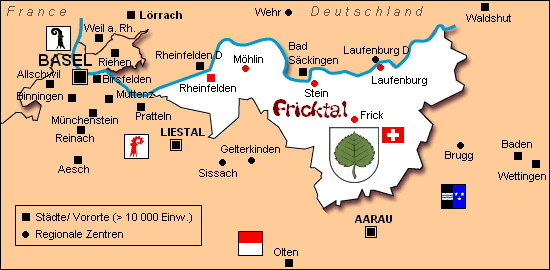
Map of the Fricktal region.

== History ==
In the Early Middle Ages, Fricktal formed part of the Alemannic Augstgau between the Rhine and Aar rivers, from the 10th century onwards of the smaller Frickgau region within Upper Burgundy, owned by the Counts of Homberg-Thierstein in the 11th and 12th centuries. The western Fricktal was held by the Burgundian Lords of Rheinfelden, their last scion Rudolf of Rheinfelden became Duke of Swabia in 1057 and upon his death in 1080 his possessions passed to his son in law Berthold II from the House of Zähringen. After the extinction of the line in 1218, the area eventually passed to the Counts of Habsburg, who already held the Vogtei of Laufenburg.

After the Habsburg dynasty had lost large parts of its original Swabian possessions south of the Rhine to the Swiss Confederacy at the 1386 Battle of Sempach, the remaining Fricktal was administered from the Oberamt Breisgau of Further Austria (Vorderösterreich) at Freiburg, while the adjacent Unteraargau region to the south was finally conquered by the Swiss at Bern in 1415. In 1469 the indebted Archduke Sigismund of Further Austria sold the Breisgau with Fricktal to the Burgundian Duke Charles the Bold, nevertheless upon Charles' death in 1477 it reverted to Archduke Maximilian I of Habsburg by marriage with the duke's daughter Mary the Rich.

In the early 18th century, the citizens of Bern attempted to purchase Fricktal from the Habsburg Emperors without success. Subsequent to the 1797 Treaty of Campo Formio, France occupied Fricktal, and in 1802 it was briefly a canton of the Helvetic Republic, as the Canton of Fricktal. On 9 March 1803, Fricktal was integrated into the Aargau canton of the Swiss Confederation by order of Napoleon.

As of 2014 Fricktal, with its mild climate, is an important location for wine and cherry production as well as a base of the chemical and pharmaceutical industries.
