= BBU =

BBU may refer to:

== Places ==
- Aurel Vlaicu International Airport (IATA airport code: BBU), Romania
- Bhabua Road railway station (train station code: BBU), Mohania, Bihar, India

== Brands, products, items ==
- Backup battery unit
- Base Band Unit, found in IEEE 1914.1
- Volkswagen BBU, a gasoline engine; see List of Volkswagen Group petrol engines

== Companies, groups, organizations ==
- Brookfield Business Partners (stock ticker: BBU)
- Bank of Baroda Uganda Limited
- Bimbo Bakeries USA
- Verband Berlin-Brandenburgischer Wohnungsunternehmen (BBU), part of GdW Bundesverband deutscher Wohnungs- und Immobilienunternehmen
- Beijing Bailie University, Beijing, China
- Build Bright University, Phnom Penh, Cambodia
- Ballistic Bomb Unit, an RAF squadron; see List of RAF squadron codes
- Baptist Bible Union of the General Association of Regular Baptist Churches
- BBU (band), American hip hop group
- Bennett Bowtell Urquhart, Australian supergroup music band

== Other uses ==
- Kulung language (Jarawan) (ISO 639 code: bbu)

== See also ==
- BU (disambiguation)
- 2BU (disambiguation)
