= Buu =

Buu or BUU may refer to:

- Majin Buu, alternate spelling for Majin Boo, a character in Dragon Ball
- Muara Bungo Airport IATA code
- Burlington Municipal Airport (Wisconsin)'s FAA identifier
- Budu language's ISO 639-3 code
- Burapha University
- Geji language

People with the name

- Buu Hoi (1915–1972), Vietnamese diplomat and cancer researcher

== See also ==
- BU (disambiguation)
- Boo (disambiguation)
- Buus, municipality in the canton of Basel-Landschaft, Switzerland
