= 2BU =

2BU may refer to:

- 2BU (song), a 2016 song by Wild Beasts off the album Boy King
- 2BU! Click Awards
- 2BU rail bogie train equipment for New South Wales stainless steel carriage stock

== See also ==
- B2U
- BU (disambiguation)
- BBU (disambiguation)
- Bubu (disambiguation)
