= Magden =

- Municipality
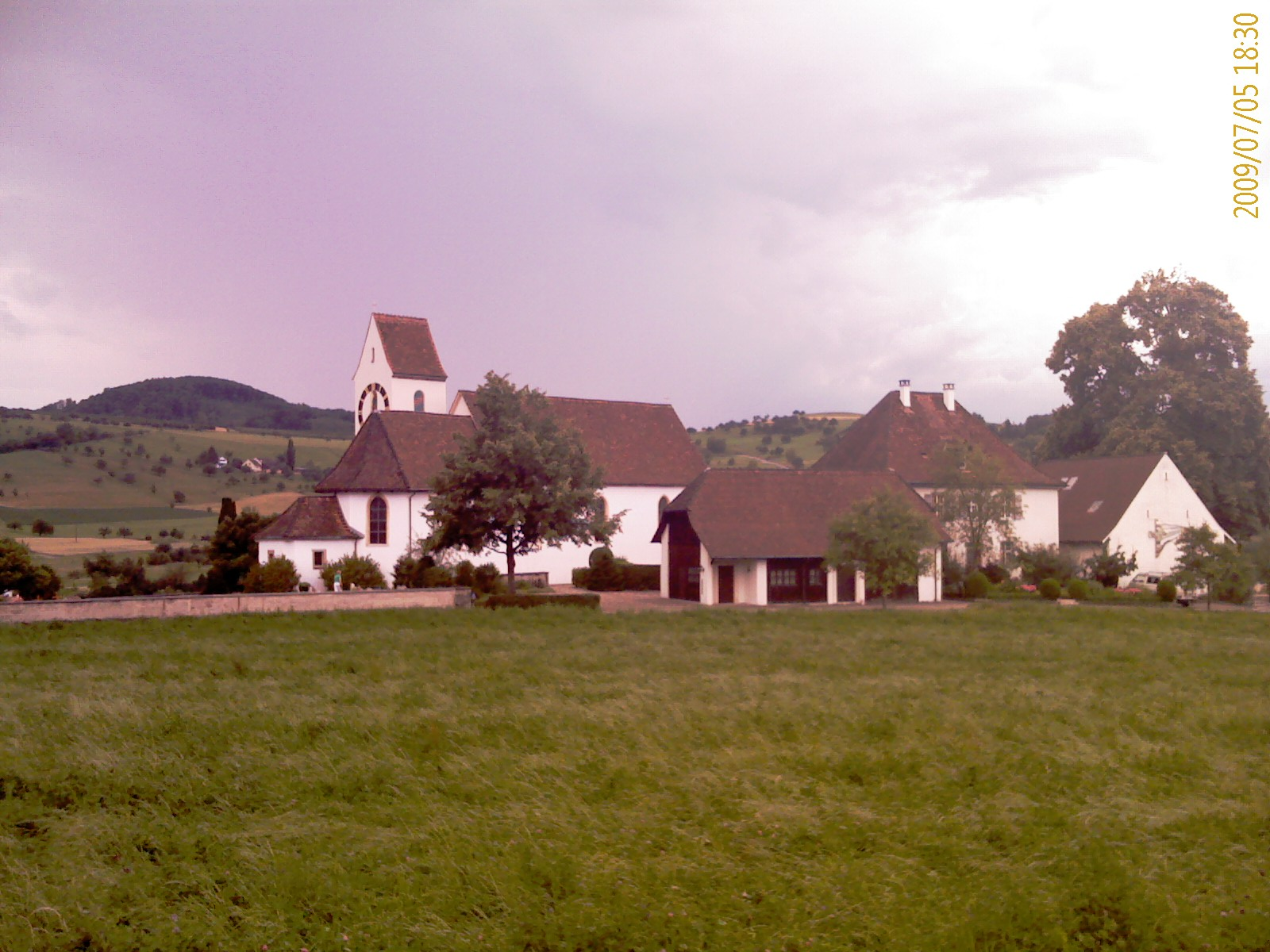
- Magden village and church

- Flag Coat of arms
- Location of Magden
- Location within Switzerland Location within Canton of Aargau
- Coordinates: 47°32′N 7°49′E
- Country: Switzerland
- Canton: Aargau
- District: Rheinfelden

Area
  - Total: 11.01 km^{2} (4.25 sq mi)
- Elevation: 325 m (1,066 ft)

Population (December 2004)
  - Total: 3,249
  - Density: 295.1/km^{2} (764.3/sq mi)
- Time zone: UTC+01:00 (CET)
  - Summer (DST): UTC+02:00 (CEST)
- Postal code: 4312
- SFOS number: 4253
- ISO 3166 code: CH-AG
- Surrounded by: Arisdorf (BL), Hersberg (BL), Maisprach (BL), Möhlin, Nusshof (BL), Olsberg, Rheinfelden, Wintersingen (BL)
- Website: www.magden.ch

Magden (Swiss German: Magde) is a municipality in the district of Rheinfelden in the canton of Aargau in Switzerland.

It is located 3 km to the south of the Rheinfelden. Its Roman name was Magdinium, and it is the site of the ancient Magdalener spring which today serves as the water supply of the Feldschlösschen brewery in Rheinfelden, which was recently acquired by Carlsberg.

== History ==
The first evidence of a human settlement is a Paleolithic/Neolithic village. A few, scattered Roman era items were discovered in Magden. Two empty Alamanni cist graves were also found near the village. The modern municipality of Magden is first mentioned in 804 as in curte Magaduninse. The counts of Thierstein and then their successors the Habsburgs ruled over Magden until 1797. They owned the land and exercised the Zwing und Bann rights over the entire village. With the Act of Mediation in 1803, the entire Fricktal, including Magden, joined the newly created Canton of Aargau. The first school opened in Magden in 1761.

The village church of St. Martin was built during the Frankish Empire. In 1036, Count Ulrich I von Lenzburg granted the patronage right over the village church to the monastery at Beromünster. They transferred the rights in 1351 to the monastery at Olsberg. The current church was built in 1620. When the Capuchin monastery in Rheinfelden was suppressed in 1811, their three altars were transferred to Magden. In 1806 the church came under the authority of the Canton of Aargau. In 1872 the majority of the villagers converted to the Christian Catholic Church of Switzerland. Then, in 1906 the Christian Catholic congregation took over the church. A Roman Catholic church was built in 1969 and a Reformed church was built in 1976.

Nearby Iglingen monastery and its Chapel of St. Niklaus is first mentioned in 1360. A group of Third order lay brothers moved into the monastery grounds in 1465. The monastery church was consecrated in 1509 and in the late 16th Century a convent for nuns was added. The church burned in 1860, and only the choir survived. This was converted to serve as a small chapel.

Toward the end of the 19th Century fruit (especially cherries) orchards replaced the traditional vineyards. After World War II, the chemical industry moved into the Fricktal offering many new jobs.

== Geography ==
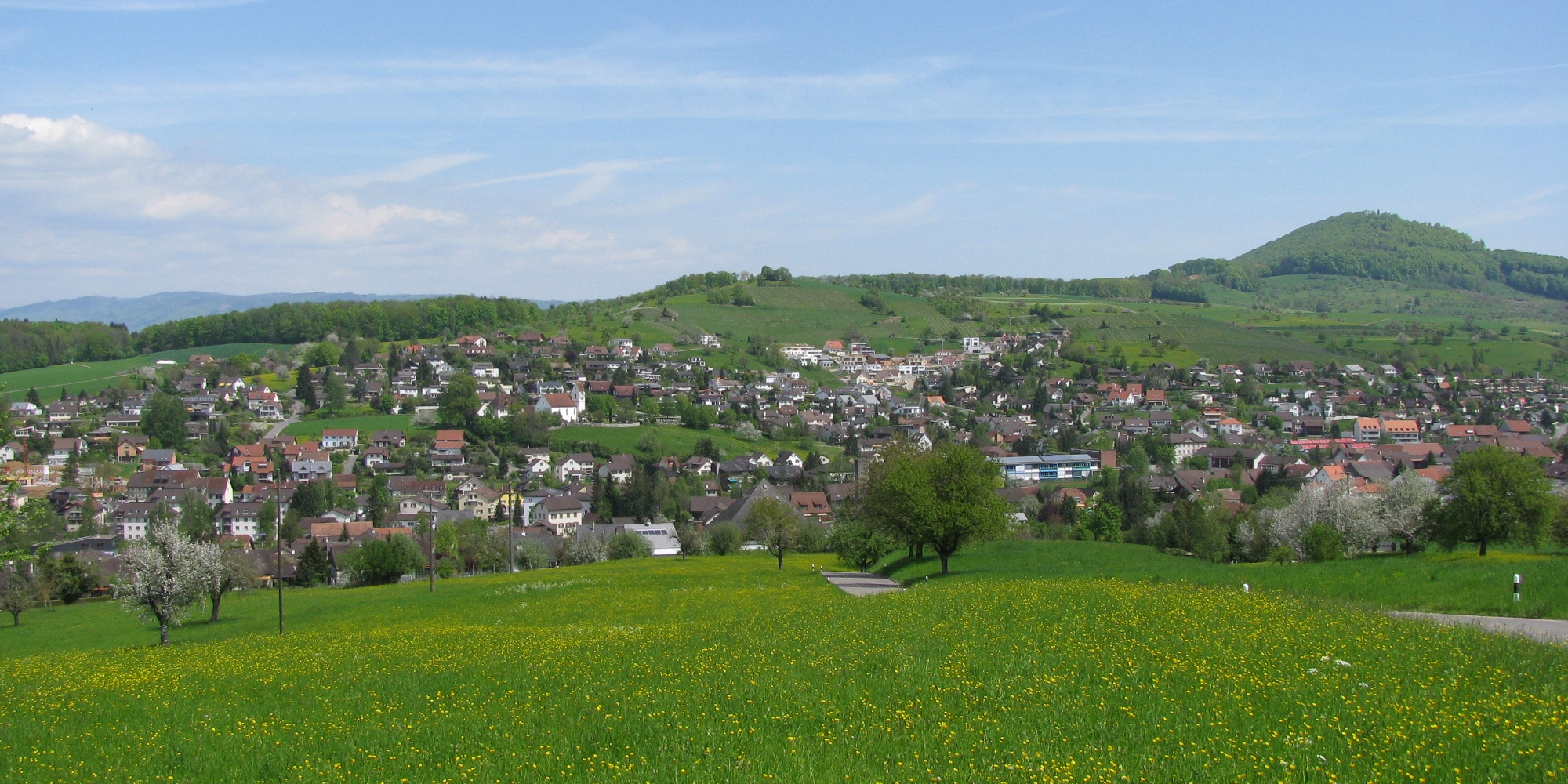
Magden

Aerial view (1953)

Magden has an area, as of 2009, of 11.01 square kilometers (4.25 sq mi). Of this area, 5.19 km^{2} (2.00 sq mi) or 47.1% is used for agricultural purposes, while 4.61 km^{2} (1.78 sq mi) or 41.9% is forested. Of the rest of the land, 1.21 km^{2} (0.47 sq mi) or 11.0% is settled (buildings or roads), 0.02 km^{2} (4.9 acres) or 0.2% is either rivers or lakes.

Of the built up area, housing and buildings made up 6.8% and transportation infrastructure made up 2.9%. Out of the forested land, 40.5% of the total land area is heavily forested and 1.4% is covered with orchards or small clusters of trees. Of the agricultural land, 18.3% is used for growing crops and 23.1% is pastures, while 5.7% is used for orchards or vine crops. All the water in the municipality is in rivers and streams.

The municipality is located in the Rheinfelden district, in the Fricktal. It consists of the haufendorf village (an irregular, unplanned and quite closely packed village, built around a central square) of Magden and the hamlets of Igligerhof and Deschlikon.

== Coat of arms ==
The blazon of the municipal coat of arms is Argent an Apple Tree Vert fructed Gules between two Vine Trees proper staked all issuant from a base of the second. The two grapevines commemorate the finding of the remains of old Roman vineyards in the village.

== Demographics ==
Magden has a population (as of December 2020) of 3,872. As of June 2009, 12.5% of the population are foreign nationals. Over the last 10 years (1997–2007) the population has changed at a rate of 18.4%. Most of the population (as of 2000) speaks German (92.9%), with French being second most common ( 1.5%) and English being third ( 1.4%).

The age distribution, as of 2008, in Magden is; 367 children or 10.4% of the population are between 0 and 9 years old and 473 teenagers or 13.5% are between 10 and 19. Of the adult population, 314 people or 8.9% of the population are between 20 and 29 years old. 421 people or 12.0% are between 30 and 39, 642 people or 18.3% are between 40 and 49, and 473 people or 13.5% are between 50 and 59. The senior population distribution is 453 people or 12.9% of the population are between 60 and 69 years old, 258 people or 7.3% are between 70 and 79, there are 97 people or 2.8% who are between 80 and 89, and there are 15 people or 0.4% who are 90 and older.

As of 2000 the average number of residents per living room was 0.55 which is about equal to the cantonal average of 0.57 per room. In this case, a room is defined as space of a housing unit of at least 4 m^{2} (43 sq ft) as normal bedrooms, dining rooms, living rooms, kitchens and habitable cellars and attics. About 71.8% of the total households were owner occupied, or in other words did not pay rent (though they may have a mortgage or a rent-to-own agreement).

As of 2000, there were 68 homes with 1 or 2 persons in the household, 494 homes with 3 or 4 persons in the household, and 588 homes with 5 or more persons in the household. As of 2000, there were 1,168 private households (homes and apartments) in the municipality, and an average of 2.6 persons per household. In 2008 there were 894 single family homes (or 63.1% of the total) out of a total of 1,416 homes and apartments. There were a total of 7 empty apartments for a 0.5% vacancy rate. As of 2007, the construction rate of new housing units was 13.2 new units per 1000 residents.

In the 2007 federal election the most popular party was the SVP which received 30.7% of the vote. The next three most popular parties were the SP (25.4%), the FDP (14.5%) and the CVP (13.9%).

The historical population is given in the following table:

Historical population
Year	Pop.	±%
1768	689	—
1850	1,075	+56.0%
1900	894	−16.8%
1950	975	+9.1%
1960	1,107	+13.5%
2000	3,043	+174.9%

== Heritage sites of national significance ==
The Paleolithic/Neolithic settlement at Strick is listed as a Swiss heritage site of national significance.

== Economy ==
As of 2007, Magden had an unemployment rate of 1.39%. As of 2005, there were 78 people employed in the primary economic sector and about 23 businesses involved in this sector. 190 people are employed in the secondary sector and there are 34 businesses in this sector. 318 people are employed in the tertiary sector, with 72 businesses in this sector.

In 2000 there were 1,481 workers who lived in the municipality. Of these, 1,169 or about 78.9% of the residents worked outside Magden while 232 people commuted into the municipality for work. There were a total of 544 jobs (of at least 6 hours per week) in the municipality. Of the working population, 19.2% used public transportation to get to work, and 54.1% used a private car.

== Religion ==
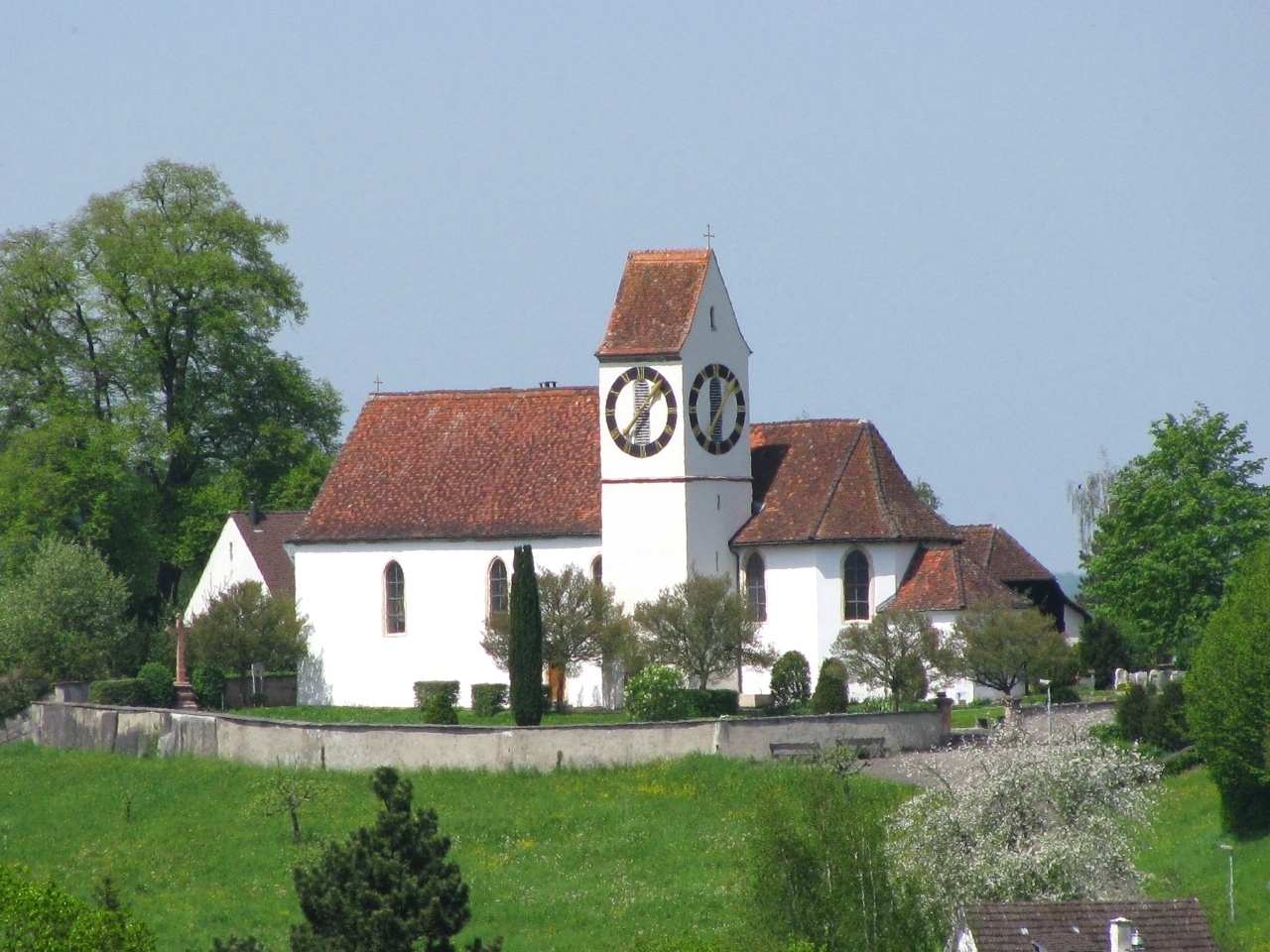
Magden's Christian Catholic church

From the 2000 census, 837 or 27.5% were Roman Catholic, while 1,219 or 40.1% belonged to the Swiss Reformed Church. Of the rest of the population, there were 393 individuals (or about 12.91% of the population) who belonged to the Christian Catholic faith.

== Education ==
In Magden about 85.4% of the population (between age 25-64) have completed either non-mandatory upper secondary education or additional higher education (either university or a Fachhochschule). Of the school age population (in the 2008/2009 school year), there are 281 students attending primary school, there are 125 students attending secondary school in the municipality.

Magden is home to the Mediathek Magden library. The library has (as of 2008) 10,025 books or other media, and loaned out 32,055 items in the same year. It was open a total of 184 days with average of 9 hours per week during that year.
