= Rothenfluh =

- Municipality
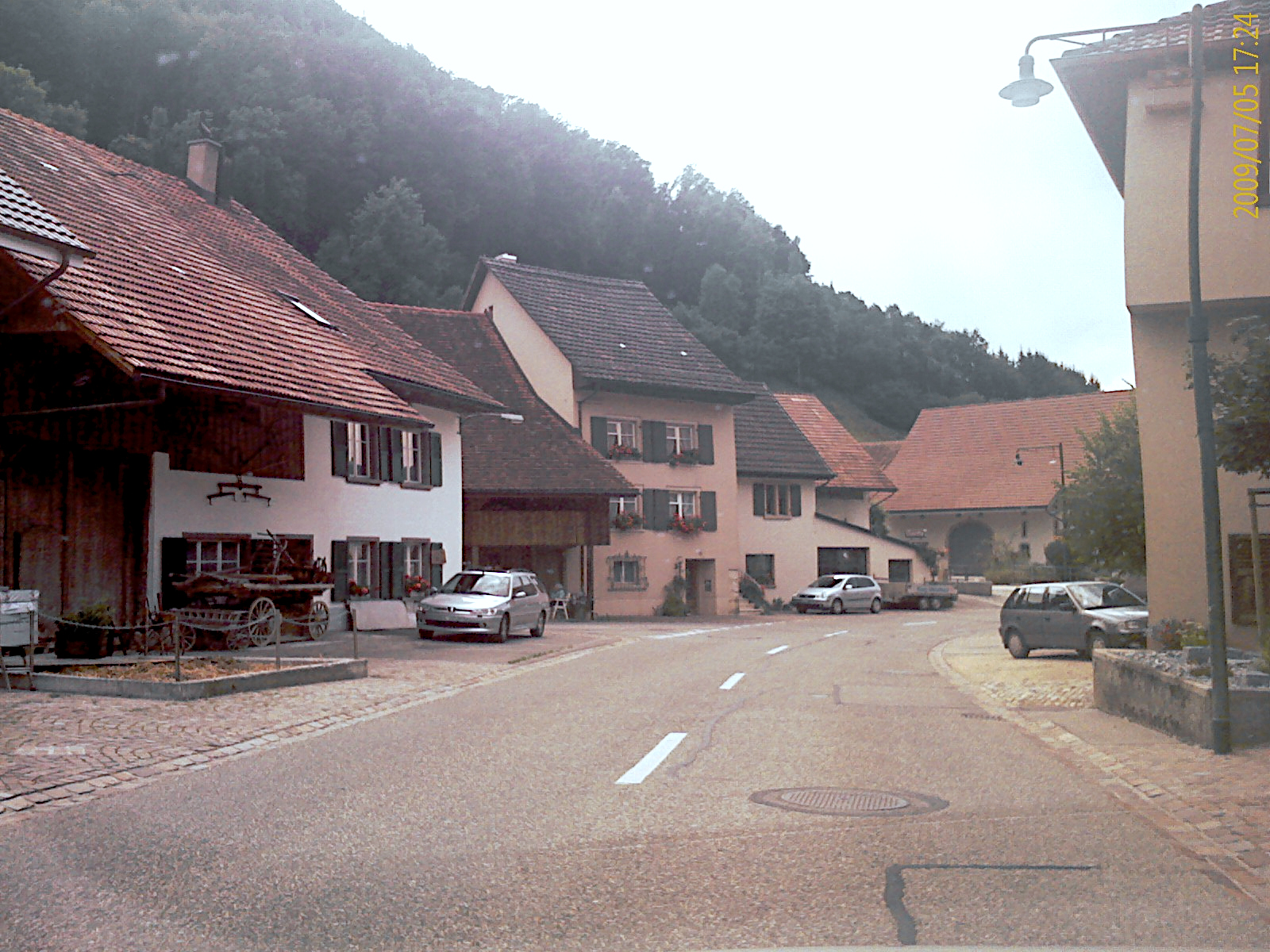

- Coat of arms
- Location of Rothenfluh
- Location within Switzerland Location within Canton of Basel-Landschaft
- Coordinates: 47°28′N 7°55′E
- Country: Switzerland
- Canton: Basel-Landschaft
- District: Sissach

Area
  - Total: 10.93 km^{2} (4.22 sq mi)
- Elevation: 471 m (1,545 ft)

Population (June 2021)
  - Total: 770
  - Density: 70/km^{2} (180/sq mi)
- Time zone: UTC+01:00 (CET)
  - Summer (DST): UTC+02:00 (CEST)
- Postal code: 4467
- SFOS number: 2858
- ISO 3166 code: CH-BL
- Surrounded by: Anwil, Hemmiken, Oltingen, Ormalingen, Wegenstetten (AG), Wenslingen, Wittnau (AG)
- Website: www.rothenfluh.ch

Rothenfluh is a municipality in the district of Sissach in the canton of Basel-Country in Switzerland.

== History ==
Rothenfluh is first mentioned in 1196 as Rotenfluo.

Rothenfluh is a conglomeration of seven medieval villages: Loglingen, Hendschikon, Söllickken, Werlickhen, Hohlwingen, Gastwingen, and Werdlingen. Most of the other medieval villages lost population, and Loglingen became the present village. In the 12th century, part of the territory of the municipality belonged to the Catholic Bishop of Basel, and part to the Habsburgs.

In the 16th century, the village became part of the Helvetic Confederation in the district of Gelterkinden. In 1803, it became a municipality of the district of Sissach.

Originally, there were two Catholic parishes, St. Stephan and St. Georg. The two parishes were united in the 13th century.

== Geography ==
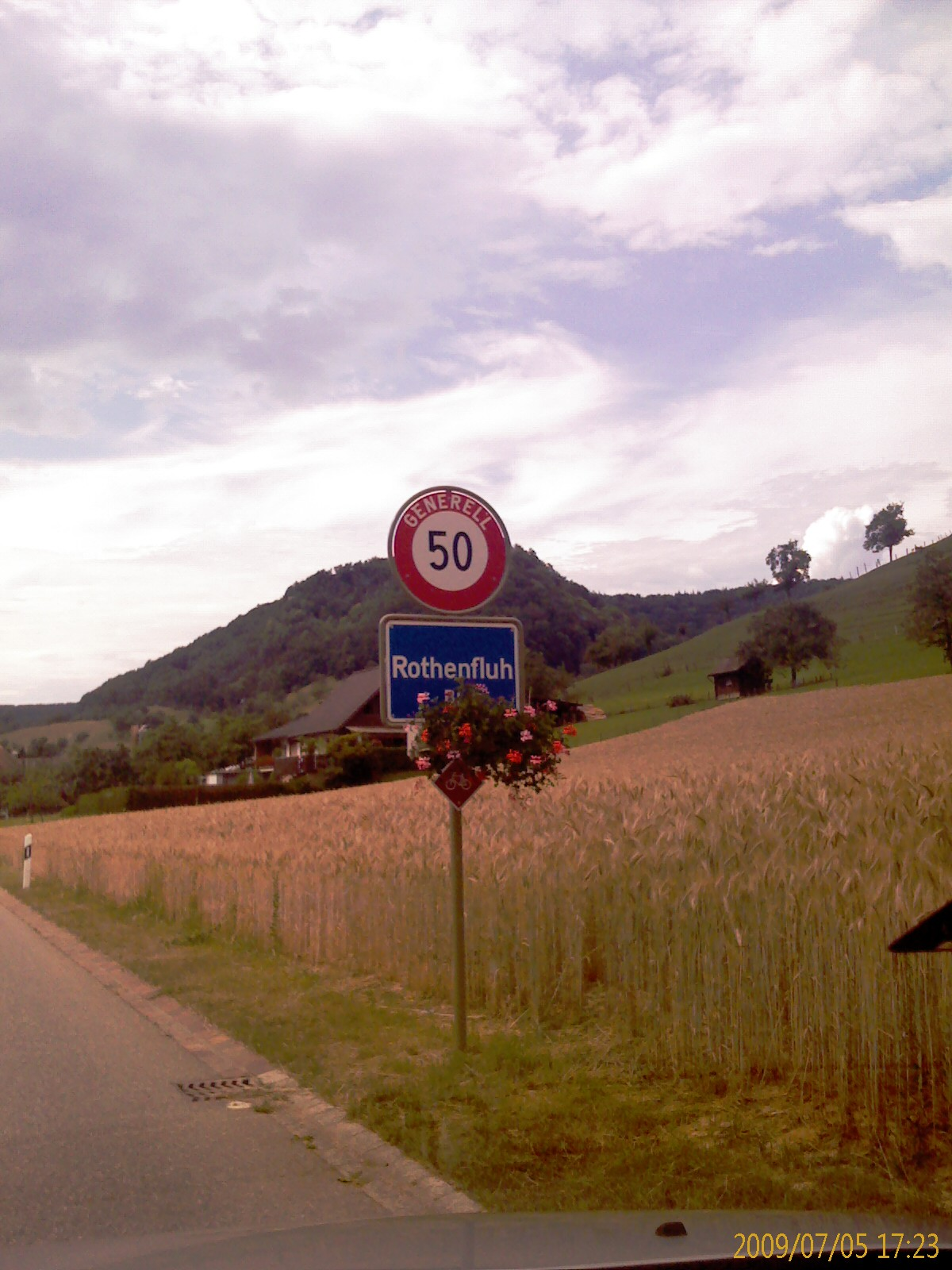
Entrance to the village

Aerial view (1950)

Rothenfluh has an area, as of 2009, of 10.93 square kilometers (4.22 sq mi). Of this area, 4.35 km^{2} (1.68 sq mi) or 39.8% is used for agricultural purposes, while 6.1 km^{2} (2.4 sq mi) or 55.8% is forested. Of the rest of the land, 0.42 km^{2} (0.16 sq mi) or 3.8% is settled (buildings or roads) and 0.01 km^{2} (2.5 acres) or 0.1% is unproductive land.

Of the built up area, housing and buildings made up 1.9% and transportation infrastructure made up 1.5%. Out of the forested land, 53.9% of the total land area is heavily forested and 1.9% is covered with orchards or small clusters of trees. Of the agricultural land, 11.3% is used for growing crops and 25.1% is pastures, while 3.4% is used for orchards or vine crops.

The municipality is located in the Sissach district. It is a ring shaped village at the confluence of the Ergolz and Dübach rivers.

== Coat of arms ==
The blazon of the municipal coat of arms is Or, a Monolith Gules between two Pine trees Vert issuant from Coupeaux of the same.

== Demographics ==
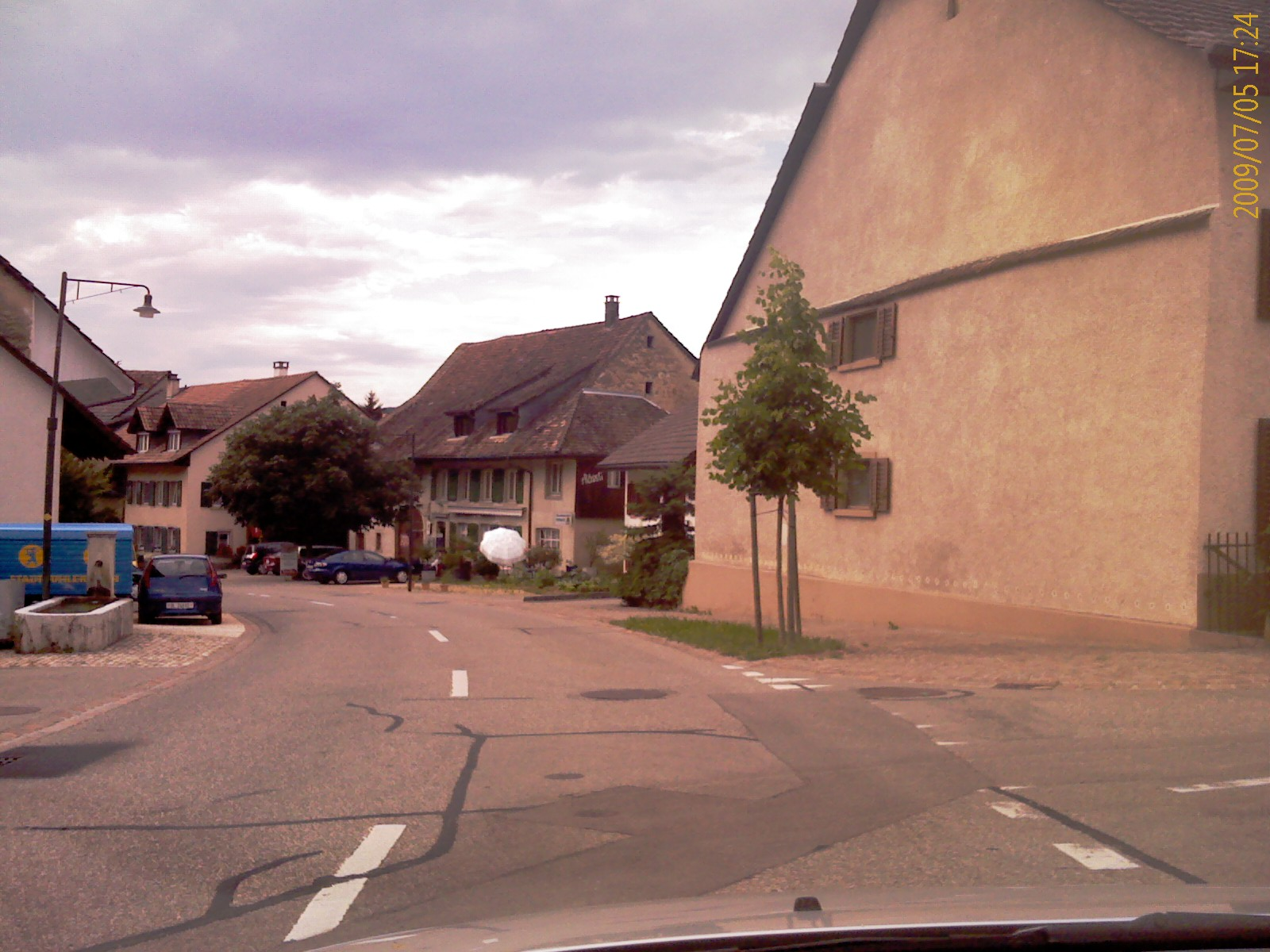
Rothenfluh

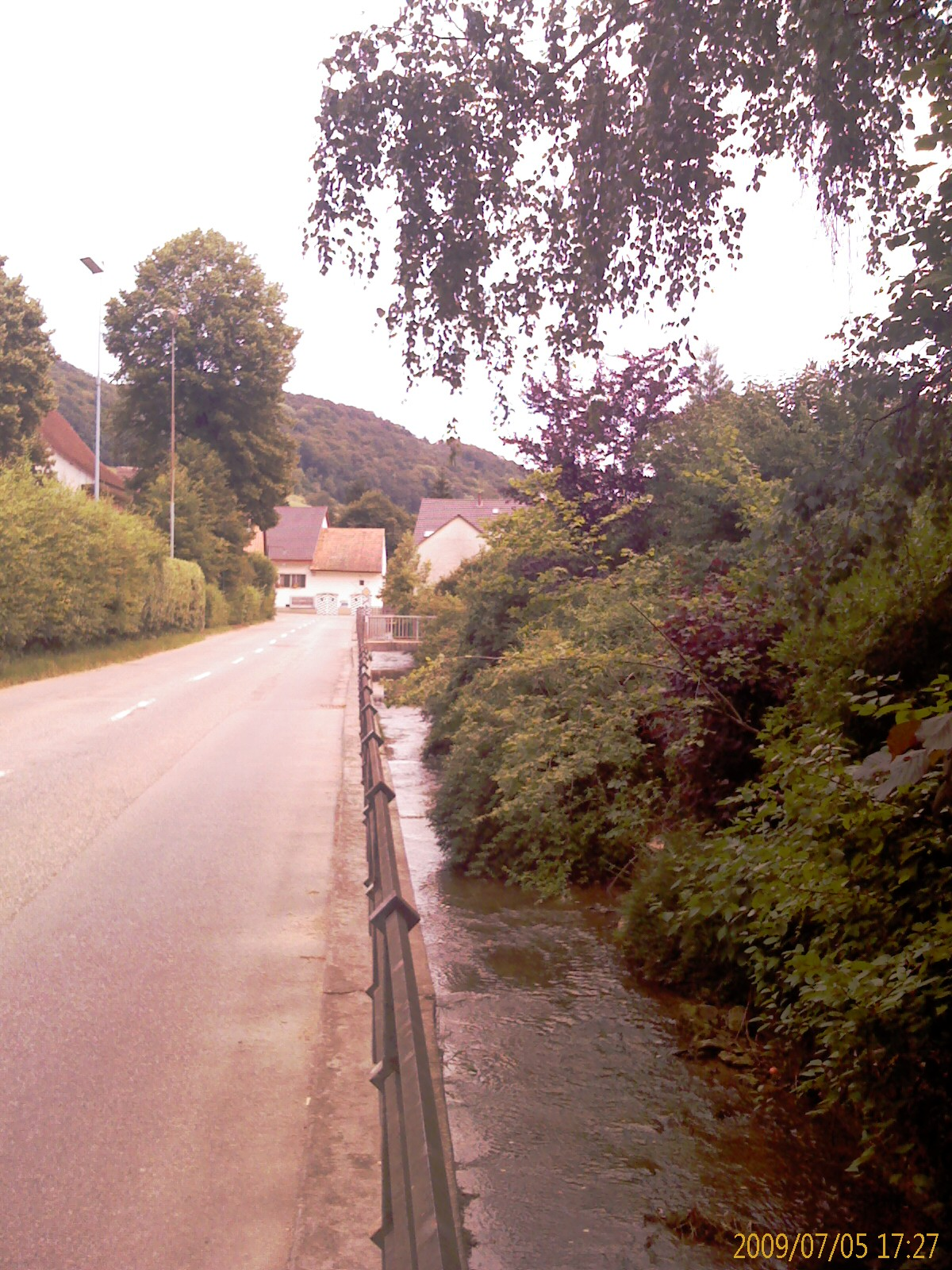
Ergolz river in Rothenfluh

Rothenfluh has a population (as of June 2021) of 770. As of 2008, 7.1% of the population are resident foreign nationals. Over the last 10 years (1997–2007) the population has changed at a rate of 7.8%.

Most of the population (as of 2000) speaks German (657 or 94.9%), with French being second most common (8 or 1.2%) and Italian language being third (6 or 0.9%).

As of 2008, the gender distribution of the population was 47.9% male and 52.1% female. The population was made up of 701 Swiss citizens (91.5% of the population), and 65 non-Swiss residents (8.5%) Of the population in the municipality 297 or about 42.9% were born in Rothenfluh and lived there in 2000. There were 147 or 21.2% who were born in the same canton, while 163 or 23.6% were born somewhere else in Switzerland, and 67 or 9.7% were born outside of Switzerland.

In 2008 there were 6 live births to Swiss citizens and 1 birth to non-Swiss citizens, and in same time span there were 9 deaths of Swiss citizens. Ignoring immigration and emigration, the population of Swiss citizens decreased by 3 while the foreign population increased by 1. There was 1 Swiss man who immigrated back to Switzerland and 1 Swiss woman who emigrated from Switzerland. At the same time, there was 1 non-Swiss woman who immigrated from another country to Switzerland. The total Swiss population change in 2008 (from all sources, including moves across municipal borders) was an increase of 22 and the non-Swiss population increased by 5 people. This represents a population growth rate of 3.7%.

The age distribution, as of 2010, in Rothenfluh is; 47 children or 6.1% of the population are between 0 and 6 years old and 124 teenagers or 16.2% are between 7 and 19. Of the adult population, 95 people or 12.4% of the population are between 20 and 29 years old. 93 people or 12.1% are between 30 and 39, 148 people or 19.3% are between 40 and 49, and 139 people or 18.1% are between 50 and 64. The senior population distribution is 73 people or 9.5% of the population are between 65 and 79 years old and there are 47 people or 6.1% who are over 80.

As of 2000, there were 292 people who were single and never married in the municipality. There were 333 married individuals, 41 widows or widowers and 26 individuals who are divorced.

As of 2000, there were 256 private households in the municipality, and an average of 2.7 persons per household. There were 61 households that consist of only one person and 30 households with five or more people. Out of a total of 260 households that answered this question, 23.5% were households made up of just one person and 5 were adults who lived with their parents. Of the rest of the households, there are 77 married couples without children, 102 married couples with children There were 8 single parents with a child or children. There were 3 households that were made up unrelated people and 4 households that were made some sort of institution or another collective housing.

In 2000 there were 93 single family homes (or 48.2% of the total) out of a total of 193 inhabited buildings. There were 30 multi-family buildings (15.5%), along with 61 multi-purpose buildings that were mostly used for housing (31.6%) and 9 other use buildings (commercial or industrial) that also had some housing (4.7%). Of the single family homes 21 were built before 1919, while 23 were built between 1990 and 2000.

In 2000 there were 276 apartments in the municipality. The most common apartment size was 4 rooms of which there were 79. There were 4 single room apartments and 106 apartments with five or more rooms. Of these apartments, a total of 248 apartments (89.9% of the total) were permanently occupied, while 17 apartments (6.2%) were seasonally occupied and 11 apartments (4.0%) were empty. As of 2007, the construction rate of new housing units was 4.2 new units per 1000 residents. As of 2000 the average price to rent a two-room apartment was about 617.00 CHF (US$490, £280, €390), a three-room apartment was about 823.00 CHF (US$660, £370, €530) and a four-room apartment cost an average of 1168.00 CHF (US$930, £530, €750). The vacancy rate for the municipality, in 2008, was 0%.

The historical population is given in the following chart:

== Sights ==
The entire village of Rothenfluh is designated as part of the Inventory of Swiss Heritage Sites.

== Politics ==
In the 2007 federal election the most popular party was the SVP which received 35.54% of the vote. The next three most popular parties were the SP (21.4%), the Green Party (18.96%) and the FDP (13.98%). In the federal election, a total of 267 votes were cast, and the voter turnout was 49.3%.

== Economy ==
As of 2007, Rothenfluh had an unemployment rate of 1.55%. As of 2005, there were 63 people employed in the primary economic sector and about 21 businesses involved in this sector. 37 people were employed in the secondary sector and there were 7 businesses in this sector. 64 people were employed in the tertiary sector, with 20 businesses in this sector. There were 339 residents of the municipality who were employed in some capacity, of which females made up 39.8% of the workforce.

In 2008 the total number of full-time equivalent jobs was 111. The number of jobs in the primary sector was 33, of which 28 were in agriculture and 5 were in forestry or lumber production. The number of jobs in the secondary sector was 46, of which 16 or (34.8%) were in manufacturing and 31 (67.4%) were in construction. The number of jobs in the tertiary sector was 32. In the tertiary sector; 1 was in the sale or repair of motor vehicles, 2 or 6.3% were in the movement and storage of goods, 10 or 31.3% were in a hotel or restaurant, 1 was in the information industry, 2 or 6.3% were technical professionals or scientists, 4 or 12.5% were in education and 4 or 12.5% were in health care.

In 2000, there were 37 workers who commuted into the municipality and 240 workers who commuted away. The municipality is a net exporter of workers, with about 6.5 workers leaving the municipality for every one entering. Of the working population, 18.3% used public transportation to get to work, and 44.2% used a private car.

== Religion ==
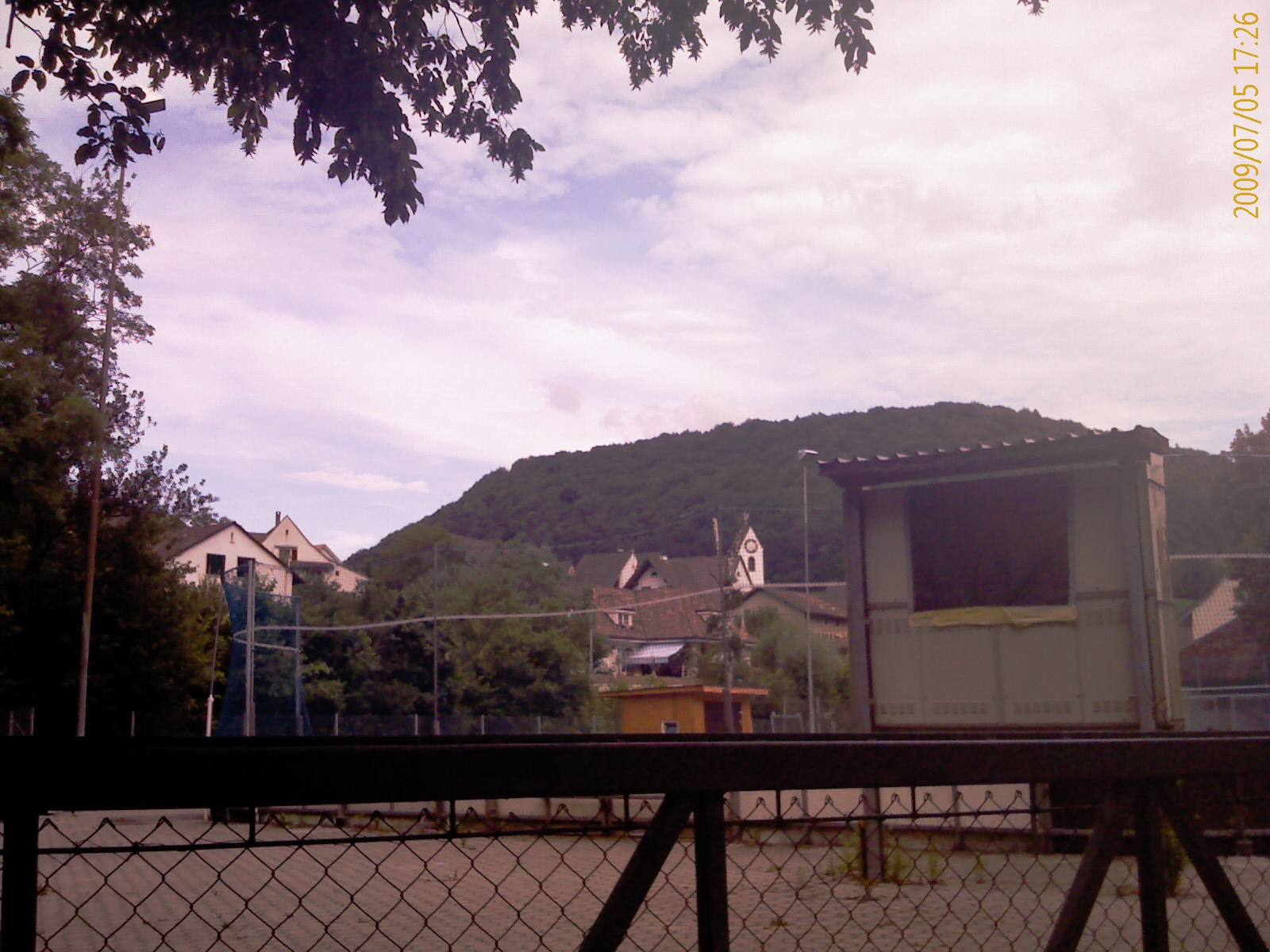
Rothenfluh with the village church in the background

From the 2000 census, 75 or 10.8% were Roman Catholic, while 502 or 72.5% belonged to the Swiss Reformed Church. Of the rest of the population, and there were 20 individuals (or about 2.89% of the population) who belonged to another Christian church. There were 7 (or about 1.01% of the population) who were Islamic. There was 1 person who was Buddhist, 1 person who was Hindu and 1 individual who belonged to another church. 70 (or about 10.12% of the population) belonged to no church, are agnostic or atheist, and 15 individuals (or about 2.17% of the population) did not answer the question.

== Education ==
In Rothenfluh about 264 or (38.2%) of the population have completed non-mandatory upper secondary education, and 77 or (11.1%) have completed additional higher education (either university or a Fachhochschule). Of the 77 who completed tertiary schooling, 63.6% were Swiss men, 22.1% were Swiss women, 7.8% were non-Swiss men and 6.5% were non-Swiss women.

As of 2000, there were 65 students from Rothenfluh who attended schools outside the municipality.
