= Wintersingen =

- Municipality
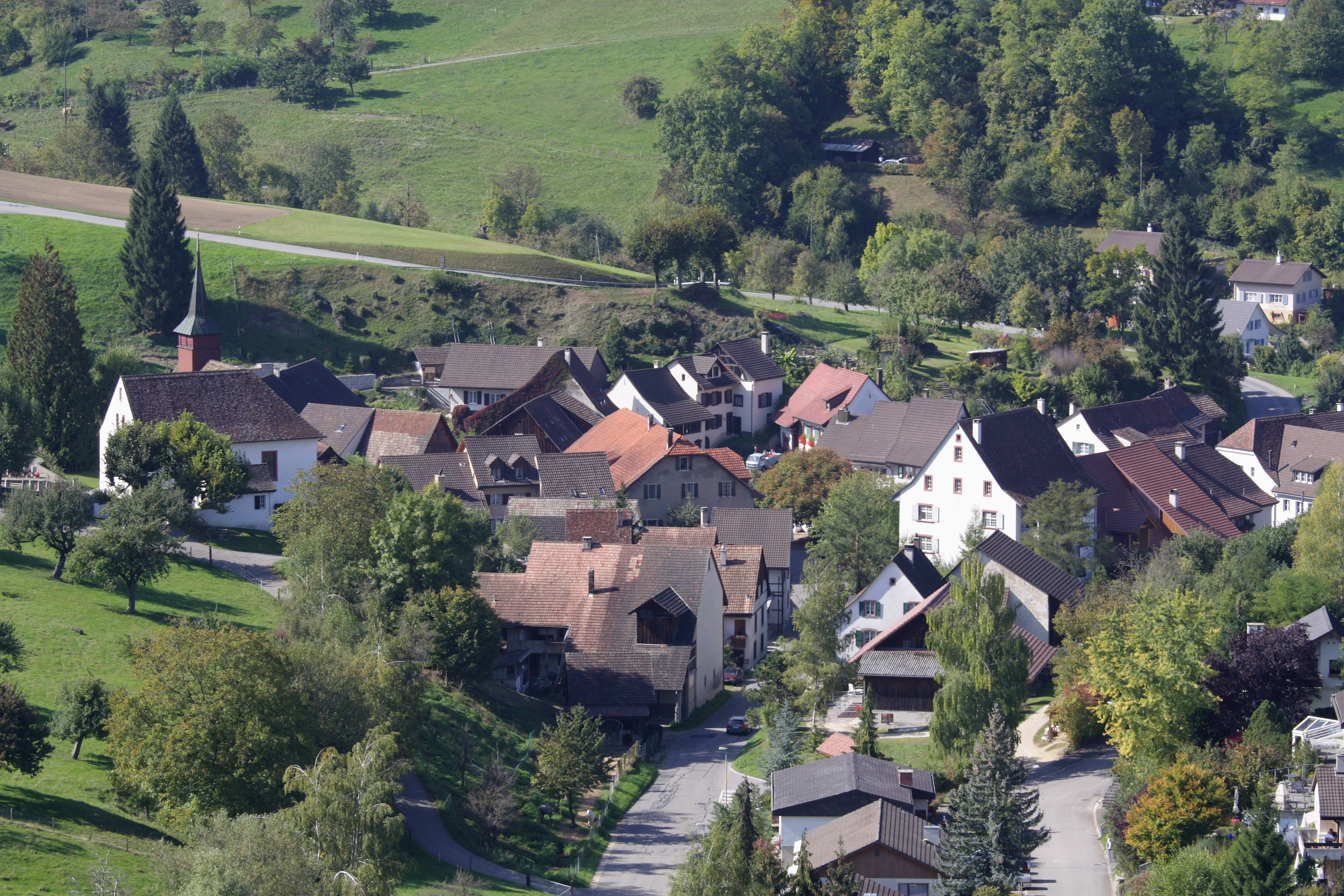

- Coat of arms
- Location of Wintersingen
- Location within Switzerland Location within Canton of Basel-Landschaft
- Coordinates: 47°30′N 7°49′E
- Country: Switzerland
- Canton: Basel-Landschaft
- District: Sissach

Area
  - Total: 6.95 km^{2} (2.68 sq mi)
- Elevation: 430 m (1,410 ft)

Population (June 2021)
  - Total: 637
  - Density: 91.7/km^{2} (237/sq mi)
- Time zone: UTC+01:00 (CET)
  - Summer (DST): UTC+02:00 (CEST)
- Postal code: 4451
- SFOS number: 2866
- ISO 3166 code: CH-BL
- Surrounded by: Buus, Magden (AG), Maisprach, Nusshof, Rickenbach, Sissach
- Website: www.wintersingen.ch

Wintersingen is a municipality in the district of Sissach in the canton of Basel-Country in Switzerland.

== Geography ==
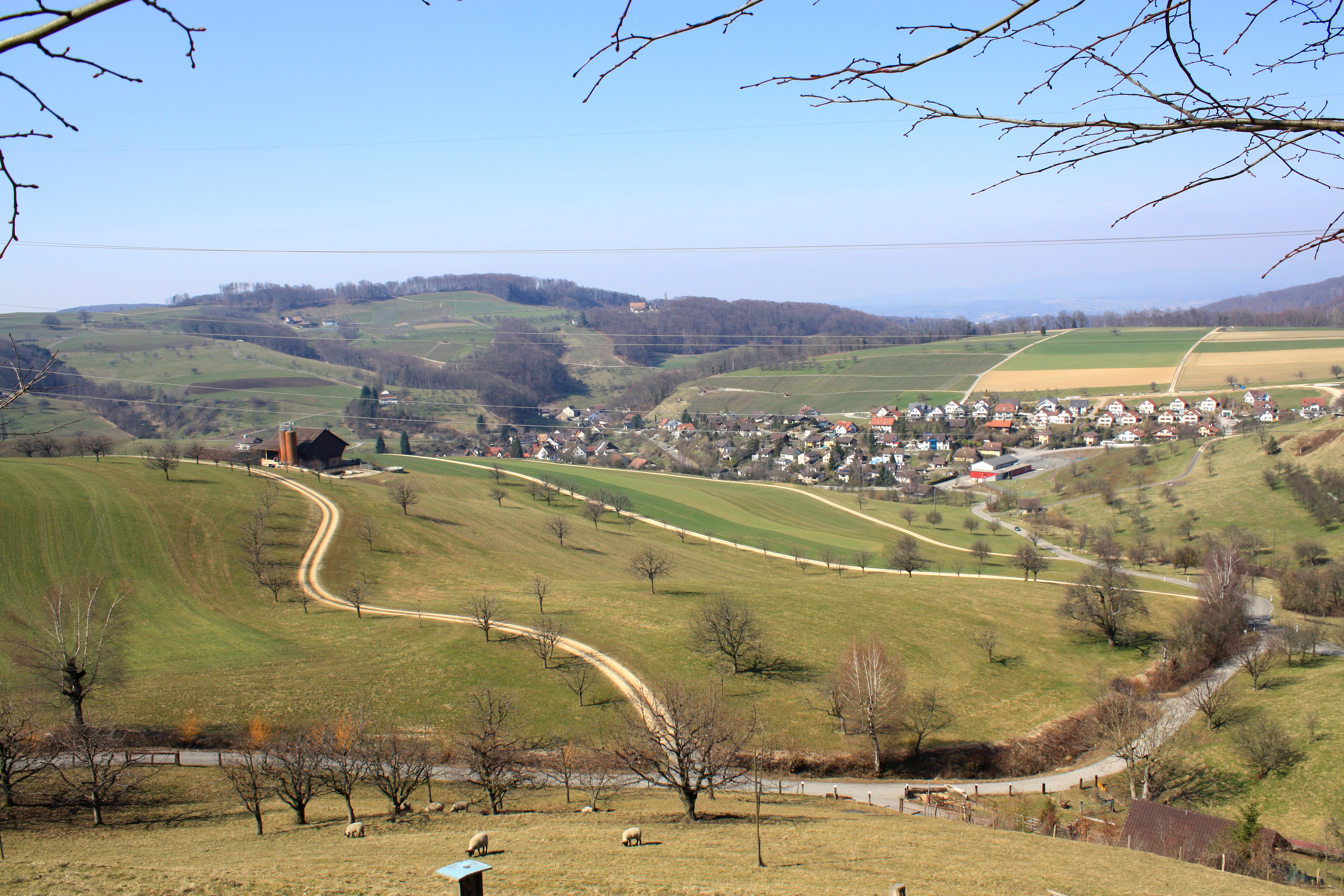
Wintersingen

Wintersingen has an area, as of 2009, of 6.95 square kilometers (2.68 sq mi). Of this area, 4 km^{2} (1.5 sq mi) or 57.6% is used for agricultural purposes, while 2.4 km^{2} (0.93 sq mi) or 34.5% is forested. Of the rest of the land, 0.48 km^{2} (0.19 sq mi) or 6.9% is settled (buildings or roads), 0.01 km^{2} (2.5 acres) or 0.1% is either rivers or lakes and 0.03 km^{2} (7.4 acres) or 0.4% is unproductive land.

Of the built up area, housing and buildings made up 3.6% and transportation infrastructure made up 2.6%. Out of the forested land, 31.7% of the total land area is heavily forested and 2.9% is covered with orchards or small clusters of trees. Of the agricultural land, 15.7% is used for growing crops and 32.7% is pastures, while 9.2% is used for orchards or vine crops. All the water in the municipality is flowing water.

== Coat of arms ==
The blazon of the municipal coat of arms is Gules, three Arrows bendwise Argent.

== Demographics ==
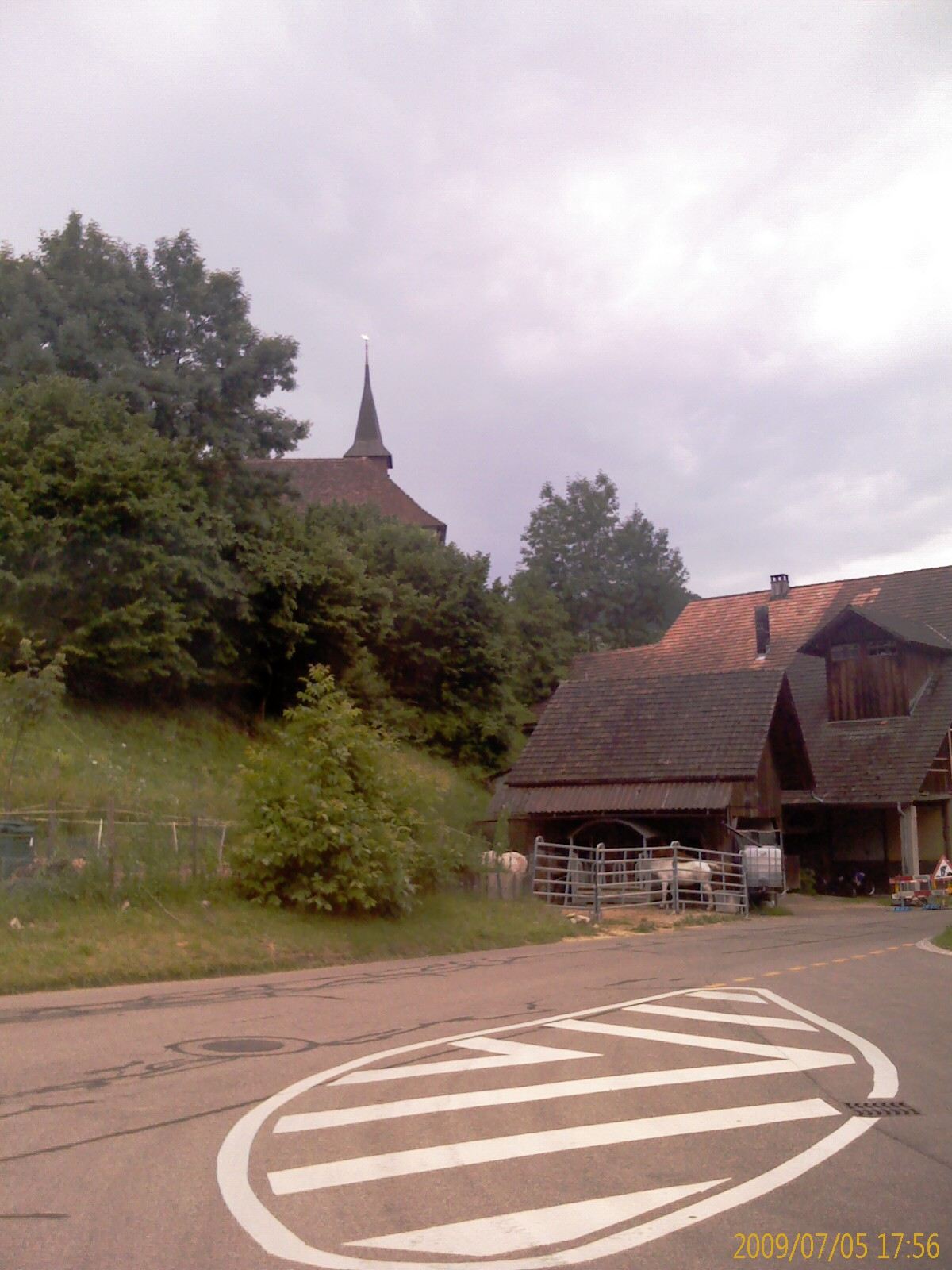
Church and houses in Wintersingen

Wintersingen has a population (as of June 2021) of 637. As of 2008, 5.7% of the population are resident foreign nationals. Over the last 10 years (1997–2007) the population has changed at a rate of 0.8%.

Most of the population (as of 2000) speaks German (564 or 95.9%), with Albanian being second most common (10 or 1.7%) and French being third (5 or 0.9%).

As of 2008, the gender distribution of the population was 48.8% male and 51.2% female. The population was made up of 576 Swiss citizens (93.4% of the population), and 41 non-Swiss residents (6.6%) Of the population in the municipality 250 or about 42.5% were born in Wintersingen and lived there in 2000. There were 134 or 22.8% who were born in the same canton, while 154 or 26.2% were born somewhere else in Switzerland, and 48 or 8.2% were born outside of Switzerland.

In 2008 there were 2 live births to Swiss citizens and were 2 deaths of Swiss citizens. Ignoring immigration and emigration, the population of Swiss citizens remained the same while the foreign population remained the same. There was 1 Swiss man who emigrated from Switzerland. At the same time, there xxx were 1 non-Swiss woman who immigrated from another country to Switzerland. The total Swiss population change in 2008 (from all sources, including moves across municipal borders) was a decrease of 12 and the non-Swiss population increased by 8 people. This represents a population growth rate of -0.7%.

The age distribution, as of 2010, in Wintersingen is; 23 children or 3.7% of the population are between 0 and 6 years old and 113 teenagers or 18.3% are between 7 and 19. Of the adult population, 62 people or 10.0% of the population are between 20 and 29 years old. 63 people or 10.2% are between 30 and 39, 113 people or 18.3% are between 40 and 49, and 153 people or 24.8% are between 50 and 64. The senior population distribution is 56 people or 9.1% of the population are between 65 and 79 years old and there are 34 people or 5.5% who are over 80.

As of 2000, there were 237 people who were single and never married in the municipality. There were 298 married individuals, 27 widows or widowers and 26 individuals who are divorced.

As of 2000, there were 234 private households in the municipality, and an average of 2.5 persons per household. There were 54 households that consist of only one person and 19 households with five or more people. Out of a total of 235 households that answered this question, 23.0% were households made up of just one person and 2 were adults who lived with their parents. Of the rest of the households, there are 87 married couples without children, 79 married couples with children There were 7 single parents with a child or children. There were 5 households that were made up unrelated people and 1 household that was made some sort of institution or another collective housing.

In 2000 there were 130 single family homes (or 65.7% of the total) out of a total of 198 inhabited buildings. There were 21 multi-family buildings (10.6%), along with 43 multi-purpose buildings that were mostly used for housing (21.7%) and 4 other use buildings (commercial or industrial) that also had some housing (2.0%). Of the single family homes 39 were built before 1919, while 31 were built between 1990 and 2000.

In 2000 there were 248 apartments in the municipality. The most common apartment size was 4 rooms of which there were 74. There were 4 single room apartments and 113 apartments with five or more rooms. Of these apartments, a total of 229 apartments (92.3% of the total) were permanently occupied, while 8 apartments (3.2%) were seasonally occupied and 11 apartments (4.4%) were empty. As of 2009, the construction rate of new housing units was 0 new units per 1000 residents. As of 2000 the average price to rent three room apartment was about 877.00 CHF (US$700, £390, €560) and a four-room apartment cost an average of 1179.00 CHF (US$940, £530, €750). The vacancy rate for the municipality, in 2010, was 0%.

The historical population is given in the following chart:

== Sights ==
The entire village of Wintersingen is designated as part of the Inventory of Swiss Heritage Sites.

== Politics ==
In the 2007 federal election the most popular party was the SVP which received 39.08% of the vote. The next three most popular parties were the FDP (19.08%), the Green Party (18.55%) and the SP (14.51%). In the federal election, a total of 252 votes were cast, and the voter turnout was 52.9%.

== Economy ==
As of 2010, Wintersingen had an unemployment rate of 1.5%. As of 2008, there were 37 people employed in the primary economic sector and about 14 businesses involved in this sector. 22 people were employed in the secondary sector and there were 7 businesses in this sector. 57 people were employed in the tertiary sector, with 17 businesses in this sector. There were 310 residents of the municipality who were employed in some capacity, of which females made up 41.6% of the workforce.

In 2008 the total number of full-time equivalent jobs was 86. The number of jobs in the primary sector was 27, all of which were in agriculture. The number of jobs in the secondary sector was 21, of which 17 or (81.0%) were in manufacturing and 4 (19.0%) were in construction. The number of jobs in the tertiary sector was 38. In the tertiary sector; 1 or 2.6% were in wholesale or retail sales or the repair of motor vehicles, 12 or 31.6% were in the movement and storage of goods, 1 or 2.6% were in a hotel or restaurant, 2 or 5.3% were in the information industry, 10 or 26.3% were technical professionals or scientists, 4 or 10.5% were in education and 4 or 10.5% were in health care.

In 2000, there were 26 workers who commuted into the municipality and 243 workers who commuted away. The municipality is a net exporter of workers, with about 9.3 workers leaving the municipality for every one entering. Of the working population, 12.3% used public transportation to get to work, and 66.1% used a private car.

== Religion ==
From the 2000 census, 64 or 10.9% were Roman Catholic, while 425 or 72.3% belonged to the Swiss Reformed Church. Of the rest of the population, there were 2 members of an Orthodox church (or about 0.34% of the population), there were 4 individuals (or about 0.68% of the population) who belonged to the Christian Catholic Church, and there were 3 individuals (or about 0.51% of the population) who belonged to another Christian church. There were 11 (or about 1.87% of the population) who were Islamic. There was 1 person who was Buddhist and 1 individual who belonged to another church. 75 (or about 12.76% of the population) belonged to no church, are agnostic or atheist, and 2 individuals (or about 0.34% of the population) did not answer the question.

== Education ==
In Wintersingen about 262 or (44.6%) of the population have completed non-mandatory upper secondary education, and 81 or (13.8%) have completed additional higher education (either university or a Fachhochschule). Of the 81 who completed tertiary schooling, 67.9% were Swiss men, 25.9% were Swiss women.

As of 2000, there were 5 students in Wintersingen who came from another municipality, while 37 residents attended schools outside the municipality.
