= Hemmiken =

- Municipality
- Coat of arms
- Location of Hemmiken
- Location within Switzerland Location within Canton of Basel-Landschaft
- Coordinates: 47°29′N 7°54′E
- Country: Switzerland
- Canton: Basel-Landschaft
- District: Sissach

Area
  - Total: 3.39 km^{2} (1.31 sq mi)
- Elevation: 497 m (1,631 ft)

Population (June 2021)
  - Total: 266
  - Density: 78.5/km^{2} (203/sq mi)
- Time zone: UTC+01:00 (CET)
  - Summer (DST): UTC+02:00 (CEST)
- Postal code: 4465
- SFOS number: 2848
- ISO 3166 code: CH-BL
- Surrounded by: Buus, Hellikon (AG), Ormalingen, Rothenfluh, Wegenstetten (AG)
- Website: https://www.hemmiken.ch SFSO statistics

Hemmiken is a municipality in the district of Sissach in the canton of Basel-Country in Switzerland.

== History ==
Hemmiken is first mentioned in 1255 as Enninchon.

== Geography ==
Aerial view (1958)

Hemmiken has an area, as of 2009, of 3.39 square kilometers (1.31 sq mi). Of this area, 2.38 km^{2} (0.92 sq mi) or 70.2% is used for agricultural purposes, while 0.86 km^{2} (0.33 sq mi) or 25.4% is forested. Of the rest of the land, 0.19 km^{2} (0.073 sq mi) or 5.6% is settled (buildings or roads).

Of the built up area, housing and buildings made up 2.9% and transportation infrastructure made up 2.4%. Out of the forested land, 22.7% of the total land area is heavily forested and 2.7% is covered with orchards or small clusters of trees. Of the agricultural land, 19.8% is used for growing crops and 43.4% is pastures, while 7.1% is used for orchards or vine crops.

The municipality is located in the Sissach district, on the right side of a smaller valley off the Ergolz valley. It consists of the linear village of Hemmiken.

== Coat of arms ==
The blazon of the municipal coat of arms is Or, three crossed stone-cutters tools Azure.

== Demographics ==
Hemmiken has a population (as of June 2021) of 266. As of 2008, 2.6% of the population are resident foreign nationals. Over the last 10 years (1997–2007) the population has changed at a rate of -1.8%.

Most of the population (as of 2000) speaks German (279 or 96.2%), with Albanian being second most common (5 or 1.7%) and English being third (3 or 1.0%).

As of 2008, the gender distribution of the population was 52.0% male and 48.0% female. The population was made up of 266 Swiss citizens (96.0% of the population), and 11 non-Swiss residents (4.0%) Of the population in the municipality 128 or about 44.1% were born in Hemmiken and lived there in 2000. There were 77 or 26.6% who were born in the same canton, while 59 or 20.3% were born somewhere else in Switzerland, and 25 or 8.6% were born outside of Switzerland. In 2008 there was 1 live birth to Swiss citizens and were 3 deaths of Swiss citizens. Ignoring immigration and emigration, the population of Swiss citizens decreased by 2 while the foreign population remained the same. There . At the same time, there was 1 non-Swiss woman who immigrated from another country to Switzerland. The total Swiss population change in 2008 (from all sources, including moves across municipal borders) was an increase of 3 and the non-Swiss population increased by 1 people. This represents a population growth rate of 1.5%.

The age distribution, as of 2010, in Hemmiken is; 13 children or 4.7% of the population are between 0 and 6 years old and 36 teenagers or 13.0% are between 7 and 19. Of the adult population, 27 people or 9.7% of the population are between 20 and 29 years old. 39 people or 14.1% are between 30 and 39, 46 people or 16.6% are between 40 and 49, and 61 people or 22.0% are between 50 and 64. The senior population distribution is 37 people or 13.4% of the population are between 65 and 79 years old and there are 18 people or 6.5% who are over 80.

As of 2000, there were 105 people who were single and never married in the municipality. There were 157 married individuals, 19 widows or widowers and 9 individuals who are divorced.

As of 2000, there were 123 private households in the municipality, and an average of 2.3 persons per household. There were 36 households that consist of only one person and 8 households with five or more people. Out of a total of 125 households that answered this question, 28.8% were households made up of just one person and 1 was made up of an adult who lived with their parents. Of the rest of the households, there are 39 married couples without children, 42 married couples with children There were 5 single parents with a child or children.

In 2000 there were 40 single family homes (or 50.0% of the total) out of a total of 80 inhabited buildings. There were 10 multi-family buildings (12.5%), along with 28 multi-purpose buildings that were mostly used for housing (35.0%) and 2 other use buildings (commercial or industrial) that also had some housing (2.5%). Of the single family homes 12 were built before 1919, while 5 were built between 1990 and 2000.

In 2000 there were 128 apartments in the municipality. The most common apartment size was 4 rooms of which there were 37. There were 3 single room apartments and 46 apartments with five or more rooms. Of these apartments, a total of 122 apartments (95.3% of the total) were permanently occupied, while apartments (0.0%) were seasonally occupied and 6 apartments (4.7%) were empty. As of 2007, the construction rate of new housing units was 3.7 new units per 1000 residents. As of 2000 the average price to rent a two-room apartment was about .00 CHF (US$0, £0, €0), a three-room apartment was about .00 CHF (US$0, £0, €0) and a four-room apartment cost an average of 1274.00 CHF (US$1020, £570, €820). The vacancy rate for the municipality, in 2008, was 0%.

The historical population is given in the following chart:

== Politics ==
In the 2007 federal election the most popular party was the SVP which received 53.86% of the vote. The next three most popular parties were the Green Party (14.52%), the SP (14.27%) and the FDP (10.93%). In the federal election, a total of 112 votes were cast, and the voter turnout was 50.0%.

== Economy ==
As of 2007, Hemmiken had an unemployment rate of 0.72%. As of 2005, there were 32 people employed in the primary economic sector and about 11 businesses involved in this sector. 2 people were employed in the secondary sector and there were 2 businesses in this sector. 13 people were employed in the tertiary sector, with 6 businesses in this sector. There were 161 residents of the municipality who were employed in some capacity, of which females made up 41.0% of the workforce.

In 2008 the total number of full-time equivalent jobs was 30. The number of jobs in the primary sector was 21, all of which were in agriculture. The number of jobs in the secondary sector was 3, of which 1 or (33.3%) were in manufacturing and 2 (66.7%) were in construction. The number of jobs in the tertiary sector was 6. In the tertiary sector; 3 or 50.0% were in a hotel or restaurant and 2 or 33.3% were in education.

In 2000, there were 3 workers who commuted into the municipality and 124 workers who commuted away. The municipality is a net exporter of workers, with about 41.3 workers leaving the municipality for every one entering. Of the working population, 21.7% used public transportation to get to work, and 50.9% used a private car.

== Religion ==
From the 2000 census, 46 or 15.9% were Roman Catholic, while 205 or 70.7% belonged to the Swiss Reformed Church. Of the rest of the population, there were 6 individuals (or about 2.07% of the population) who belonged to the Christian Catholic Church, and there was 1 individual who belongs to another Christian church. There were 5 (or about 1.72% of the population) who were Islamic. 27 (or about 9.31% of the population) belonged to no church, are agnostic or atheist.

== Education ==
In Hemmiken about 125 or (43.1%) of the population have completed non-mandatory upper secondary education, and 32 or (11.0%) have completed additional higher education (either university or a Fachhochschule). Of the 32 who completed tertiary schooling, 56.3% were Swiss men, 31.3% were Swiss women.

As of 2000, there were 2 students in Hemmiken who came from another municipality, while 15 residents attended schools outside the municipality.
