= Maisprach =

- Municipality
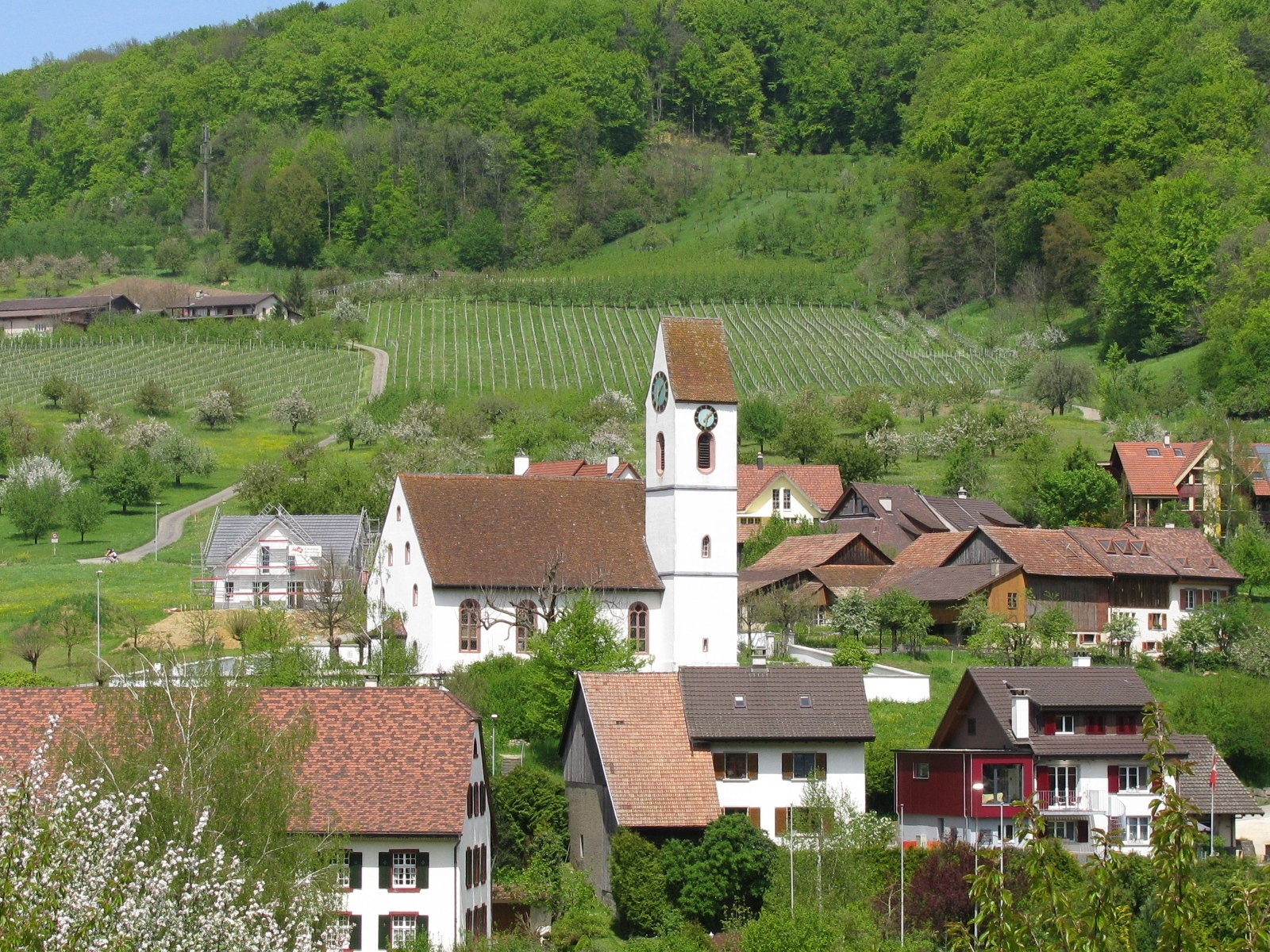

- Coat of arms
- Location of Maisprach
- Location within Switzerland Location within Canton of Basel-Landschaft
- Coordinates: 47°31′N 7°51′E
- Country: Switzerland
- Canton: Basel-Landschaft
- District: Sissach

Area
  - Total: 5.07 km^{2} (1.96 sq mi)
- Elevation: 377 m (1,237 ft)

Population (June 2021)
  - Total: 941
  - Density: 186/km^{2} (481/sq mi)
- Time zone: UTC+01:00 (CET)
  - Summer (DST): UTC+02:00 (CEST)
- Postal code: 4464
- SFOS number: 2853
- ISO 3166 code: CH-BL
- Surrounded by: Buus, Magden (AG), Möhlin (AG), Wintersingen, Zeiningen (AG)
- Website: maisprach.ch

Maisprach is a municipality in the district of Sissach in the canton of Basel-Country in Switzerland.

== History ==
Maisprach is first mentioned in 1247 as Mesbache.

== Geography ==
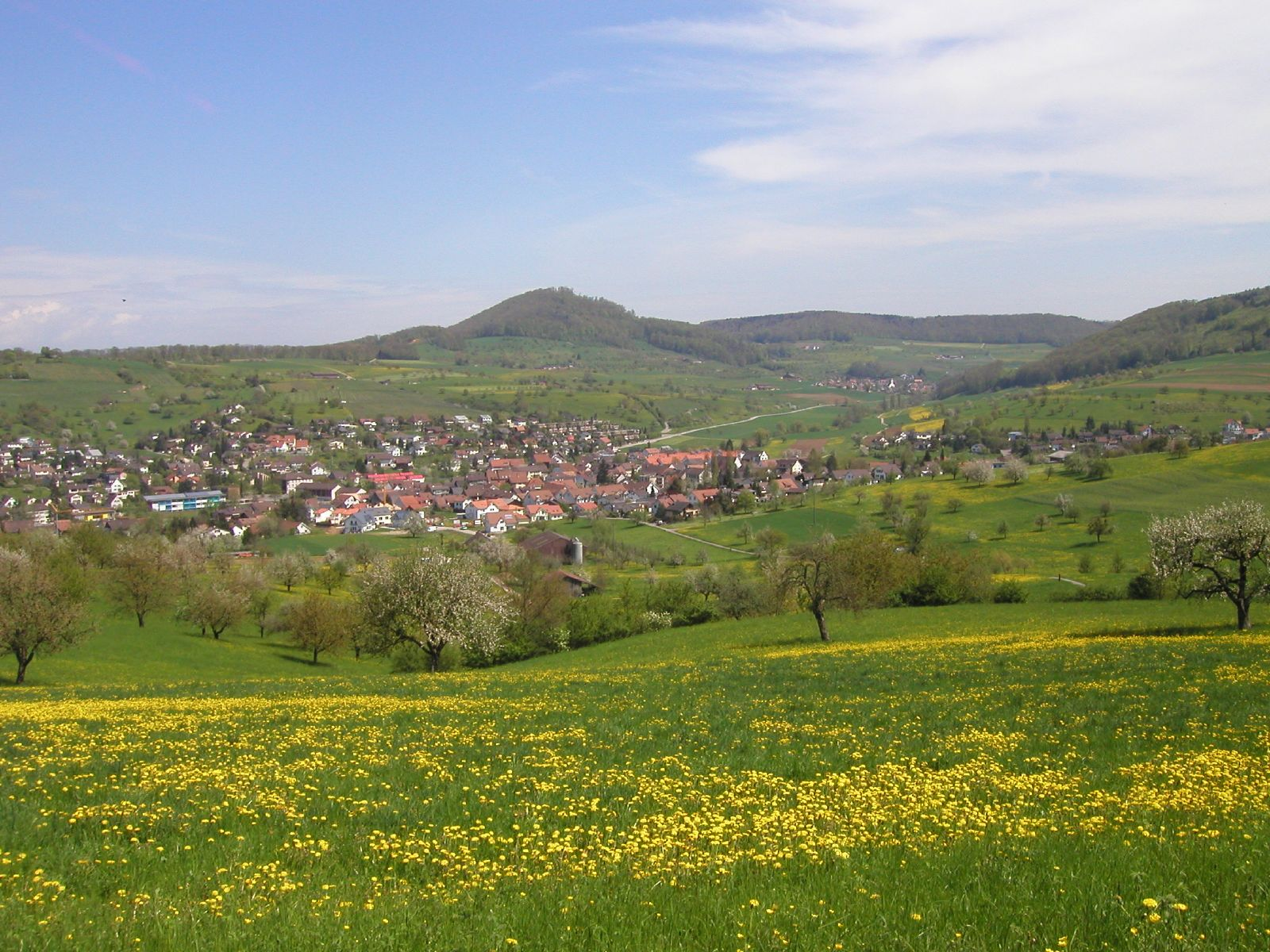
Maisprach village

Aerial view from 3000 m by Walter Mittelholzer (1923)

Maisprach has an area, as of 2009, of 5.07 square kilometers (1.96 sq mi). Of this area, 2.54 km^{2} (0.98 sq mi) or 50.1% is used for agricultural purposes, while 1.97 km^{2} (0.76 sq mi) or 38.9% is forested. Of the rest of the land, 0.51 km^{2} (0.20 sq mi) or 10.1% is settled (buildings or roads).

Of the built up area, housing and buildings made up 6.1% and transportation infrastructure made up 3.4%. Out of the forested land, 37.7% of the total land area is heavily forested and 1.2% is covered with orchards or small clusters of trees. Of the agricultural land, 16.6% is used for growing crops and 20.9% is pastures, while 12.6% is used for orchards or vine crops.

The municipality is located in the Sissach district, on the southern slope of Sonnenberg Mountain.

== Coat of arms ==
The blazon of the municipal coat of arms is Per pale Gules and Argent, a vine branch fesswise fructed of two counterchanged.

== Demographics ==
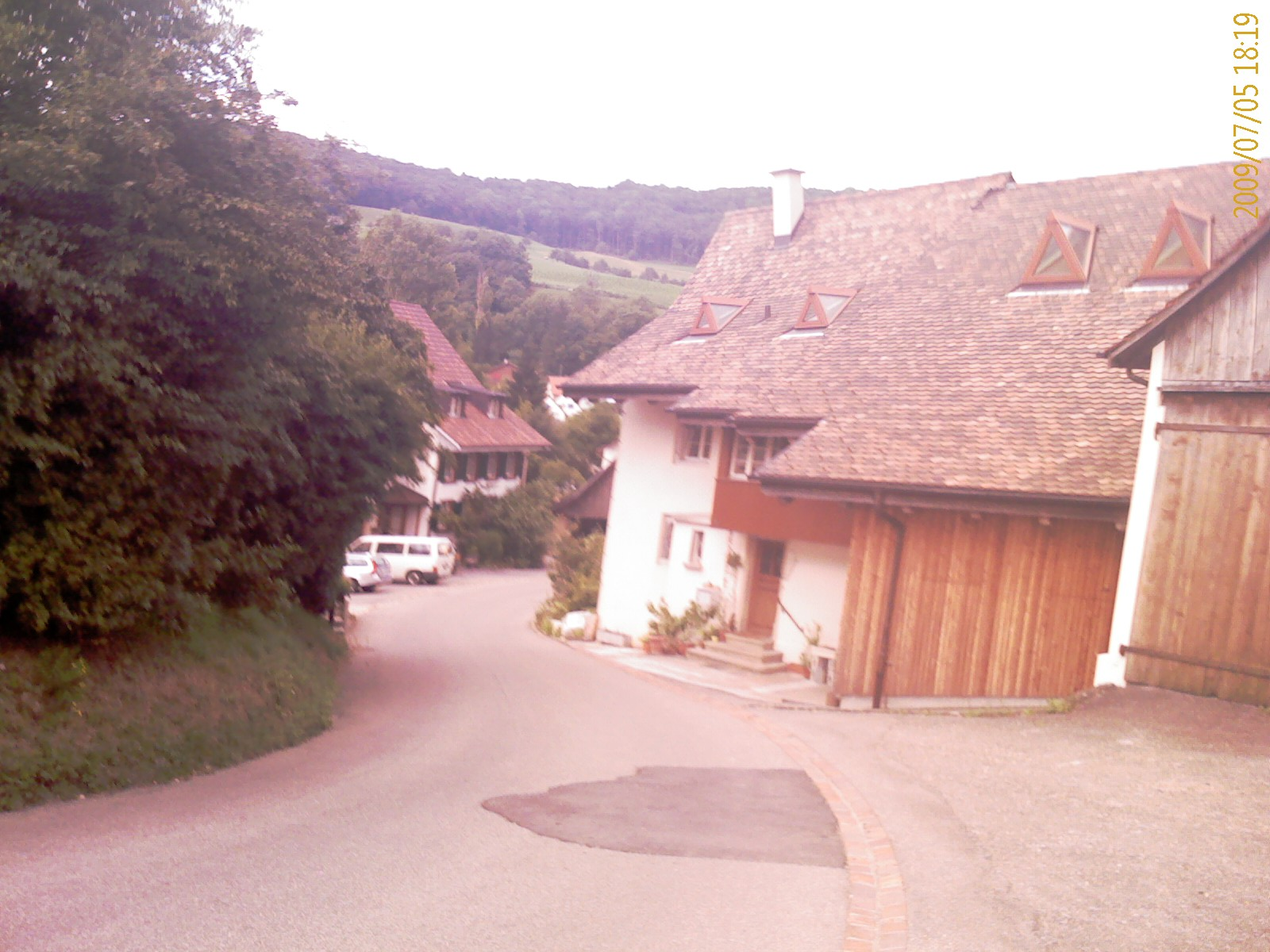
Houses in Maisprach

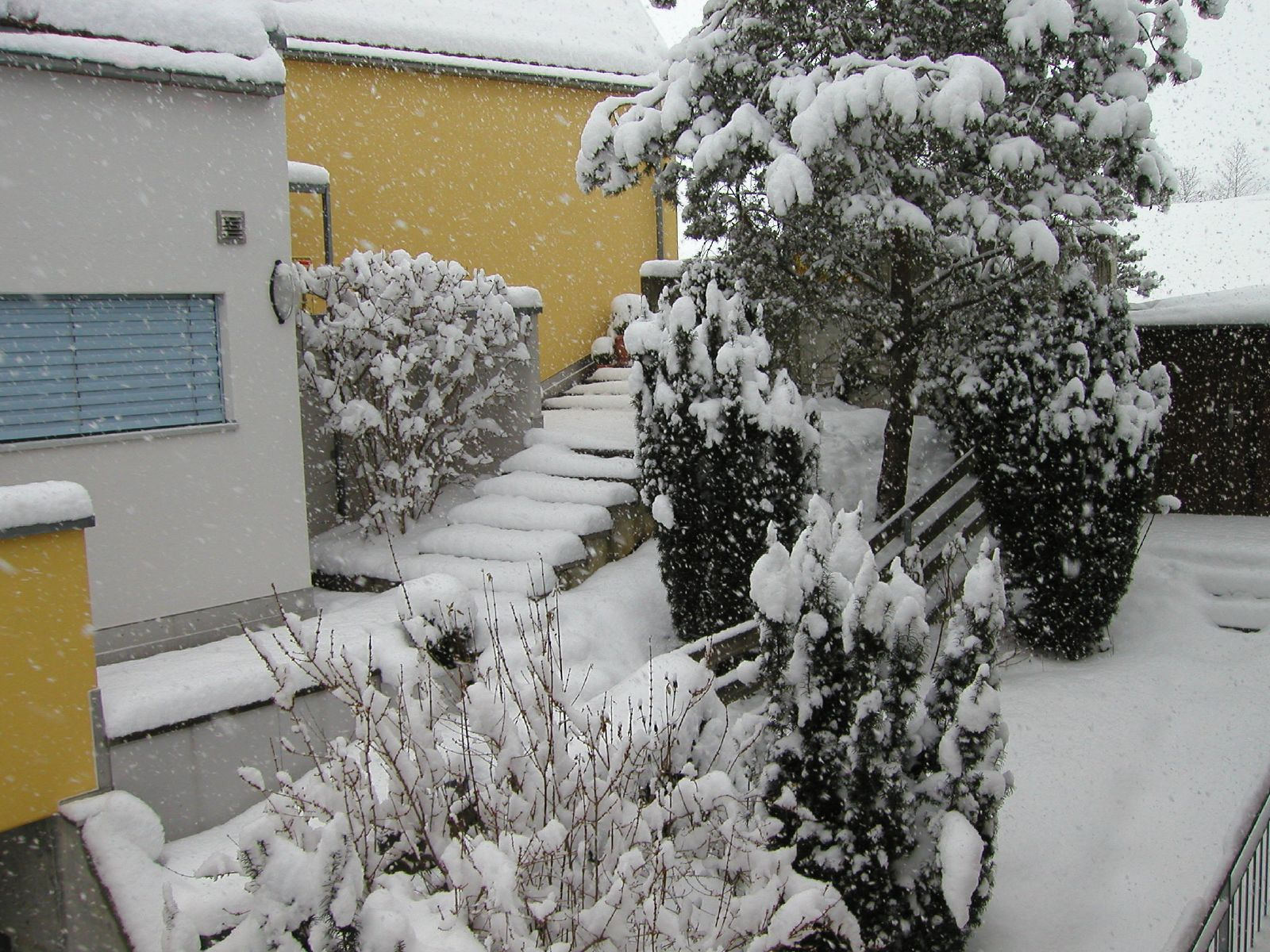
Newer houses in Maisprach

Maisprach has a population (as of June 2021) of 941. As of 2008, 9.9% of the population are resident foreign nationals. Over the last 10 years (1997–2007) the population has changed at a rate of 11.7%.

Most of the population (as of 2000) speaks German (840 or 94.9%), with English being second most common (12 or 1.4%) and French being third (6 or 0.7%).

As of 2008, the gender distribution of the population was 48.9% male and 51.1% female. The population was made up of 844 Swiss citizens (88.7% of the population), and 108 non-Swiss residents (11.3%) Of the population in the municipality 330 or about 37.3% were born in Maisprach and lived there in 2000. There were 157 or 17.7% who were born in the same canton, while 305 or 34.5% were born somewhere else in Switzerland, and 81 or 9.2% were born outside of Switzerland.

In 2008 there were 4 live births to Swiss citizens and 1 birth to non-Swiss citizens, and in same time span there were 4 deaths of Swiss citizens. Ignoring immigration and emigration, the population of Swiss citizens remained the same while the foreign population increased by 1. There were 3 Swiss men and 4 Swiss women who emigrated from Switzerland. At the same time, there were 5 non-Swiss men and 2 non-Swiss women who immigrated from another country to Switzerland. The total Swiss population change in 2008 (from all sources, including moves across municipal borders) was a decrease of 28 and the non-Swiss population increased by 9 people. This represents a population growth rate of -2.0%.

The age distribution, as of 2010, in Maisprach is; 59 children or 6.2% of the population are between 0 and 6 years old and 175 teenagers or 18.4% are between 7 and 19. Of the adult population, 100 people or 10.5% of the population are between 20 and 29 years old. 89 people or 9.3% are between 30 and 39, 208 people or 21.8% are between 40 and 49, and 196 people or 20.6% are between 50 and 64. The senior population distribution is 89 people or 9.3% of the population are between 65 and 79 years old and there are 36 people or 3.8% who are over 80.

As of 2000, there were 380 people who were single and never married in the municipality. There were 427 married individuals, 36 widows or widowers and 42 individuals who are divorced.

As of 2000, there were 339 private households in the municipality, and an average of 2.6 persons per household. There were 82 households that consist of only one person and 32 households with five or more people. Out of a total of 342 households that answered this question, 24.0% were households made up of just one person and 2 were adults who lived with their parents. Of the rest of the households, there are 106 married couples without children, 131 married couples with children There were 10 single parents with a child or children. There were 8 households that were made up unrelated people and 3 households that were made some sort of institution or another collective housing.

In 2000 there were 167 single family homes (or 64.0% of the total) out of a total of 261 inhabited buildings. There were 32 multi-family buildings (12.3%), along with 51 multi-purpose buildings that were mostly used for housing (19.5%) and 11 other use buildings (commercial or industrial) that also had some housing (4.2%). Of the single family homes 22 were built before 1919, while 64 were built between 1990 and 2000. The greatest number of single family homes (49) were built between 1981 and 1990.

In 2000 there were 350 apartments in the municipality. The most common apartment size was 5 rooms of which there were 106. There were 4 single room apartments and 169 apartments with five or more rooms. Of these apartments, a total of 321 apartments (91.7% of the total) were permanently occupied, while 14 apartments (4.0%) were seasonally occupied and 15 apartments (4.3%) were empty. As of 2007, the construction rate of new housing units was 3.2 new units per 1000 residents. As of 2000 the average price to rent a two-room apartment was about 829.00 CHF (US$660, £370, €530), a three-room apartment was about 1087.00 CHF (US$870, £490, €700) and a four-room apartment cost an average of 1551.00 CHF (US$1240, £700, €990). The vacancy rate for the municipality, in 2008, was 0.52%.

The historical population is given in the following chart:

== Heritage sites of national significance ==
The Mill at Unterdorf 16 is listed as a Swiss heritage site of national significance. The entire village of Maisprach is part of the Inventory of Swiss Heritage Sites.

== Politics ==
In the 2007 federal election the most popular party was the SVP which received 32.2% of the vote. The next three most popular parties were the Green Party (23.68%), the SP (22%) and the FDP (12.9%). In the federal election, a total of 323 votes were cast, and the voter turnout was 49.1%.

== Economy ==
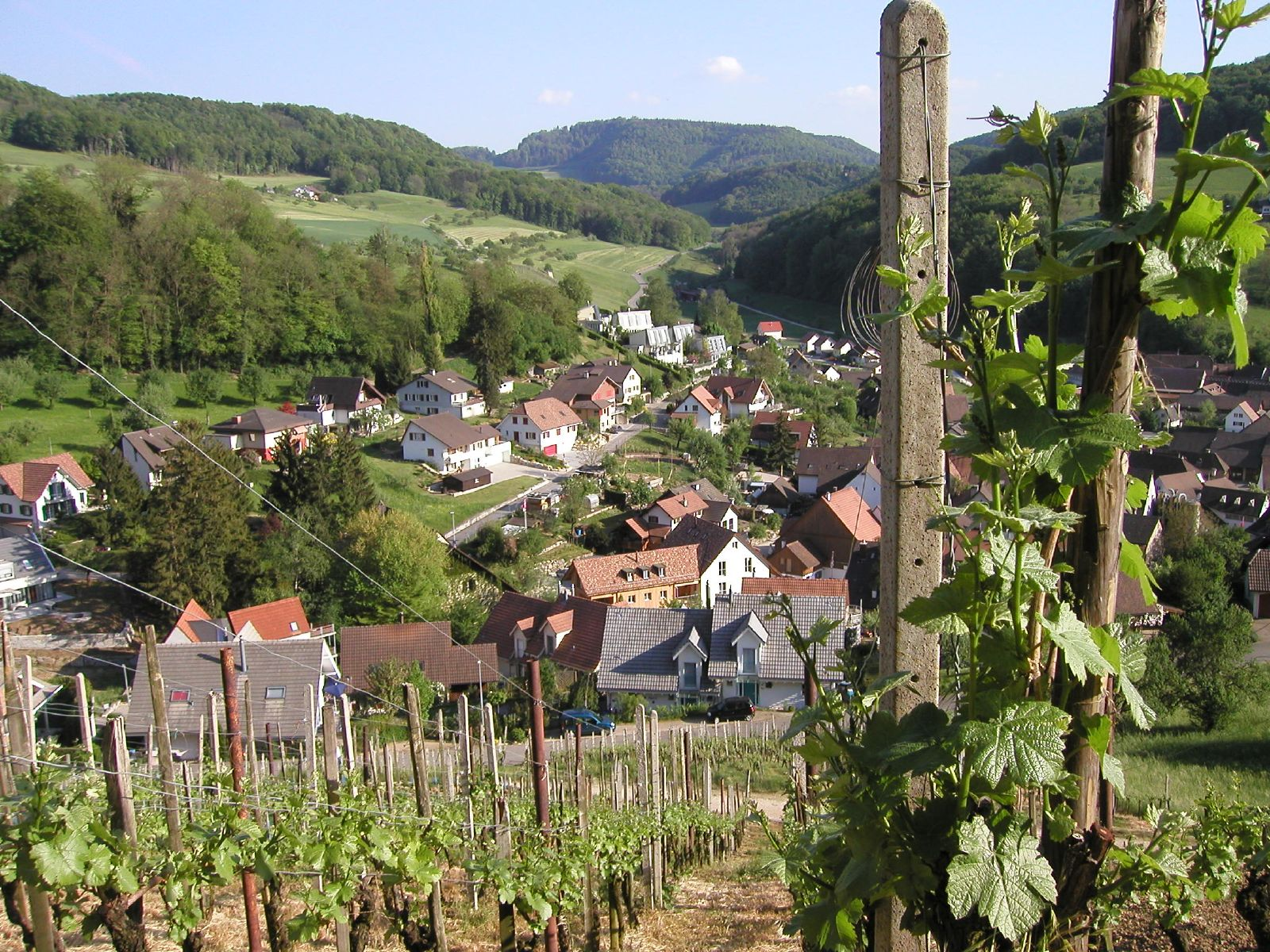
Small vineyard near Maisprach

As of 2007, Maisprach had an unemployment rate of 1.13%. As of 2005, there were 68 people employed in the primary economic sector and about 20 businesses involved in this sector. 80 people were employed in the secondary sector and there were 14 businesses in this sector. 64 people were employed in the tertiary sector, with 19 businesses in this sector. There were 458 residents of the municipality who were employed in some capacity, of which females made up 42.4% of the workforce.

In 2008 the total number of full-time equivalent jobs was 198. The number of jobs in the primary sector was 50, all of which were in agriculture. The number of jobs in the secondary sector was 89, of which 34 or (38.2%) were in manufacturing and 55 (61.8%) were in construction. The number of jobs in the tertiary sector was 59. In the tertiary sector; 2 or 3.4% were in wholesale or retail sales or the repair of motor vehicles, 1 or 1.7% were in the movement and storage of goods, 2 or 3.4% were in a hotel or restaurant, 22 or 37.3% were in the information industry, 4 or 6.8% were technical professionals or scientists, 6 or 10.2% were in education and 18 or 30.5% were in health care.

In 2000, there were 71 workers who commuted into the municipality and 339 workers who commuted away. The municipality is a net exporter of workers, with about 4.8 workers leaving the municipality for every one entering. About 15.5% of the workforce coming into Maisprach are coming from outside Switzerland. Of the working population, 20.7% used public transportation to get to work, and 51.1% used a private car.

== Religion ==
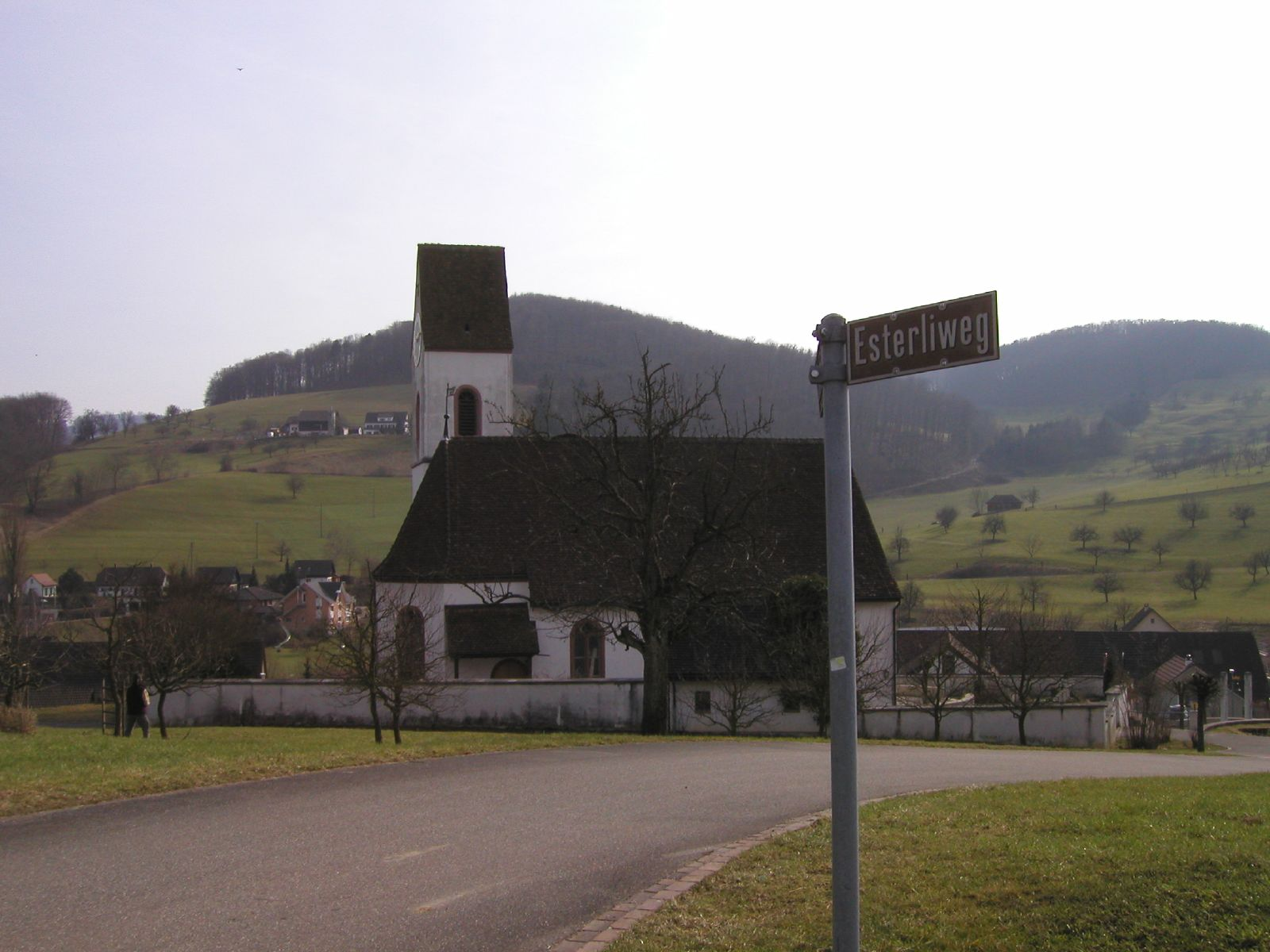
Church in Maisprach

From the 2000 census, 165 or 18.6% were Roman Catholic, while 515 or 58.2% belonged to the Swiss Reformed Church. Of the rest of the population, there were 3 individuals (or about 0.34% of the population) who belonged to the Christian Catholic Church, and there were 12 individuals (or about 1.36% of the population) who belonged to another Christian church. There were 18 (or about 2.03% of the population) who were Islamic. There were 2 individuals who were Buddhist and 1 individual who belonged to another church. 159 (or about 17.97% of the population) belonged to no church, are agnostic or atheist, and 10 individuals (or about 1.13% of the population) did not answer the question.

== Education ==
In Maisprach about 358 or (40.5%) of the population have completed non-mandatory upper secondary education, and 149 or (16.8%) have completed additional higher education (either university or a Fachhochschule). Of the 149 who completed tertiary schooling, 63.1% were Swiss men, 22.1% were Swiss women, 7.4% were non-Swiss men and 7.4% were non-Swiss women.

As of 2000, there were 72 students from Maisprach who attended schools outside the municipality.
