= Nusshof =

- Municipality
- Coat of arms
- Location of Nusshof
- Location within Switzerland Location within Canton of Basel-Landschaft
- Coordinates: 47°29′N 7°48′E
- Country: Switzerland
- Canton: Basel-Landschaft
- District: Sissach

Area
  - Total: 1.72 km^{2} (0.66 sq mi)
- Elevation: 543 m (1,781 ft)

Population (June 2021)
  - Total: 262
  - Density: 152/km^{2} (395/sq mi)
- Time zone: UTC+01:00 (CET)
  - Summer (DST): UTC+02:00 (CEST)
- Postal code: 4453
- SFOS number: 2854
- ISO 3166 code: CH-BL
- Surrounded by: Hersberg, Magden (AG), Sissach, Wintersingen
- Website: nusshof.ch

Nusshof is a municipality in the district of Sissach in the canton of Basel-Country in Switzerland.

== History ==
Nusshof is first mentioned in 1504 as der hof by dem Nussbom.

== Geography ==
Nusshof has an area, as of 2009, of 1.72 square kilometers (0.66 sq mi). Of this area, 0.97 km^{2} (0.37 sq mi) or 56.4% is used for agricultural purposes, while 0.69 km^{2} (0.27 sq mi) or 40.1% is forested. Of the rest of the land, 0.08 km^{2} (20 acres) or 4.7% is settled (buildings or roads).

Of the built up area, housing and buildings made up 2.9% and transportation infrastructure made up 0.6%. Power and water infrastructure as well as other special developed areas made up 1.2% of the area Out of the forested land, 38.4% of the total land area is heavily forested and 1.7% is covered with orchards or small clusters of trees. Of the agricultural land, 6.4% is used for growing crops and 37.8% is pastures, while 12.2% is used for orchards or vine crops.

The municipality is located in the Sissach district. It is a farm village with scattered houses throughout the hills.

== Coat of arms ==
The blazon of the municipal coat of arms is Argent, a branch of Hazel-tree Vert fructed Gules.

== Demographics ==
Nusshof has a population (as of June 2021) of 262. As of 2008, 7.2% of the population are resident foreign nationals. Over the last 10 years (1997–2007) the population has changed at a rate of 12.4%.

Most of the population (as of 2000) speaks German (197 or 98.0%), with English being second most common (2 or 1.0%) and French being third (1 or 0.5%). There is 1 person who speaks Romansh.

As of 2008, the gender distribution of the population was 52.2% male and 47.8% female. The population was made up of 196 Swiss citizens (93.8% of the population), and 13 non-Swiss residents (6.2%) Of the population in the municipality 64 or about 31.8% were born in Nusshof and lived there in 2000. There were 70 or 34.8% who were born in the same canton, while 54 or 26.9% were born somewhere else in Switzerland, and 13 or 6.5% were born outside of Switzerland.

In 2008 there were 2 live births to Swiss citizens and were 3 deaths of Swiss citizens. Ignoring immigration and emigration, the population of Swiss citizens decreased by 1 while the foreign population remained the same. There . At the same time, there was 1 non-Swiss man who immigrated from another country to Switzerland. The total Swiss population change in 2008 (from all sources, including moves across municipal borders) was an increase of 7 and the non-Swiss population increased by 2 people. This represents a population growth rate of 4.5%.

The age distribution, as of 2010, in Nusshof is; 14 children or 6.7% of the population are between 0 and 6 years old and 24 teenagers or 11.5% are between 7 and 19. Of the adult population, 11 people or 5.3% of the population are between 20 and 29 years old. 26 people or 12.4% are between 30 and 39, 52 people or 24.9% are between 40 and 49, and 50 people or 23.9% are between 50 and 64. The senior population distribution is 28 people or 13.4% of the population are between 65 and 79 years old and there are 4 people or 1.9% who are over 80.

As of 2000, there were 86 people who were single and never married in the municipality. There were 99 married individuals, 4 widows or widowers and 12 individuals who are divorced.

As of 2000, there were 77 private households in the municipality, and an average of 2.6 persons per household. There were 18 households that consist of only one person and 9 households with five or more people. Out of a total of 77 households that answered this question, 23.4% were households made up of just one person. Of the rest of the households, there are 24 married couples without children, 32 married couples with children There was one single parent with a child or children. There were 2 households that were made up unrelated people.

In 2000 there were 49 single family homes (or 70.0% of the total) out of a total of 70 inhabited buildings. There were 5 multi-family buildings (7.1%), along with 14 multi-purpose buildings that were mostly used for housing (20.0%) and 2 other use buildings (commercial or industrial) that also had some housing (2.9%). Of the single family homes 9 were built before 1919, while 10 were built between 1990 and 2000. The greatest number of single family homes (11) were built between 1971 and 1980.

In 2000 there were 79 apartments in the municipality. The most common apartment size was 4 rooms of which there were 27. There were 3 single room apartments and 32 apartments with five or more rooms. Of these apartments, a total of 76 apartments (96.2% of the total) were permanently occupied, while 3 apartments (3.8%) were seasonally occupied. As of 2007, the construction rate of new housing units was 0 new units per 1000 residents. The vacancy rate for the municipality, in 2008, was 1.16%.

The historical population is given in the following chart:

== Politics ==
In the 2007 federal election the most popular party was the SVP which received 33.04% of the vote. The next three most popular parties were the Green Party (22.51%), the SP (18.33%) and the FDP (17.17%). In the federal election, a total of 102 votes were cast, and the voter turnout was 61.8%.

== Economy ==
As of 2007, Nusshof had an unemployment rate of 0.71%. As of 2005, there were 9 people employed in the primary economic sector and about 3 businesses involved in this sector. 1 person was employed in the secondary sector and there was 1 business in this sector. 16 people were employed in the tertiary sector, with 7 businesses in this sector. There were 117 residents of the municipality who were employed in some capacity, of which females made up 46.2% of the workforce.

In 2008 the total number of full-time equivalent jobs was 17. The number of jobs in the primary sector was 5, all of which were in agriculture. The number of jobs in the secondary sector was 2, of which all were in construction. The number of jobs in the tertiary sector was 10. In the tertiary sector; 6 or 60.0% were in wholesale or retail sales or the repair of motor vehicles, 2 or 20.0% were technical professionals or scientists, 1 or 10.0% was in education and 1 or 10.0% was in health care.

In 2000, there were 94 workers who commuted away from the municipality. Of the working population, 9.4% used public transportation to get to work, and 65% used a private car.

== Religion ==
From the 2000 census, 25 or 12.4% were Roman Catholic, while 130 or 64.7% belonged to the Swiss Reformed Church. Of the rest of the population, and there were 6 individuals (or about 2.99% of the population) who belonged to another Christian church. There was 1 individual who was Islamic. 37 (or about 18.41% of the population) belonged to no church, are agnostic or atheist, and 2 individuals (or about 1.00% of the population) did not answer the question.

== Education ==
In Nusshof about 82 or (40.8%) of the population have completed non-mandatory upper secondary education, and 30 or (14.9%) have completed additional higher education (either university or a Fachhochschule). Of the 30 who completed tertiary schooling, 66.7% were Swiss men, 33.3% were Swiss women. As of 2000, there were 17 students from Nusshof who attended schools outside the municipality.
