= GdW Bundesverband deutscher Wohnungs- und Immobilienunternehmen =

The GdW Bundesverband deutscher Wohnungs- und Immobilienunternehmen e.V. (Federal Association of German Housing and Real Estate Enterprise Registered Associations) is a syndicate of housing co-operatives in Germany. Its members are smaller federations (mostly regional organizations): As “Federation of the Federations”, the GdW is the central association of the German housing industry.

== Member Federations ==
The 14 member federations of the GdW have approximately 3,200 housing enterprises as members. They represent together approximately 6.4 million dwellings, corresponding to approximately 17% of the entire and 30% of rental housing stock in Germany.

The 14 member federations of the GdW are:

- vbw Verband baden-württembergischer Wohnungs- und Immobilienunternehmen e.V.
- VdW Bayern Verband bayerischer Wohnungsunternehmen e.V.
- VdW südwest Verband der Südwestdeutschen Wohnungswirtschaft e.V.
- VdW Verband der Wohnungswirtschaft Sachsen-Anhalt e.V.
- VdWg Verband der Wohnungsgenossenschaften Sachsen-Anhalt e.V.
- Verband Berlin-Brandenburgischer Wohnungsunternehmen e.V. (BBU)
- Verband der Wohnungswirtschaft in Niedersachsen und Bremen e.V.
- Verband der Wohnungswirtschaft Rheinland Westfalen e. V.
- Verband Sächsischer Wohnungsgenossenschaften e.V. (VSWG)
- Verband Sächsischer Wohnungsunternehmen e.V. (VSWU)
- VNW Verband norddeutscher Wohnungsunternehmen e.V.
- VTW Verband Thüringer Wohnungswirtschaft e.V.
- PTW Prüfungsverband Thüringer Wohnungsunternehmen e.V.
- Genossenschaftsverband Frankfurt e.V. Hessen - Rheinland-Pfalz - Saarland - Thüringen

== Housing Enterprises ==
Housing enterprises overseen by regional organizations of the GdW can be divided as follows:

- Housing cooperatives
- Local housing companies
- Federation and national public housing companies
- Housing companies of the private sector
- Church housing enterprises
- Other housing enterprises
