= Buus =

- Municipality
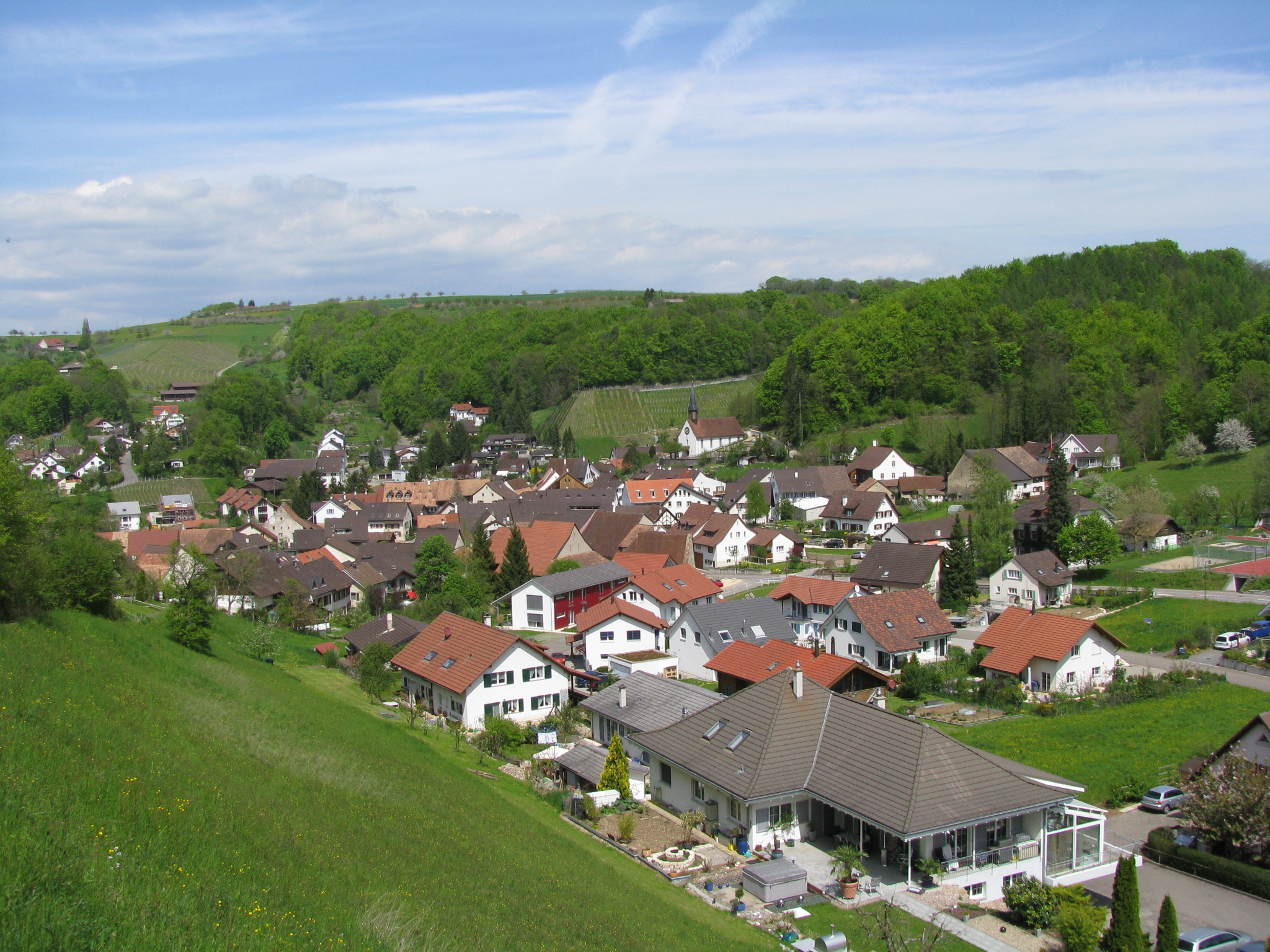

- Coat of arms
- Location of Buus
- Location within Switzerland Location within Canton of Basel-Landschaft
- Coordinates: 47°30′N 7°52′E
- Country: Switzerland
- Canton: Basel-Landschaft
- District: Sissach

Area
  - Total: 8.85 km^{2} (3.42 sq mi)
- Elevation: 445 m (1,460 ft)

Population (June 2021)
  - Total: 1,110
  - Density: 125/km^{2} (325/sq mi)
- Time zone: UTC+01:00 (CET)
  - Summer (DST): UTC+02:00 (CEST)
- Postal code: 4463
- SFOS number: 2844
- ISO 3166 code: CH-BL
- Surrounded by: Hellikon (AG), Hemmiken, Maisprach, Ormalingen, Rickenbach, Wintersingen, Zeiningen (AG), Zuzgen (AG)
- Website: buus.ch

Buus is a municipality in the district of Sissach in the canton of Basel-Country in Switzerland.

== History ==
Buus is first mentioned in 1273 as Bus.

== Geography ==
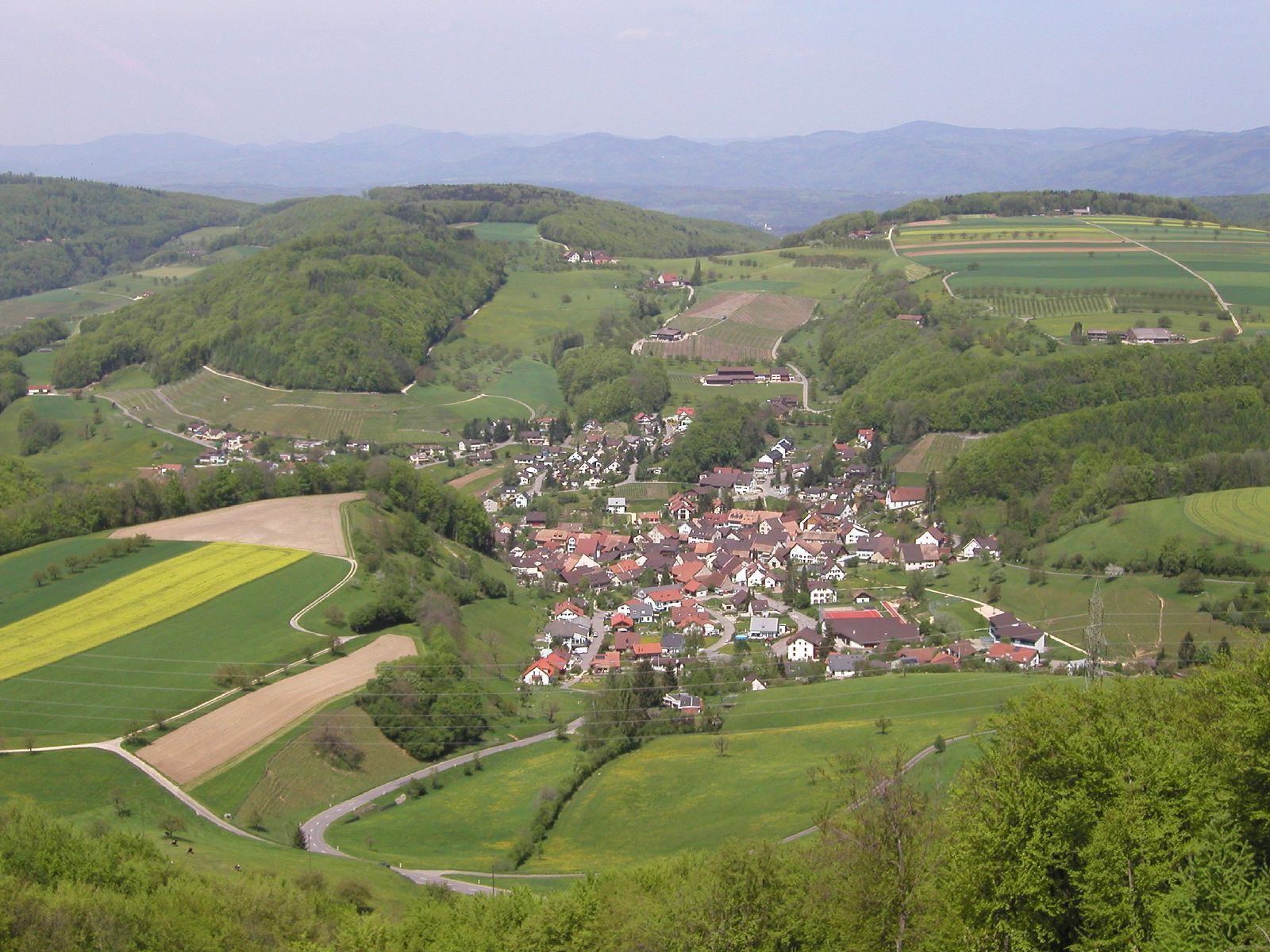
View of Buus from Farnsburg Mountain

Aerial view (1953)

Buus has an area, as of 2009, of 8.85 square kilometers (3.42 sq mi). Of this area, 5.71 km^{2} (2.20 sq mi) or 64.5% is used for agricultural purposes, while 2.52 km^{2} (0.97 sq mi) or 28.5% is forested. Of the rest of the land, 0.64 km^{2} (0.25 sq mi) or 7.2% is settled (buildings or roads).

Of the built up area, housing and buildings made up 4.3% and transportation infrastructure made up 2.5%. Out of the forested land, 26.8% of the total land area is heavily forested and 1.7% is covered with orchards or small clusters of trees. Of the agricultural land, 25.5% is used for growing crops and 30.8% is pastures, while 8.1% is used for orchards or vine crops.

The municipality is located in the Sissach district, in a depression on the north foot of Farnsberg mountain. It consists of the haufendorf village (an irregular, unplanned and quite closely packed village, built around a central square) of Buus.

== Coat of arms ==
The blazon of the municipal coat of arms is Azure, a Vine Vert fructed Azure entwined around a Rod Gules attached by two rings Or issuant from a Base Sable.

== Demographics ==
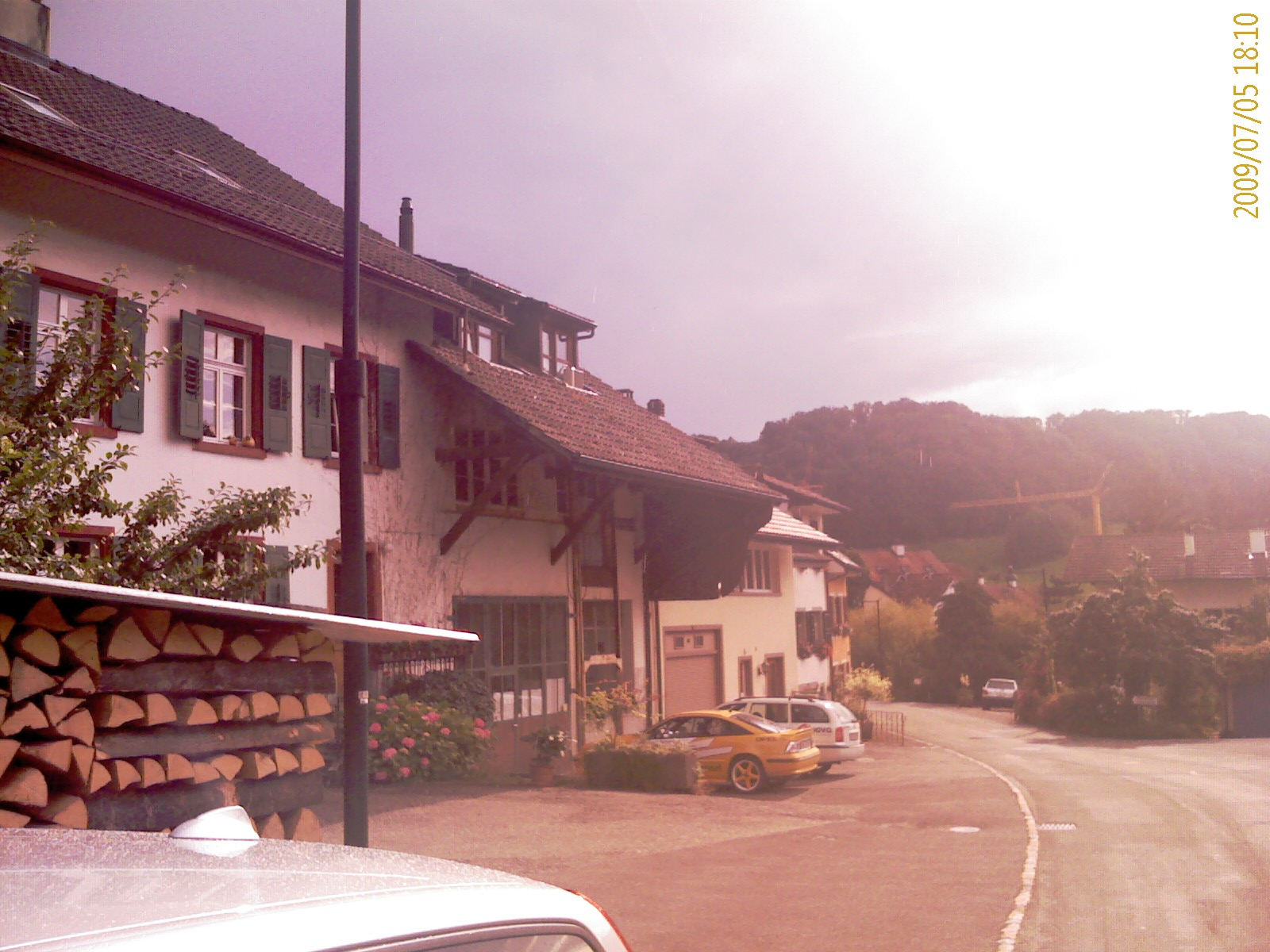
Buus village

Buus has a population (as of June 2021) of 1,110. As of 2008, 7.3% of the population are resident foreign nationals. Over the last 10 years (1997–2007) the population has changed at a rate of 9.5%.

Most of the population (as of 2000) speaks German (876 or 96.4%), with Albanian being second most common (15 or 1.7%) and English being third (4 or 0.4%). There is 1 person who speaks French, while no one speaks Romansh.

As of 2008, the gender distribution of the population was 50.1% male and 49.9% female. The population was made up of 876 Swiss citizens (92.2% of the population), and 74 non-Swiss residents (7.8%) Of the population in the municipality 395 or about 43.5% were born in Buus and lived there in 2000. There were 185 or 20.4% who were born in the same canton, while 250 or 27.5% were born somewhere else in Switzerland, and 73 or 8.0% were born outside of Switzerland.

In 2008 there were 4 live births to Swiss citizens and were 6 deaths of Swiss citizens. Ignoring immigration and emigration, the population of Swiss citizens decreased by 2 while the foreign population remained the same. There was 1 Swiss man and 1 Swiss woman who immigrated back to Switzerland. At the same time, there were 3 non-Swiss men who emigrated from Switzerland to another country and 4 non-Swiss women who immigrated from another country to Switzerland. The total Swiss population change in 2008 (from all sources, including moves across municipal borders) was a decrease of 18 and the non-Swiss population decreased by 4 people. This represents a population growth rate of -2.3%.

The age distribution, as of 2010, in Buus is; 64 children or 6.7% of the population are between 0 and 6 years old and 140 teenagers or 14.7% are between 7 and 19. Of the adult population, 96 people or 10.1% of the population are between 20 and 29 years old. 100 people or 10.5% are between 30 and 39, 181 people or 19.1% are between 40 and 49, and 202 people or 21.3% are between 50 and 64. The senior population distribution is 122 people or 12.8% of the population are between 65 and 79 years old and there are 45 people or 4.7% who are over 80.

As of 2000, there were 373 people who were single and never married in the municipality. There were 476 married individuals, 35 widows or widowers and 25 individuals who are divorced.

As of 2000, there were 341 private households in the municipality, and an average of 2.7 persons per household. There were 75 households that consist of only one person and 39 households with five or more people. Out of a total of 346 households that answered this question, 21.7% were households made up of just one person and 6 were adults who lived with their parents. Of the rest of the households, there are 111 married couples without children, 134 married couples with children There were 9 single parents with a child or children. There were 6 households that were made up unrelated people and 5 households that were made some sort of institution or another collective housing.

In 2000 there were 163 single family homes (or 59.9% of the total) out of a total of 272 inhabited buildings. There were 31 multi-family buildings (11.4%), along with 68 multi-purpose buildings that were mostly used for housing (25.0%) and 10 other use buildings (commercial or industrial) that also had some housing (3.7%). Of the single family homes 29 were built before 1919, while 59 were built between 1990 and 2000.

In 2000 there were 361 apartments in the municipality. The most common apartment size was 5 rooms of which there were 108. There were 9 single room apartments and 168 apartments with five or more rooms. Of these apartments, a total of 330 apartments (91.4% of the total) were permanently occupied, while 13 apartments (3.6%) were seasonally occupied and 18 apartments (5.0%) were empty. As of 2007, the construction rate of new housing units was 0 new units per 1000 residents. As of 2000 the average price to rent a two-room apartment was about 661.00 CHF (US$530, £300, €420), a three-room apartment was about 1071.00 CHF (US$860, £480, €690) and a four-room apartment cost an average of 1375.00 CHF (US$1100, £620, €880). The vacancy rate for the municipality, in 2008, was 0.78%.

The historical population is given in the following chart:

== Heritage sites of national significance ==
The Ständerhaus is listed as a Swiss heritage site of national significance. The entire village of Buus is part Inventory of Swiss Heritage Sites.

== Politics ==
In the 2007 federal election the most popular party was the SVP which received 48.21% of the vote. The next three most popular parties were the SP (18.85%), the Green Party (14.74%) and the FDP (11.77%). In the federal election, a total of 379 votes were cast, and the voter turnout was 53.3%.

== Economy ==
As of 2007, Buus had an unemployment rate of 0.87%. As of 2005, there were 92 people employed in the primary economic sector and about 27 businesses involved in this sector. 32 people were employed in the secondary sector and there were 9 businesses in this sector. 78 people were employed in the tertiary sector, with 29 businesses in this sector. There were 482 residents of the municipality who were employed in some capacity, of which females made up 39.6% of the workforce.

In 2008 the total number of full-time equivalent jobs was 147. The number of jobs in the primary sector was 60, all of which were in agriculture. The number of jobs in the secondary sector was 39, of which 4 or (10.3%) were in manufacturing and 35 (89.7%) were in construction. The number of jobs in the tertiary sector was 48. In the tertiary sector; 7 or 14.6% were in wholesale or retail sales or the repair of motor vehicles, 2 or 4.2% were in the movement and storage of goods, 9 or 18.8% were in a hotel or restaurant, 5 or 10.4% were in the information industry, 7 or 14.6% were technical professionals or scientists, 7 or 14.6% were in education and 1 or 2.1% were in health care.

In 2000, there were 37 workers who commuted into the municipality and 327 workers who commuted away. The municipality is a net exporter of workers, with about 8.8 workers leaving the municipality for every one entering. Of the working population, 18.3% used public transportation to get to work, and 47.1% used a private car.

== Religion ==
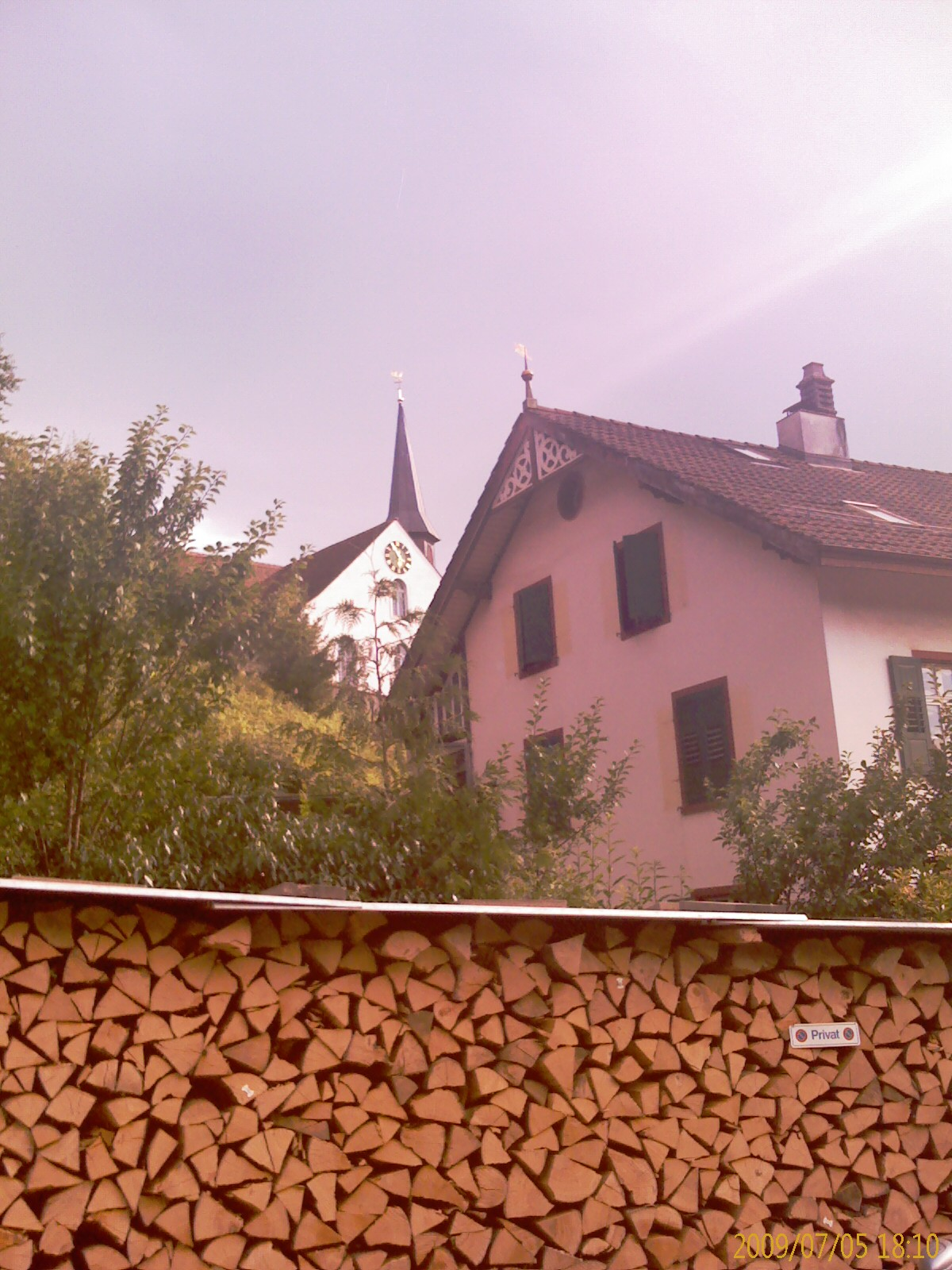
Church in Buus

From the 2000 census, 122 or 13.4% were Roman Catholic, while 633 or 69.6% belonged to the Swiss Reformed Church. Of the rest of the population, there were 5 members of an Orthodox church (or about 0.55% of the population), there were 10 individuals (or about 1.10% of the population) who belonged to the Christian Catholic Church, and there were 10 individuals (or about 1.10% of the population) who belonged to another Christian church. There was 1 individual who was Jewish, and 23 (or about 2.53% of the population) who were Islamic. There was 1 person who was Buddhist. 96 (or about 10.56% of the population) belonged to no church, are agnostic or atheist, and 8 individuals (or about 0.88% of the population) did not answer the question.

== Education ==
In Buus about 371 or (40.8%) of the population have completed non-mandatory upper secondary education, and 107 or (11.8%) have completed additional higher education (either university or a Fachhochschule). Of the 107 who completed tertiary schooling, 70.1% were Swiss men, 20.6% were Swiss women, 4.7% were non-Swiss men and 4.7% were non-Swiss women.

As of 2000, there was one student in Buus who came from another municipality, while 88 residents attended schools outside the municipality.
