= BU =

BU, Bu and variations may refer to:

== In business ==
- Business unit, a division within a company, as in strategic business unit
- Braathens ASA (IATA airline designator)
- British United Shoe Machinery, Leicester UK
- Bücker Flugzeugbau, a German aircraft manufacturer whose planes were designated 'Bü'

== Places ==
- Bu, a hamlet on Wyre in the Orkney Islands, Scotland
- Bû, a settlement in France
- Bulgaria (WMO and LOC MARC country code)
- Burma (Myanmar) (former ISO3166-1 country code)

== In mathematics, science, and technology ==
- -Bu, a common shorthand for butyl, a functional group in organic chemistry
- $\operatorname{BU}(n)$, Classifying space for unitary group
- $\operatorname{BU}$, Classifying space for infinite unitary group
- Backup, in information technology
- Bethesda unit, a measure of inhibitor activity relating to a coagulation factor
- Billion Units, used in India to mean billion kilowatt-hours ie equal to one terawatt-hour (see Kilowatt-hour#Multiples)
- Biological unit, the smallest number of protein molecules which form a biologically active unit
- Brabender unit, a unit of flour analysis measured by a farinograph

== Units of measure ==
- bu, a Japanese unit of length, equivalent to 3.03 millimetres
- bù (步), a Chinese unit of length, equivalent to 1.66 metres
- Bushel, a unit of capacity

== Universities ==
=== United States ===
- Boston University, Boston, Massachusetts
- Baker University, Baldwin City, Kansas
- Barry University, Miami Shores, Florida
- Baylor University, Waco, Texas
- Belhaven University, Jackson, Mississippi
- Bellarmine University, Louisville, Kentucky
- Bellevue University, Bellevue, Nebraska
- Belmont University, Nashville, Tennessee
- Bentley University, Waltham, Massachusetts
- Bethel University (Indiana), Mishawaka, Indiana
- Bethel University (Minnesota), Arden Hills, Minnesota
- Bethel University (Tennessee), McKenzie, Tennessee
- Bethesda University, Anaheim, California
- Binghamton University, Vestal, New York
- Biola University, La Mirada, California
- Bloomsburg University of Pennsylvania
- Bluffton University, Bluffton, Ohio
- Bradley University, Peoria, Illinois
- Brandeis University, Waltham, Massachusetts
- Brandman University, Irvine, California
- Brenau University, Gainesville, Georgia
- Brescia University, Owensboro, Kentucky
- Brown University, Providence, Rhode Island
- Bryant University, Smithfield, Rhode Island
- Bucknell University, Lewisburg, Pennsylvania
- Bushnell University, Eugene, Oregon
- Butler University, Indianapolis, Indiana

=== United Kingdom ===
- Bangor University, north Wales
- Birmingham University or University of Birmingham, central England
- Bournemouth University, Dorset, England
- Brunel University, London, England

=== Turkey ===
- Bilkent University, Ankara
- Boğaziçi University, Istanbul

=== Bangladesh ===
- BRAC University, Bangladesh
- Barisal University, Bangladesh
- Bangladesh University, Mohammadpur, Dhaka, Bangladesh

=== India ===
- Bangalore University, Bangalore, India
- Bhavnagar University, Gujarat, India
- Bundelkhand University, Jhansi, India
- Bharathiar University, Coimbatore, India
- Bharathidasan University, Tiruchirapalli, India

=== Uganda ===
- Bugema University, a university in Uganda affiliated with the Seventh-day Adventist Church
- Busitema University, Tororo, Uganda
- Busoga University, Jinja, Uganda

=== Other regions ===
- Benha University, Benha, Egypt
- Brandon University, Manitoba, Canada
- Bishop's University, Quebec, Canada
- Hong Kong Baptist University, Kowloon, Hong Kong, China
- Bahria University, Islamabad, Karachi and Lahore, Pakistan
- Bicol University, Albay, Philippines
- University of Belgrade, Belgrade, Serbia
- Benadir University, Mogadishu, Somalia
- Bangkok University, Bangkok Metropolitan Region, Thailand
- Botho University, Gaborone, Botswana

== Other uses ==
- Art Blakey, nicknamed "Bu"
- Bu Yunchaokete, Chinese tennis player
- Bu language
- Bu (instrument), a traditional Korean musical instrument
- Bu (kana), in syllabic Japanese script
- Bu (surname), a Chinese surname
- Brilliant Uncirculated, or Beautiful Uncirculated, in numismatic coin grading
- Builder (US Navy), a Seabee occupational rating in the U.S. Navy
- Bu, Kasih Suci or Bu, a 2019 Malaysian Malay-language family drama film

== See also ==
- Buu (disambiguation)
