= Rehmann =

Rehman is a German surname. Notable people with the name include:

- Anton Rehmann, Austrian botanist
- Christoph Rehmann-Sutter, Philosopher and bioethicist
- Elsa Rehmann, American architect
- Hans Rehmann (1900–1939), Swiss actor
- Lars Rehmann, German tennis player
- Lars Rehmann, German tennis player
