= Münchwilen =

Münchwilen may refer to:

- Münchwilen, Aargau, a municipality in the district of Laufenburg in the canton of Aargau, Switzerland
- Münchwilen, Thurgau, a municipality in the canton of Thurgau, Switzerland, capital of Münchwilen district
- Münchwilen District, a district within the Swiss canton of Thurgau
