= Obermumpf =

- Municipality
- Flag Coat of arms
- Location of Obermumpf
- Location within Switzerland Location within Canton of Aargau
- Coordinates: 47°32′N 7°56′E
- Country: Switzerland
- Canton: Aargau
- District: Rheinfelden

Area
  - Total: 5.03 km^{2} (1.94 sq mi)
- Elevation: 377 m (1,237 ft)

Population (December 2005)
  - Total: 1,052
  - Density: 209/km^{2} (542/sq mi)
- Time zone: UTC+01:00 (CET)
  - Summer (DST): UTC+02:00 (CEST)
- Postal code: 4234
- SFOS number: 4256
- ISO 3166 code: CH-AG
- Surrounded by: Hellikon, Mumpf, Münchwilen, Schupfart, Stein, Zuzgen
- Website: www.obermumpf.ch

Obermumpf is a municipality in the district of Rheinfelden in the canton of Aargau in Switzerland.

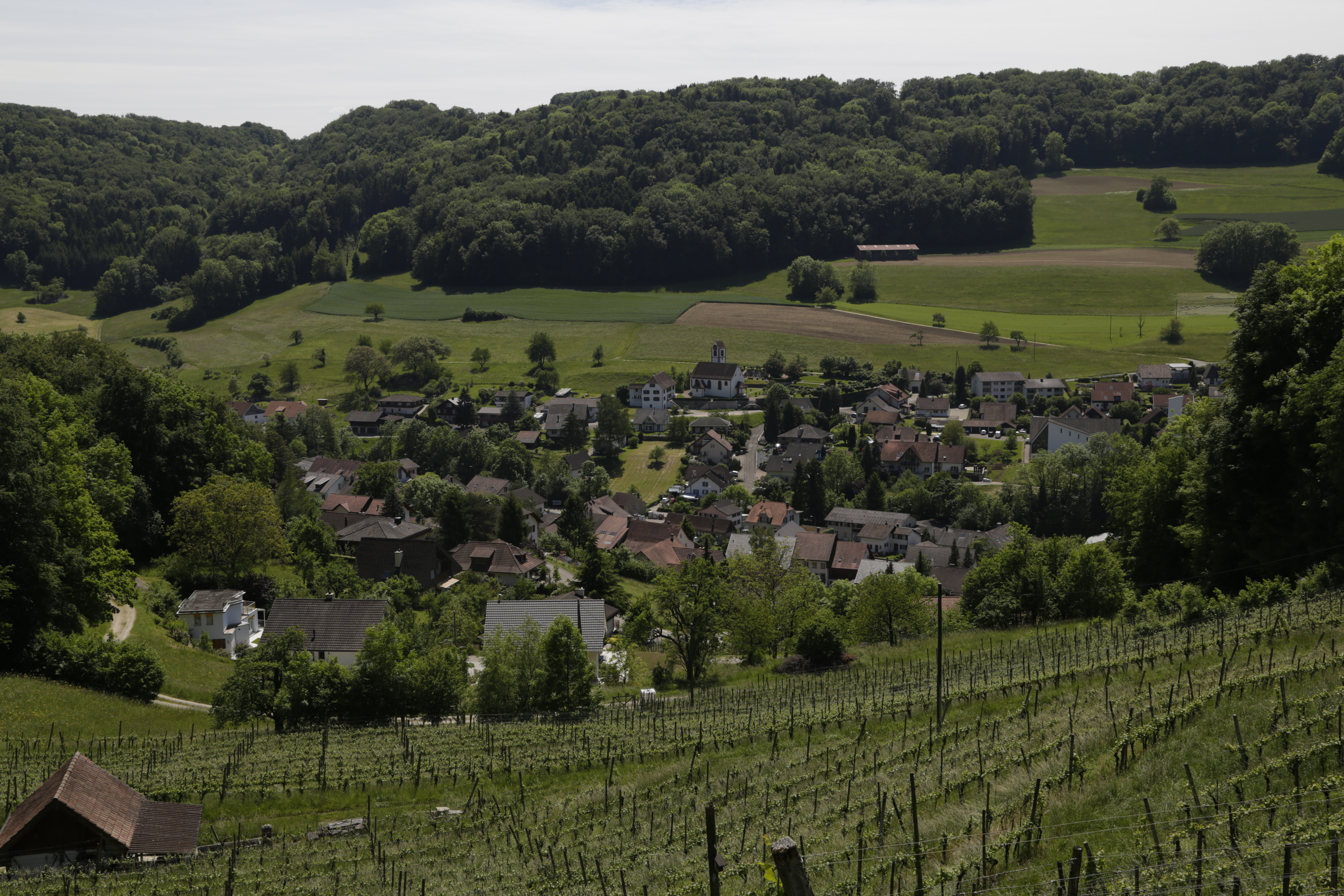
Obermumpf Rebberg

== History ==
It is likely that there was a Hallstatt culture settlement near Obermumpf, though the exact site has not been discovered. Near the village church the ruins of a Roman era farm were discovered. On the outskirts of the village, several Alamanni tombs were also found. The modern municipality of Obermumpf is first mentioned around 1302-04 as Obermumphier. Until 1797 it was part of the Austrian Habsburgs district of Rheinfelden. After the Act of Mediation in 1803, the entire Fricktal, including Obermumpf, went to the newly formed Canton of Aargau. The low justice right was held by the manor house Stein, which was owned by Säckingen Abbey. Later those rights transferred to the Austrians.

The Church of St. Peter and Paul, whose patronage rights originally belonged to the collegiate church of Säckingen, has a tower from 1494 and a nave from 1738. The original church, from the 8th Century, was built on the foundations of a Roman estate. Since 1889 it has been the center of the Christian Catholic parish of Obermumpf-Wallbach. In 1893-94 a catholic church was constructed, and was rebuilt in 1962.

== Geography ==
Obermumpf has an area, as of 2009, of 5.03 square kilometers (1.94 sq mi). Of this area, 2.65 km^{2} (1.02 sq mi) or 52.7% is used for agricultural purposes, while 1.92 km^{2} (0.74 sq mi) or 38.2% is forested. Of the rest of the land, 0.46 km^{2} (0.18 sq mi) or 9.1% is settled (buildings or roads), 0.01 km^{2} (2.5 acres) or 0.2% is either rivers or lakes.

Of the built up area, housing and buildings made up 6.0% and transportation infrastructure made up 2.8%. Out of the forested land, 36.6% of the total land area is heavily forested and 1.6% is covered with orchards or small clusters of trees. Of the agricultural land, 30.4% is used for growing crops and 17.9% is pastures, while 4.4% is used for orchards or vine crops. All the water in the municipality is in rivers and streams.

The municipality is located in the Rheinfelden district, in the Fricktal (Frick river valley). It consists of the linear village of Obermumpf.

== Coat of arms ==
The blazon of the municipal coat of arms is Or a Key and a Sword in saltire both Azure handled Sable.

== Demographics ==
Obermumpf has a population (as of December 2020) of 1,048. As of June 2009, 10.6% of the population are foreign nationals. Over the last 10 years (1997–2007) the population has changed at a rate of 1.3%. Most of the population (as of 2000) speaks German (93.0%), with Albanian being second most common ( 3.5%) and French being third ( 1.3%).

The age distribution, as of 2008, in Obermumpf is; 95 children or 9.4% of the population are between 0 and 9 years old and 147 teenagers or 14.5% are between 10 and 19. Of the adult population, 99 people or 9.8% of the population are between 20 and 29 years old. 125 people or 12.3% are between 30 and 39, 204 people or 20.1% are between 40 and 49, and 142 people or 14.0% are between 50 and 59. The senior population distribution is 98 people or 9.7% of the population are between 60 and 69 years old, 67 people or 6.6% are between 70 and 79, there are 33 people or 3.3% who are between 80 and 89, and there are 4 people or 0.4% who are 90 and older.

As of 2000 the average number of residents per living room was 0.59 which is about equal to the cantonal average of 0.57 per room. In this case, a room is defined as space of a housing unit of at least 4 m^{2} (43 sq ft) as normal bedrooms, dining rooms, living rooms, kitchens and habitable cellars and attics. About 61% of the total households were owner occupied, or in other words did not pay rent (though they may have a mortgage or a rent-to-own agreement).

As of 2000, there were 22 homes with 1 or 2 persons in the household, 194 homes with 3 or 4 persons in the household, and 153 homes with 5 or more persons in the household. As of 2000, there were 384 private households (homes and apartments) in the municipality, and an average of 2.5 persons per household. In 2008 there were 186 single family homes (or 42.8% of the total) out of a total of 435 homes and apartments. There were a total of 11 empty apartments for a 2.5% vacancy rate. As of 2007, the construction rate of new housing units was 2.9 new units per 1000 residents.

In the 2007 federal election the most popular party was the SVP which received 32.79% of the vote. The next three most popular parties were the SP (21.59%), the CVP (21.17%) and the FDP (7.93%). In the federal election, a total of 311 votes were cast, and the voter turnout was 42.7%.

The historical population is given in the following table:

Historical population
Year	Pop.	±%
1768	267	—
1850	508	+90.3%
1900	503	−1.0%
1950	595	+18.3%
1990	850	+42.9%
2000	980	+15.3%

== Economy ==
As of 2007, Obermumpf had an unemployment rate of 1.68%. As of 2005, there were 42 people employed in the primary economic sector and about 16 businesses involved in this sector. 43 people are employed in the secondary sector and there are 13 businesses in this sector. 78 people are employed in the tertiary sector, with 18 businesses in this sector.

In 2000 there were 508 workers who lived in the municipality. Of these, 404 or about 79.5% of the residents worked outside Obermumpf while 46 people commuted into the municipality for work. There were a total of 150 jobs (of at least 6 hours per week) in the municipality. Of the working population, 12% used public transportation to get to work, and 61.6% used a private car.

== Religion ==
From the 2000 census, 551 or 56.2% were Roman Catholic, while 160 or 16.3% belonged to the Swiss Reformed Church. Of the rest of the population, there were 138 individuals (or about 14.08% of the population) who belonged to the Christian Catholic faith.

== Education ==
In Obermumpf about 77.1% of the population (between age 25-64) have completed either non-mandatory upper secondary education or additional higher education (either university or a Fachhochschule). Of the school age population (in the 2008/2009 school year), there are 83 students attending primary school in the municipality.
