= Eiken, Aargau =

Eiken
- Municipality
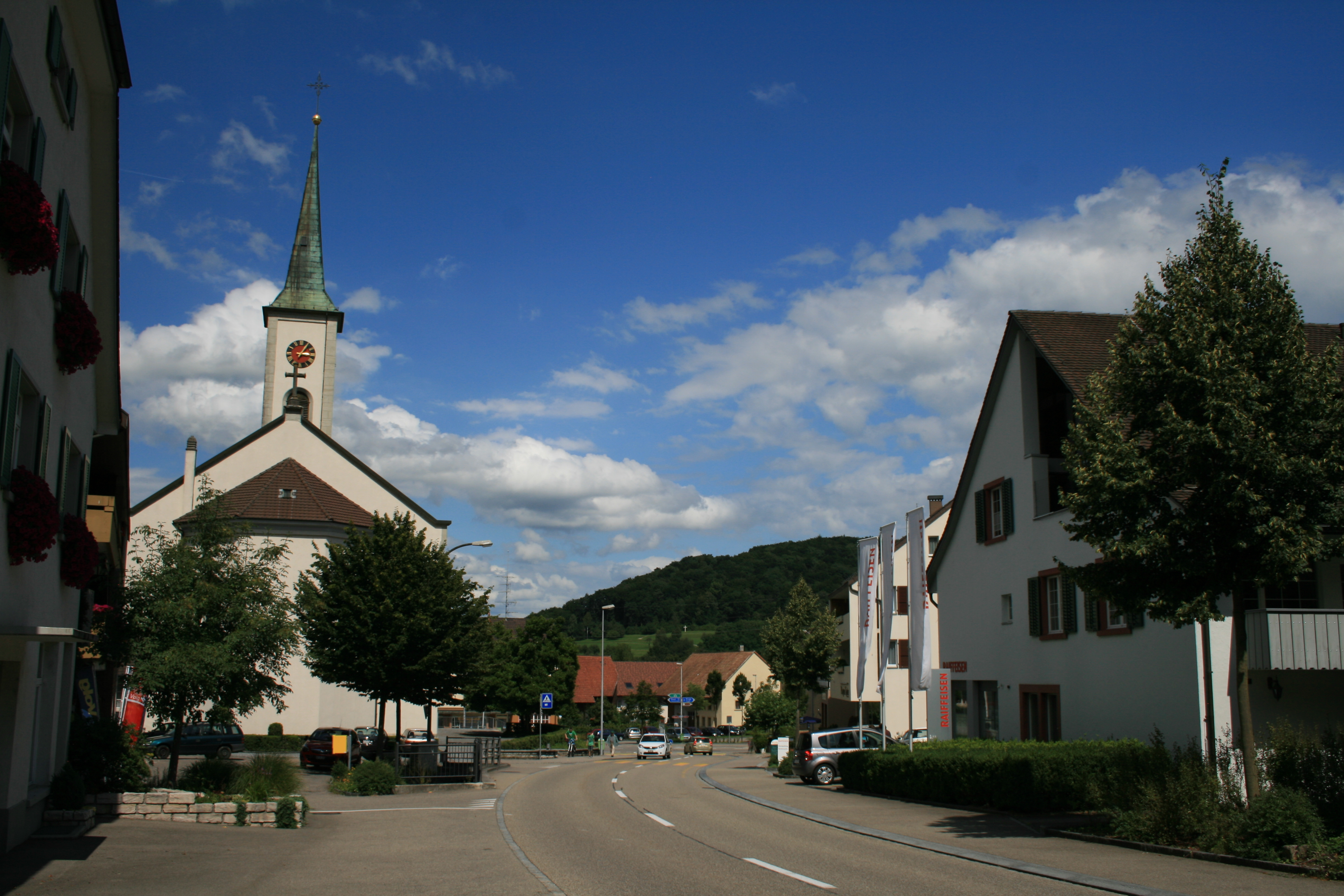

- Flag Coat of arms
- Location of Eiken
- Location within Switzerland Location within Canton of Aargau
- Coordinates: 47°32′N 7°59′E
- Country: Switzerland
- Canton: Aargau
- District: Laufenburg

Area
  - Total: 7.08 km^{2} (2.73 sq mi)
- Elevation: 330 m (1,080 ft)

Population (December 2006)
  - Total: 1,938
  - Density: 274/km^{2} (709/sq mi)
- Time zone: UTC+01:00 (CET)
  - Summer (DST): UTC+02:00 (CEST)
- Postal code: 5074
- SFOS number: 4161
- ISO 3166 code: CH-AG
- Surrounded by: Frick, Kaisten, Münchwilen, Oeschgen, Schupfart, Sisseln
- Twin towns: Eicken-Bruche (Germany), Eke (Belgium), Eecke (France)
- Website: www.eiken.ch

Eiken (High Alemannic: Äike) is a municipality in the district of Laufenburg in the canton of Aargau in Switzerland.

== History ==
The land was probably already occupied in the Roman era and individual objects from the Alamanni and Frankish Empire eras. Eiken is first mentioned in the first half of the 12th century as Eitchon. The municipality of Sisseln was originally an expansion of Eichen, and it remained part of the municipality until 1806, when it became independent.

Under the Habsburgs, Eichen was the center of the bailiwick of Eichen. The municipality bought its own Twingherrschaft, which gave it local self-rule and limited court rights, in the 16th century. Eiken belonged to the Austrian Fricktal until 1803 when it went to the newly formed canton of Aargau.

Aerial view (1954)

Some time before 1228 the Knight Rudolf Möhlin, was granted the patronage of his own church by St. Martin Church of Rheinfelden. This patronage included the Church of Eiken until 1868. Between 1871 and 1873 Eiken built a new church, which was consecrated in 1891 to St. Vincent, Joseph and Mary. The Catholic parish of Eiken includes the municipalities of Münchwilen and Sisseln.

Until the 20th century, agriculture predominated in Eiken. After World War II chemical plants and other industrial enterprises settled in the municipality. In 1990 two-thirds of the workforce worked in the industrial sector. However, by 2000 this number had dropped to about a quarter.

== Geography ==
Eiken has an area, as of 2009, of 7.08 square kilometers (2.73 sq mi). Of this area, 3.14 km^{2} (1.21 sq mi) or 44.4% is used for agricultural purposes, while 2.16 km^{2} (0.83 sq mi) or 30.5% is forested. Of the rest of the land, 1.63 km^{2} (0.63 sq mi) or 23.0% is settled (buildings or roads), 0.05 km^{2} (12 acres) or 0.7% is either rivers or lakes and 0.03 km^{2} (7.4 acres) or 0.4% is unproductive land.

Of the built up area, industrial buildings made up 5.1% of the total area while housing and buildings made up 7.6% and transportation infrastructure made up 7.8%. Power and water infrastructure as well as other special developed areas made up 1.8% of the area. Out of the forested land, 28.5% of the total land area is heavily forested and 2.0% is covered with orchards or small clusters of trees. Of the agricultural land, 31.2% is used for growing crops and 11.4% is pastures, while 1.7% is used for orchards or vine crops. All the water in the municipality is in rivers and streams. Of the unproductive areas, and .

The municipality is located in the Laufenburg district, in the upper Fricktal on the old Bözberg road from Basel to Zürich. It consists of the linear village of Eiken, which was originally a haufendorf village (an irregular, unplanned and quite closely packed village, built around a central square).

== Coat of arms ==
The blazon of the municipal coat of arms is Gules between four Ears of Wheat Or two dexter bendwise and two sinister bendwise sinister on a Pale of the last a Bailiff's Mace Sable.

== Demographics ==
Eiken has a population (as of December 2020) of 2,331 As of June 2009, 14.8% of the population are foreign nationals. Over the last 10 years (1997–2007) the population has changed at a rate of 16.8%. Most of the population (as of 2000) speaks German (91.7%), with Albanian being second most common ( 2.3%) and Italian being third ( 1.4%).

The age distribution, as of 2008, in Eiken is; 195 children or 9.8% of the population are between 0 and 9 years old and 246 teenagers or 12.3% are between 10 and 19. Of the adult population, 256 people or 12.8% of the population are between 20 and 29 years old. 276 people or 13.8% are between 30 and 39, 387 people or 19.4% are between 40 and 49, and 262 people or 13.1% are between 50 and 59. The senior population distribution is 188 people or 9.4% of the population are between 60 and 69 years old, 145 people or 7.3% are between 70 and 79, there are 37 people or 1.9% who are between 80 and 89, and there are 7 people or 0.4% who are 90 and older.

As of 2000 the average number of residents per living room was 0.56 which is about equal to the cantonal average of 0.57 per room. In this case, a room is defined as space of a housing unit of at least 4 m^{2} (43 sq ft) as normal bedrooms, dining rooms, living rooms, kitchens and habitable cellars and attics. About 66.3% of the total households were owner occupied, or in other words did not pay rent (though they may have a mortgage or a rent-to-own agreement).

As of 2000, there were 41 homes with 1 or 2 persons in the household, 399 homes with 3 or 4 persons in the household, and 249 homes with 5 or more persons in the household. As of 2000, there were 722 private households (homes and apartments) in the municipality, and an average of 2.4 persons per household. In 2008 there were 358 single family homes (or 42.3% of the total) out of a total of 847 homes and apartments. There were a total of 1 empty apartments for a 0.1% vacancy rate. As of 2007, the construction rate of new housing units was 13.8 new units per 1000 residents.

In the 2007 federal election the most popular party was the SVP which received 37.9% of the vote. The next three most popular parties were the CVP (18.2%), the SP (16.7%) and the FDP (12.7%).

The entire Swiss population is generally well educated. In Eiken about 73.1% of the population (between ages 25 and 64) have completed either non-mandatory upper secondary education or additional higher education (either university or a Fachhochschule). Of the school age population (in the 2008/2009 school year), there are 139 students attending primary school, there are 64 students attending secondary school in the municipality.

The historical population is given in the following table:

Historical population
Year	Pop.	±%
1768	451	—
1850	837	+85.6%
1900	795	−5.0%
1930	760	−4.4%
1950	892	+17.4%
2000	1,750	+96.2%

== Economy ==
As of 2007, Eiken had an unemployment rate of 2.39%. As of 2005, there were 49 people employed in the primary economic sector and about 13 businesses involved in this sector. 557 people are employed in the secondary sector and there are 18 businesses in this sector. 242 people are employed in the tertiary sector, with 41 businesses in this sector.

In 2000 there were 886 workers who lived in the municipality. Of these, 725 or about 81.8% of the residents worked outside Eiken while 215 people commuted into the municipality for work. There were a total of 376 jobs (of at least 6 hours per week) in the municipality. Of the working population, 16% used public transportation to get to work, and 55.9% used a private car.

== Religion ==
From the 2000 census, 1,024 or 58.5% were Roman Catholic, while 437 or 25.0% belonged to the Swiss Reformed Church. Of the rest of the population, there were 15 individuals (or about 0.86% of the population) who belonged to the Christian Catholic faith.

== Transportation ==
The municipality is located on the A3 motorway.

Eiken sits on the Bözberg railway line and served by local trains at Eiken.
