= Ittenthal =

- Former municipality
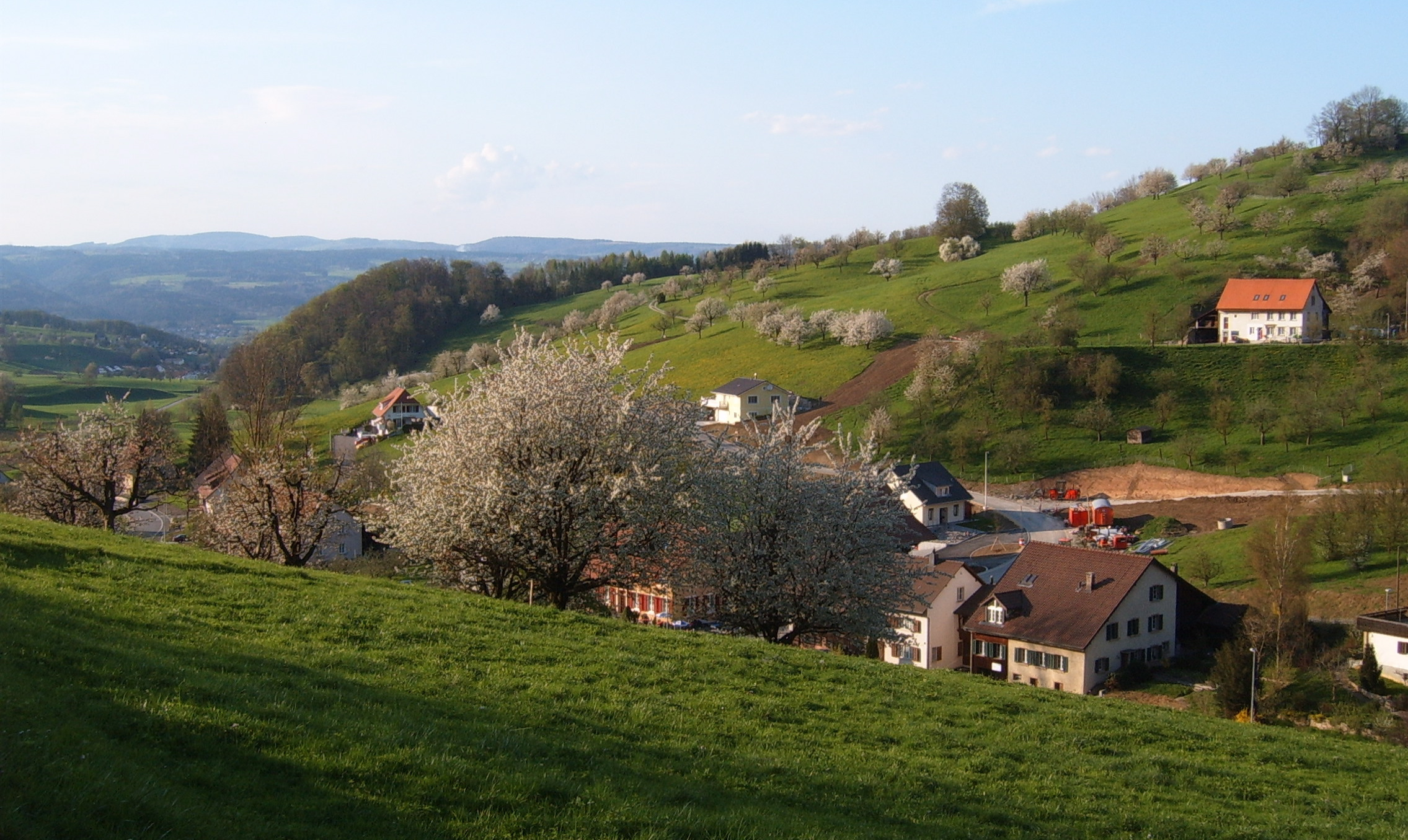

- Flag Coat of arms
- Location of Ittenthal
- Location within Switzerland Location within Canton of Aargau
- Coordinates: 47°31′N 8°04′E
- Country: Switzerland
- Canton: Aargau
- District: Laufenburg

Area
  - Total: 3.89 km^{2} (1.50 sq mi)
- Elevation: 404 m (1,325 ft)

Population (December 2006)
  - Total: 201
  - Density: 51.7/km^{2} (134/sq mi)
- Time zone: UTC+01:00 (CET)
  - Summer (DST): UTC+02:00 (CEST)
- Postal code: 5083
- SFOS number: 4168
- ISO 3166 code: CH-AG
- Surrounded by: Frick, Hornussen, Kaisten, Sulz
- Website: www.ittenthal.ch

Ittenthal was a municipality in the district of Laufenburg in the canton of Aargau in Switzerland. On 1 January 2010, Ittenthal merged into the municipality of Kaisten.

The historical population is given in the following table:

year	population
1803	171
1850	265
1900	217
1950	221
2000	222
