= Sisseln =

- Municipality
- Flag Coat of arms
- Location of Sisseln
- Location within Switzerland Location within Canton of Aargau
- Coordinates: 47°33′N 7°59′E
- Country: Switzerland
- Canton: Aargau
- District: Laufenburg

Area
  - Total: 2.52 km^{2} (0.97 sq mi)
- Elevation: 295 m (968 ft)

Population (December 2006)
  - Total: 1,325
  - Density: 526/km^{2} (1,360/sq mi)
- Time zone: UTC+01:00 (CET)
  - Summer (DST): UTC+02:00 (CEST)
- Postal code: 4334
- SFOS number: 4177
- ISO 3166 code: CH-AG
- Surrounded by: Bad Säckingen (DE-BW), Eiken, Kaisten, Münchwilen, Murg (DE-BW), Stein
- Website: www.sisseln.ch

Sisseln is a municipality in the district of Laufenburg in the canton of Aargau in Switzerland.

== Geography ==
Aerial view (1950)

Sisseln has an area, as of 2009, of 2.52 square kilometers (0.97 sq mi). Of this area, 0.82 km^{2} (0.32 sq mi) or 32.5% is used for agricultural purposes, while 0.5 km^{2} (0.19 sq mi) or 19.8% is forested. Of the rest of the land, 0.89 km^{2} (0.34 sq mi) or 35.3% is settled (buildings or roads), 0.38 km^{2} (0.15 sq mi) or 15.1% is either rivers or lakes.

Of the built up area, industrial buildings made up 9.5% of the total area while housing and buildings made up 6.0% and transportation infrastructure made up 12.7%. Power and water infrastructure as well as other specially developed areas made up 5.6% of the area while parks, green belts and sports fields made up 1.6%. Out of the forested land, 13.9% of the total land area is heavily forested and 6.0% is covered with orchards or small clusters of trees. Of the agricultural land, 27.4% is used for growing crops and 4.8% is pastures. All the water in the municipality is in rivers and streams.

== Coat of arms ==
The blazon of the municipal coat of arms is Vert a Bend sinister wavy Argent and from it issuant towards base a Bendlet wavy and in chief a Trident of the same in bend downwards. The two wavy bars represent the Rhine River (the larger one) and the Sissle River (the smaller one)."

== Demographics ==
Sisseln has a population (as of December 2020) of 1,661 As of June 2009, 17.0% of the population are foreign nationals. Over the last 10 years (1997–2007) the population has changed at a rate of 10.4%. Most of the population (as of 2000) speaks German (91.9%), with Italian being second most common (2.4%) and French being third (0.9%).

The age distribution, as of 2008, in Sisseln is; 149 children or 11.3% of the population are between 0 and 9 years old and 145 teenagers or 11.0% are between 10 and 19. Of the adult population, 142 people or 10.8% of the population are between 20 and 29 years old. 196 people or 14.9% are between 30 and 39, 252 people or 19.2% are between 40 and 49, and 199 people or 15.1% are between 50 and 59. The senior population distribution is 136 people or 10.3% of the population are between 60 and 69 years old, 65 people or 4.9% are between 70 and 79, there are 28 people or 2.1% are between 80 and 89, and there are 3 people or 0.2% who are 90 and older.

As of 2000, there were 20 homes with 1 or 2 persons in the household, 248 homes with 3 or 4 persons in the household, and 241 homes with 5 or more persons in the household. As of 2000, there were 521 private households (homes and apartments) in the municipality, and an average of 2.4 persons per household. In 2008 there were 279 single family homes (or 46.4% of the total) out of a total of 601 homes and apartments. There were a total of 8 empty apartments for a 1.3% vacancy rate. As of 2007, the construction rate of new housing units was 8.1 new units per 1000 residents.

In the 2007 federal election the most popular party was the SVP which received 40.9% of the vote. The next three most popular parties were the CVP (20.1%), the SP (13%) and the FDP (11.1%).

In Sisseln about 74.1% of the population (between age 25–64) have completed either non-mandatory upper secondary education or additional higher education (either university or a Fachhochschule). Of the school age population (in the 2008/2009 school year), there are 123 students attending primary school in the municipality.

The historical population is given in the following table:

Historical population
Year	Pop.	±%
1975	608	—
1980	745	+22.5%
1990	1,182	+58.7%
2000	1,282	+8.5%

== Economy ==
As of 2007, Sisseln had an unemployment rate of 2.16%. As of 2005, there were 12 people employed in the primary economic sector and about 4 businesses involved in this sector. 616 people are employed in the secondary sector and there are 18 businesses in this sector. 292 people are employed in the tertiary sector, with 39 businesses in this sector.

In 2000 there were 697 workers who lived in the municipality. Of these, 506 or about 72.6% of the residents worked outside Sisseln while 914 people commuted into the municipality for work. There were a total of 1,105 jobs (of at least 6 hours per week) in the municipality. Of the working population, 15.7% used public transportation to get to work, and 58.8% used a private car.

== Religion ==
From the 2000 census, 563 or 44.7% were Roman Catholic, while 380 or 30.2% belonged to the Swiss Reformed Church. Of the rest of the population, there were 6 individuals (or about 0.48% of the population) who belonged to the Christian Catholic faith.
