= Stein, Aargau =

Stein
- Municipality
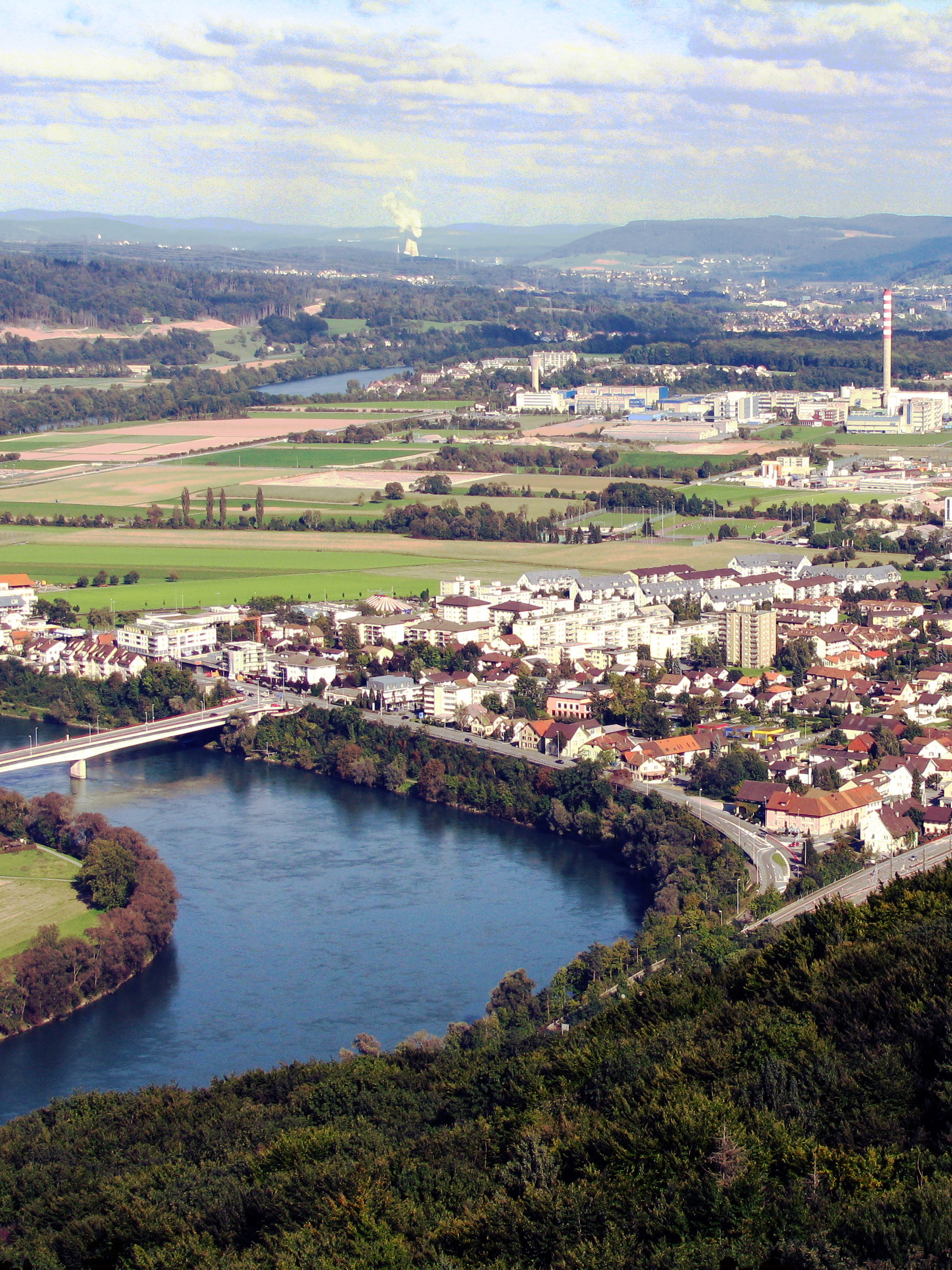
- Stein and the Rhine River

- Flag Coat of arms
- Location of Stein
- Location within Switzerland Location within Canton of Aargau
- Coordinates: 47°33′N 7°57′E
- Country: Switzerland
- Canton: Aargau
- District: Rheinfelden

Area
  - Total: 2.81 km^{2} (1.08 sq mi)
- Elevation: 299 m (981 ft)

Population (December 2005)
  - Total: 2,502
  - Density: 890/km^{2} (2,310/sq mi)
- Time zone: UTC+01:00 (CET)
  - Summer (DST): UTC+02:00 (CEST)
- Postal code: 4332
- SFOS number: 4260
- ISO 3166 code: CH-AG
- Surrounded by: Bad Säckingen (DE-BW), Mumpf, Münchwilen, Obermumpf, Sisseln
- Website: www.gemeinde-stein.ch

Stein (German pronunciation: [ʃtaɪn]) is a municipality in the district of Rheinfelden in the canton of Aargau, Switzerland.

The town lies across the Rhine River from Bad Säckingen in the German state of Baden-Württemberg. Two bridges link the two city, one vehicular (Fridolinsbrücke) and the other, the Holzbrücke pedestrian bridge.

The Stein-Säckingen railway station is located in Stein.

== Geography ==
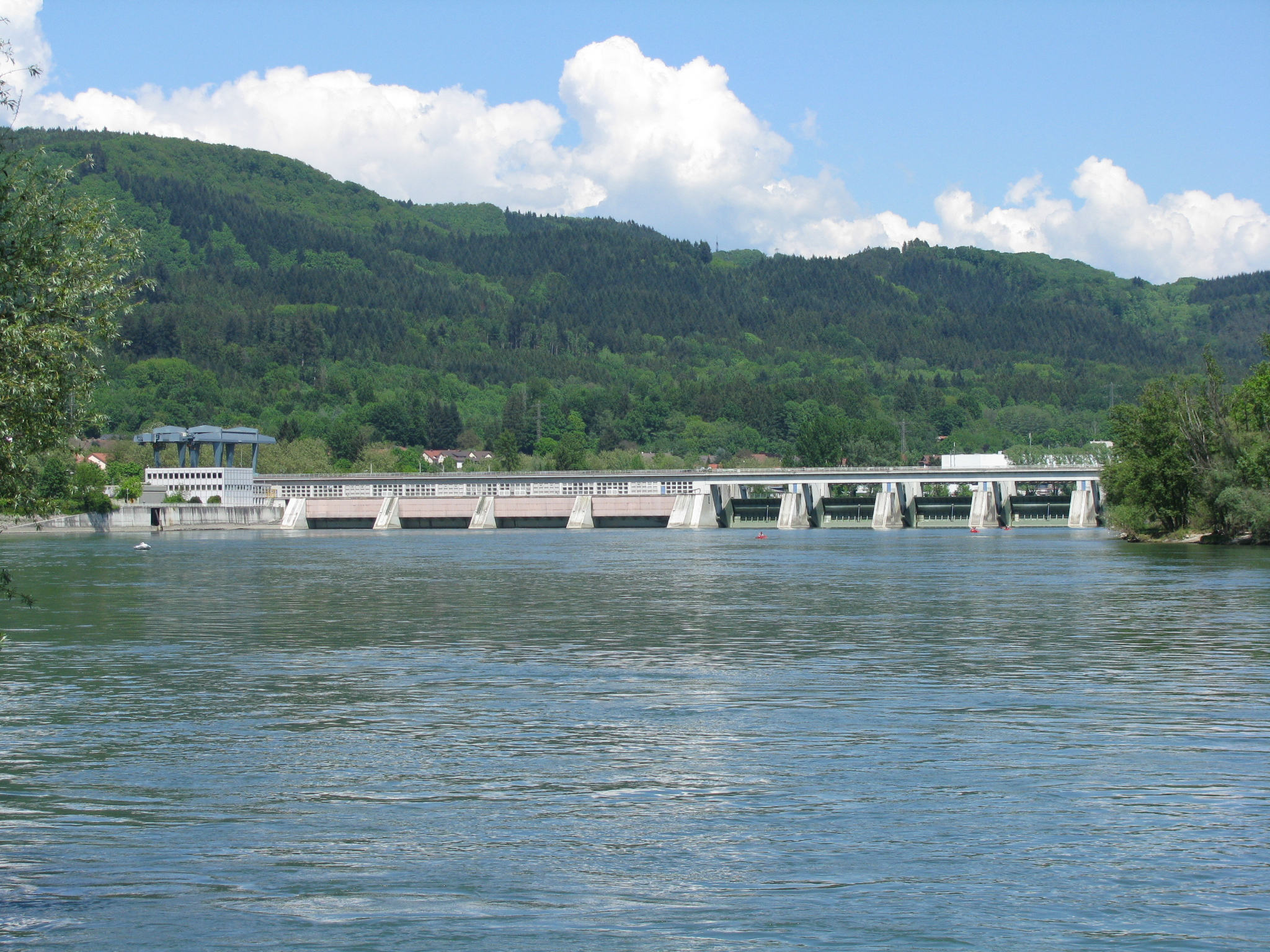
Hydroelectric power plant that crosses the Rhine from Bad Säckingen (Germany) and Stein (Switzerland)

Aerial view (1949)

Stein has an area, as of 2009, of 2.81 square kilometers (1.08 sq mi). Of this area, 0.8 km^{2} (0.31 sq mi) or 28.5% is used for agricultural purposes, while 0.62 km^{2} (0.24 sq mi) or 22.1% is forested. Of the rest of the land, 1.1 km^{2} (0.42 sq mi) or 39.1% is settled (buildings or roads), 0.29 km^{2} (0.11 sq mi) or 10.3% is either rivers or lakes.

Of the built up area, industrial buildings comprise approximately 8.9% of the total area; housing and buildings account for 13.9% transportation infrastructure, 13.5%, parks, with green belts and sports fields making up 2.1%. Out of the forested land, 19.9% of the total land area is heavily forested and 2.1% is covered with orchards or small clusters of trees. Of the agricultural land, 19.9% is used for growing crops and 7.1% is pastures, while 1.4% is used for orchards or vine crops. All the water in the municipality is in rivers and streams.

== Coat of arms ==
The blazon of the municipal coat of arms is Gules a Fiddle Argent bendwise with neck downwards.

== Demographics ==
Stein has a population (as of December 2020) of 3,253. As of June 2009, 33.6% of whom are foreign nationals. Over the last 10 years (1997–2007) the population has changed at a rate of 18.7%. Most of the population (as of 2000) speaks German (86.6%), with Italian being second most common ( 3.6%) and Albanian being third ( 3.0%).

The age distribution, as of 2008, in Stein is; 248 children or 8.8% of the population are between 0 and 9 years old and 317 teenagers or 11.2% are between 10 and 19. Of the adult population, 407 people or 14.4% of the population are between 20 and 29 years old. 404 people or 14.3% are between 30 and 39, 513 people or 18.2% are between 40 and 49, and 400 people or 14.2% are between 50 and 59. The senior population distribution is 264 people or 9.3% of the population are between 60 and 69 years old, 168 people or 5.9% are between 70 and 79, there are 94 people or 3.3% who are between 80 and 89, and there are 10 people or 0.4% who are 90 and older.

As of 2000 the average number of residents per living room was 0.58, approximately the same as the cantonal average of 0.57 per room. In this case, a room is defined as space of a housing unit of at least 4 m^{2} (43 sq ft) as normal bedrooms, dining rooms, living rooms, kitchens and habitable cellars and attics. About 38.7% of the total households were owner occupied, or in other words did not pay rent (though they may have a mortgage or a rent-to-own agreement).

As of 2000, there were 104 homes with 1 or 2 persons in the household, 657 homes with 3 or 4 persons in the household, and 255 homes with 5 or more persons in the household. As of 2000, there were 1,037 private households (homes and apartments) in the municipality, and an average of 2.3 persons per household. In 2008 there were 330 single family homes (or 26.7% of the total) out of a total of 1,235 homes and apartments. There were a total of 7 empty apartments for a 0.6% vacancy rate. As of 2007, the construction rate of new housing units was 17.6 new units per 1000 residents.

In the 2007 federal election the most popular party was the SVP which received 34.45% of the vote. The next three most popular parties were the SP (17.79%), the FDP (17.11%) and the CVP (16.91%). In the federal election, a total of 600 votes were cast, with a voter turnout of 37.8%.

The historical population is given in the following table:

Historical population
Year	Pop.	±%
1975	1,777	—
1980	1,781	+0.2%
1990	1,926	+8.1%
2000	2,375	+23.3%

== Heritage sites of national significance ==
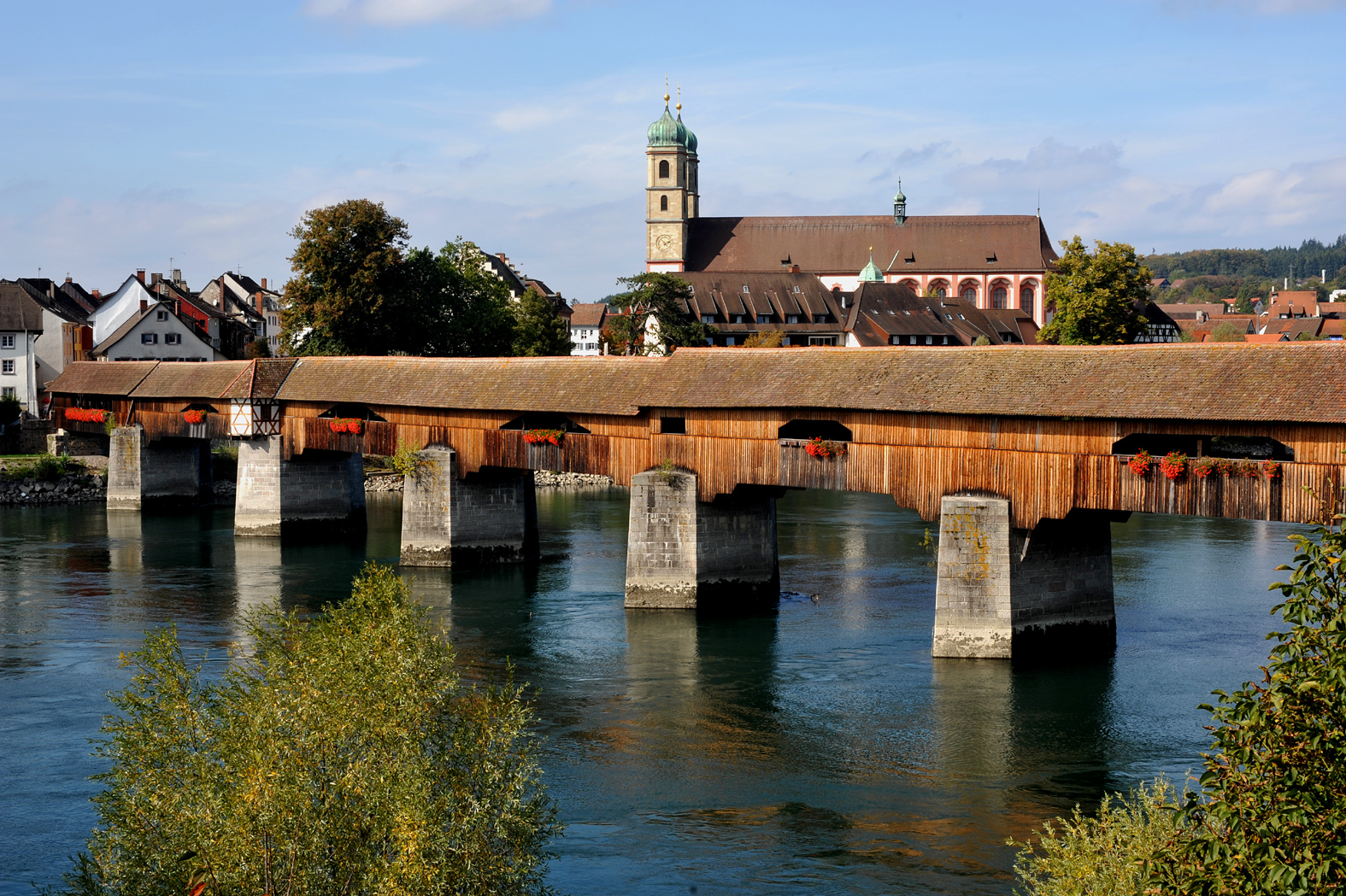
Wooden bridge between Bad Säckingen (Germany) and Stein (Switzerland)

The Säckingerbrücke (wooden bridge) at Schaffhauserstrasse is listed as a Swiss heritage site of national significance.

== Economy ==
As of 2007, Stein's unemployment rate was 3.77%. As of 2005, there were 11 people employed in the primary economic sector and about 5 businesses involved in this sector. 1,611 people are employed in the secondary sector which features 22 businesses. 597 people are employed in the tertiary sector, with 89 businesses in this sector.

In 2000 there were 1,251 workers who lived in the municipality. Of these, 855 or about 68.3% of the residents worked outside Stein while 1,446 people commuted into the municipality for work. There were a total of 1,842 jobs (of at least 6 hours per week) in the municipality. Of the working population, 18.6% used public transportation to get to work, and 46.2% used a private car.

== Religion ==
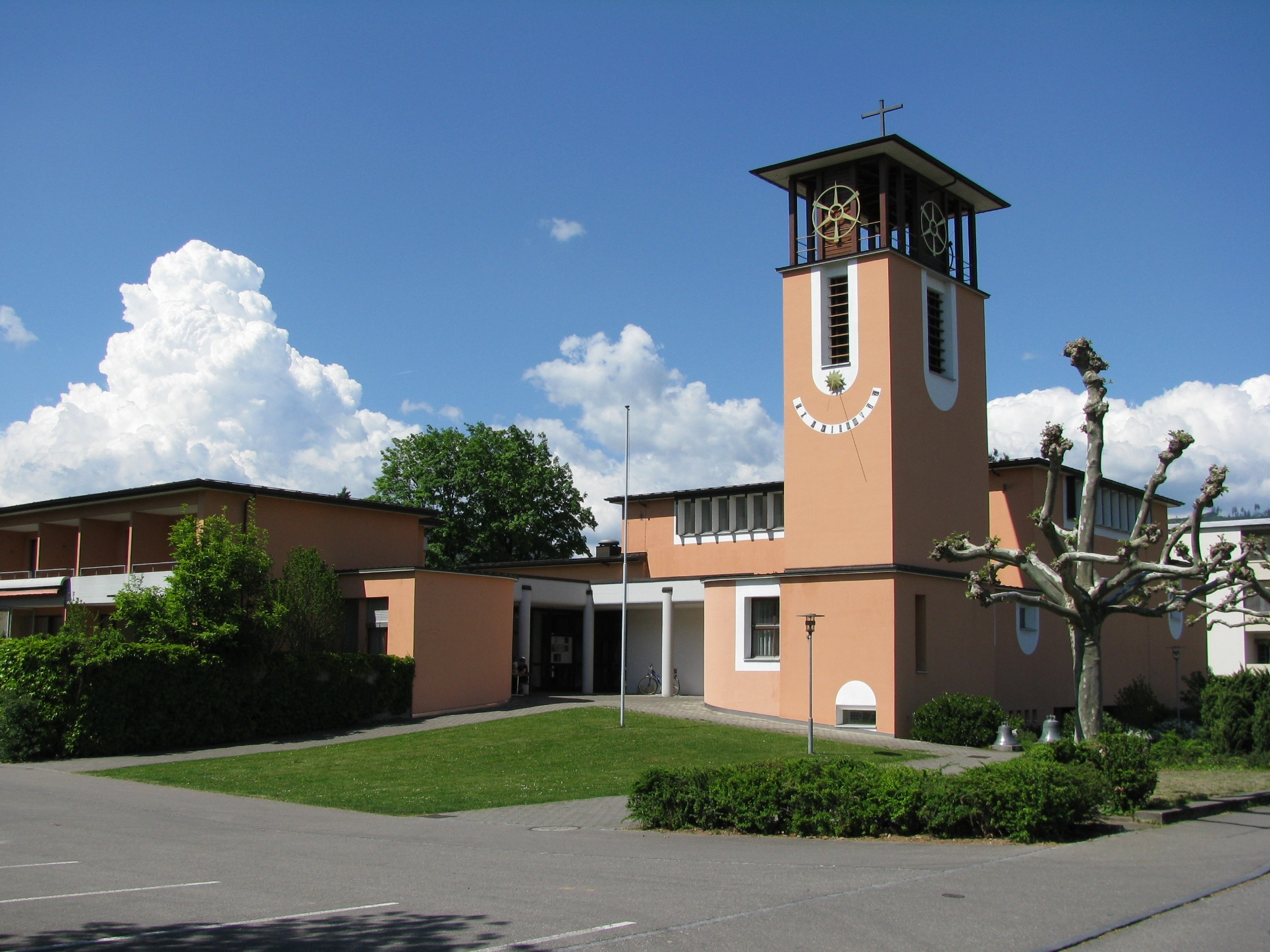
Roman Catholic church in Stein

From the 2000 census, 1,100 or 45.6% were Roman Catholic, while 688 or 28.5% belonged to the Swiss Reformed Church. Of the rest of the population, there were around 30 individuals (or about 1.24% of the population) who belonged to the Christian Catholic faith.

== Education ==
The entire Swiss population is generally well-educated. In Stein about 65.4% of the population (between age 25–64) have completed either non-mandatory upper secondary education or additional higher education (either university or a Fachhochschule). Of the school age population (in the 2008/2009 school year), there are 200 students attending primary school, there are 81 students attending secondary school in the municipality.
