= Laufenburg, Aargau =

Laufenburg
- Municipality
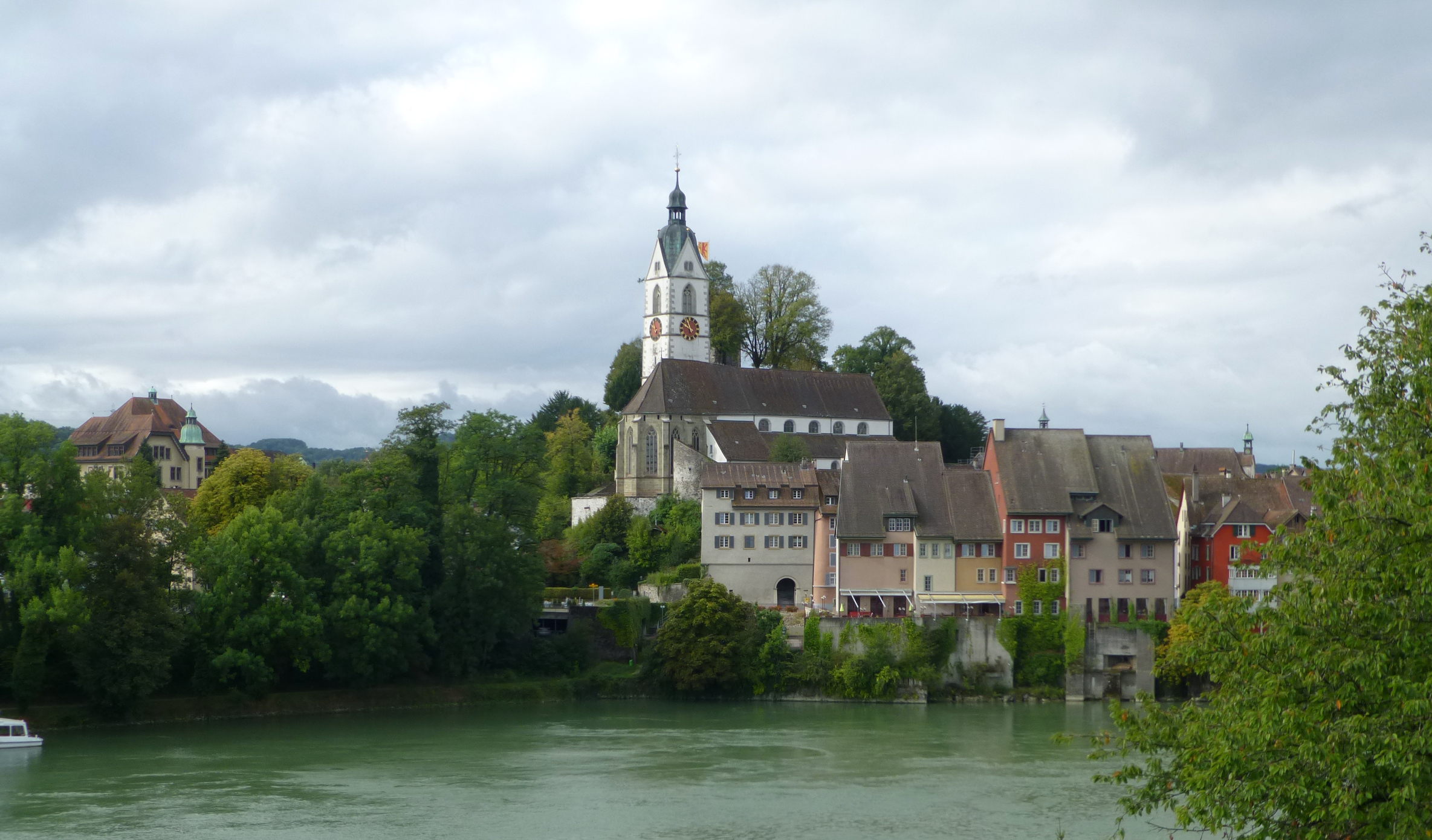
- The old town viewed from the German side

- Flag Coat of arms
- Location of Laufenburg
- Location within Switzerland Location within Canton of Aargau
- Coordinates: 47°34′N 8°4′E
- Country: Switzerland
- Canton: Aargau
- District: Laufenburg

Area
  - Total: 14.47 km^{2} (5.59 sq mi)
- Elevation: 315 m (1,033 ft)

Population (December 2006)
  - Total: 2,065
  - Density: 142.7/km^{2} (369.6/sq mi)
- Time zone: UTC+01:00 (CET)
  - Summer (DST): UTC+02:00 (CEST)
- Postal code: 5080
- SFOS number: 4170
- ISO 3166 code: CH-AG
- Surrounded by: Kaisten, Laufenburg (DE-BW), Sulz
- Website: laufenburg.ch

Laufenburg (Swiss Standard German pronunciation: [ˈlaʊfn̩ˌbʊrɡ]) is a municipality in the Swiss canton of Aargau. It is the seat of the district of the same name. On 1 January 2010 the municipality Sulz merged into Laufenburg.

It has approximately 2000 inhabitants. On the other side of the Rhine River lies Laufenburg (Baden), Germany. The same name is not by accident, as the two used to be the same city. In the early 19th century Napoleon divided the city. Two bridges now link both cities.

In 1985, Laufenburg received the Wakker Prize for the development and preservation of its architectural heritage.

== History ==
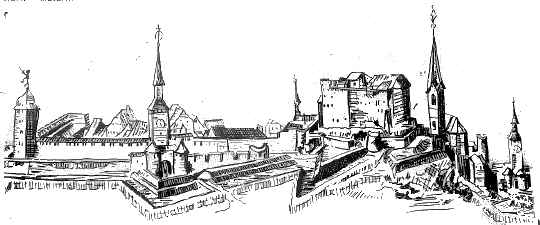
The fortifications in 1640

A high point along the Rhine river with a rapids section about 8 km (5.0 mi) from Säckingen Abbey was chosen as a place for a strategic bridge over the river. The Kastvogtei (a feudal land holder appointed by the Abbey) transferred his loyalty to the Habsburgs in 1173. Laufenburg is first mentioned in 1207 as Loufenberc. In this 1207 document, the rights of the Abbey to parts of the village were secured while the castles on both sides of the Rhine were given over to the Kastvogt. This allowed Rudolf II of Habsburg to expand the site to the city. He is considered the founder of the city. After his death in 1232, the family split into the dominant line of Habsburg-Austria and the younger line of Habsburg-Laufenburg. The last representative of the Habsburg-Laufenburg line, Hans IV (1408) sold control of Laupenburg to Leopold III in 1386. It became part of the Further Austria and one of the four Habsburg Forest Cities on the Rhine. During the schism at the Council of Constance in 1415 the Antipope John XXIII fled to Laufenburg and withdrew his resignation.

After the Swiss conquest of the nearby Aargau, which was triggered by the schism, Laufenburg was the starting point of several campaigns against the Confederates. In retaliation, Bern, Solothurn and Basel besieged Laufenburg during the Old Zurich War in 1443. During the 15th Century, it was offered as collateral for a loan from Burgundy. As a result, it was briefly under Burgundy's control. During the Thirty Years War it was occupied for 13 years. In 1792 it was the base for the French Revolutionary Army. With the Lunéville peace of 1801 part of the Fricktal went to France and the rest went to the Helvetic Republic in 1802. The Rhine River was chosen as the border between the districts. The complicated division of community property took until 1829 to finish. Most of the city's facilities such as city hall, the market, the grain and salt house and two thirds of the population lived in the Swiss portion. While two-thirds of the territory, most of the commercial buildings, the common forest and the commons were in the German town.

== Geography ==
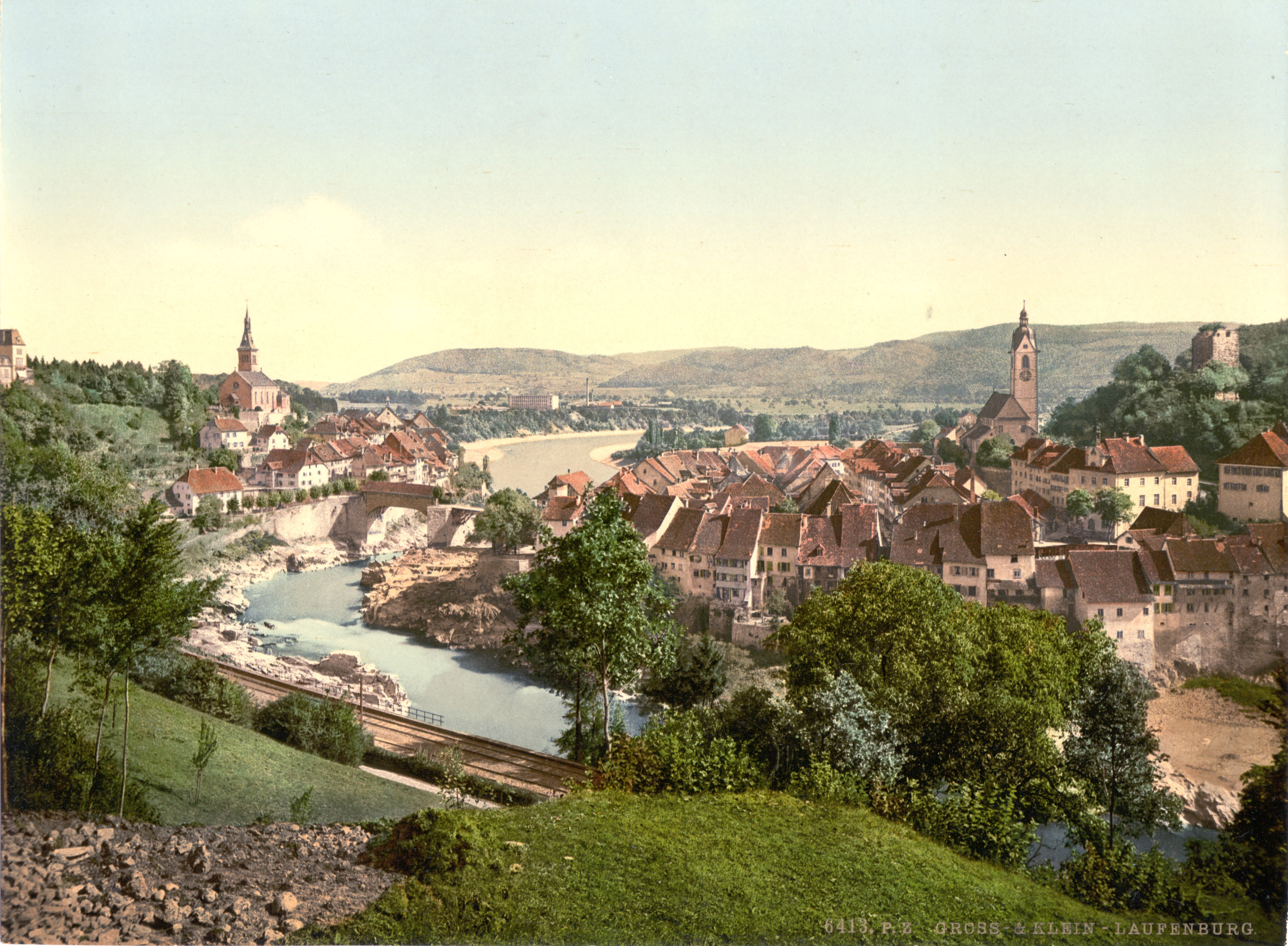
Rhine river at Laufenburg, from 1896

Aerial view (1958)

Laufenburg has an area, as of 2009, of 2.28 square kilometers (0.88 sq mi). Of this area, 0.37 km^{2} (0.14 sq mi) or 16.2% is used for agricultural purposes, while 0.8 km^{2} (0.31 sq mi) or 35.1% is forested. Of the rest of the land, 0.89 km^{2} (0.34 sq mi) or 39.0% is settled (buildings or roads), 0.18 km^{2} (0.069 sq mi) or 7.9% is either rivers or lakes.

Of the built up area, industrial buildings made up 8.3% of the total area while housing and buildings made up 15.4% and transportation infrastructure made up 9.2%. Power and water infrastructure as well as other special developed areas made up 3.1% of the area while parks, green belts and sports fields made up 3.1%. Out of the forested land, 33.3% of the total land area is heavily forested and 1.8% is covered with orchards or small clusters of trees. Of the agricultural land, 5.3% is used for growing crops and 11.0% is pastures. All the water in the municipality is in rivers and streams.

The municipality is the capital of the Laufenburg district. It consists of the left bank or Swiss section of the town of Laufenburg, with the German section of Laufenburg across the Rhine river.

== Coat of arms ==
The blazon of the municipal coat of arms is Or a Lion rampant Gules.

== Demographics ==
Laufenburg has a population (as of December 2020) of 3,659. As of June 2009, 37.7% of the population are foreign nationals. Over the last 10 years (1997–2007) the population has changed at a rate of 0.2%. Most of the population (as of 2000) speaks German (77.2%), with Italian being second most common ( 9.9%) and Albanian being third ( 4.3%).

The age distribution, as of 2008, in Laufenburg is; 225 children or 10.8% of the population are between 0 and 9 years old and 245 teenagers or 11.8% are between 10 and 19. Of the adult population, 275 people or 13.2% of the population are between 20 and 29 years old. 276 people or 13.3% are between 30 and 39, 340 people or 16.3% are between 40 and 49, and 279 people or 13.4% are between 50 and 59. The senior population distribution is 197 people or 9.5% of the population are between 60 and 69 years old, 149 people or 7.2% are between 70 and 79, there are 73 people or 3.5% who are between 80 and 89, and there are 21 people or 1.0% who are 90 and older.

As of 2000 the average number of residents per living room was 0.59 which is about equal to the cantonal average of 0.57 per room. In this case, a room is defined as space of a housing unit of at least 4 m^{2} (43 sq ft) as normal bedrooms, dining rooms, living rooms, kitchens and habitable cellars and attics. About 32.5% of the total households were owner occupied, or in other words did not pay rent (though they may have a mortgage or a rent-to-own agreement).

As of 2000, there were 89 homes with 1 or 2 persons in the household, 419 homes with 3 or 4 persons in the household, and 262 homes with 5 or more persons in the household. As of 2000, there were 792 private households (homes and apartments) in the municipality, and an average of 2.4 persons per household. In 2008 there were 259 single family homes (or 26.5% of the total) out of a total of 976 homes and apartments. There were a total of 27 empty apartments for a 2.8% vacancy rate. As of 2007, the construction rate of new housing units was 2 new units per 1000 residents.

In the 2007 federal election the most popular party was the CVP which received 27% of the vote. The next three most popular parties were the SVP (23.3%), the SP (17.1%) and the FDP (15.4%).

The entire Swiss population is generally well educated. In Laufenburg about 58.4% of the population (between age 25–64) have completed either non-mandatory upper secondary education or additional higher education (either university or a Fachhochschule). Of the school age population (in the 2008/2009 school year), there are 163 students attending primary school, there are 116 students attending secondary school, there are 153 students attending tertiary or university level schooling in the municipality.

The historical population is given in the following table:

Historical population
Year	Pop.	±%
1803	803	—
1850	699	−13.0%
1900	1,136	+62.5%
1950	1,603	+41.1%
2000	1,998	+24.6%

== Notable people ==
- Count Johann I. von Habsburg-Laufenburg-Rapperswil (1295/97 – 1337) the Count of Habsburg-Laufenburg
- Hans Müller von Bulgenbach (1490 – 1525 in Habsburg-Laufenburg) a peasant leader during the German Peasants' War
- Christoph Rehmann-Sutter (born 1959 in Laufenburg) a Swiss Bioethicist

== Heritage sites of national significance ==
The court house (German: Gerichtsgebäude) at Gerichtsgasse 86, Catholic parish church, the power plant of Laufenburg with surrounding village and the ruins of Laufenburg Castle together with the castle hill and ruins of the Roman Rhine fortification are listed as Swiss heritage sites of national significance. The old town of Laufenburg is designated as part of the Inventory of Swiss Heritage Sites.

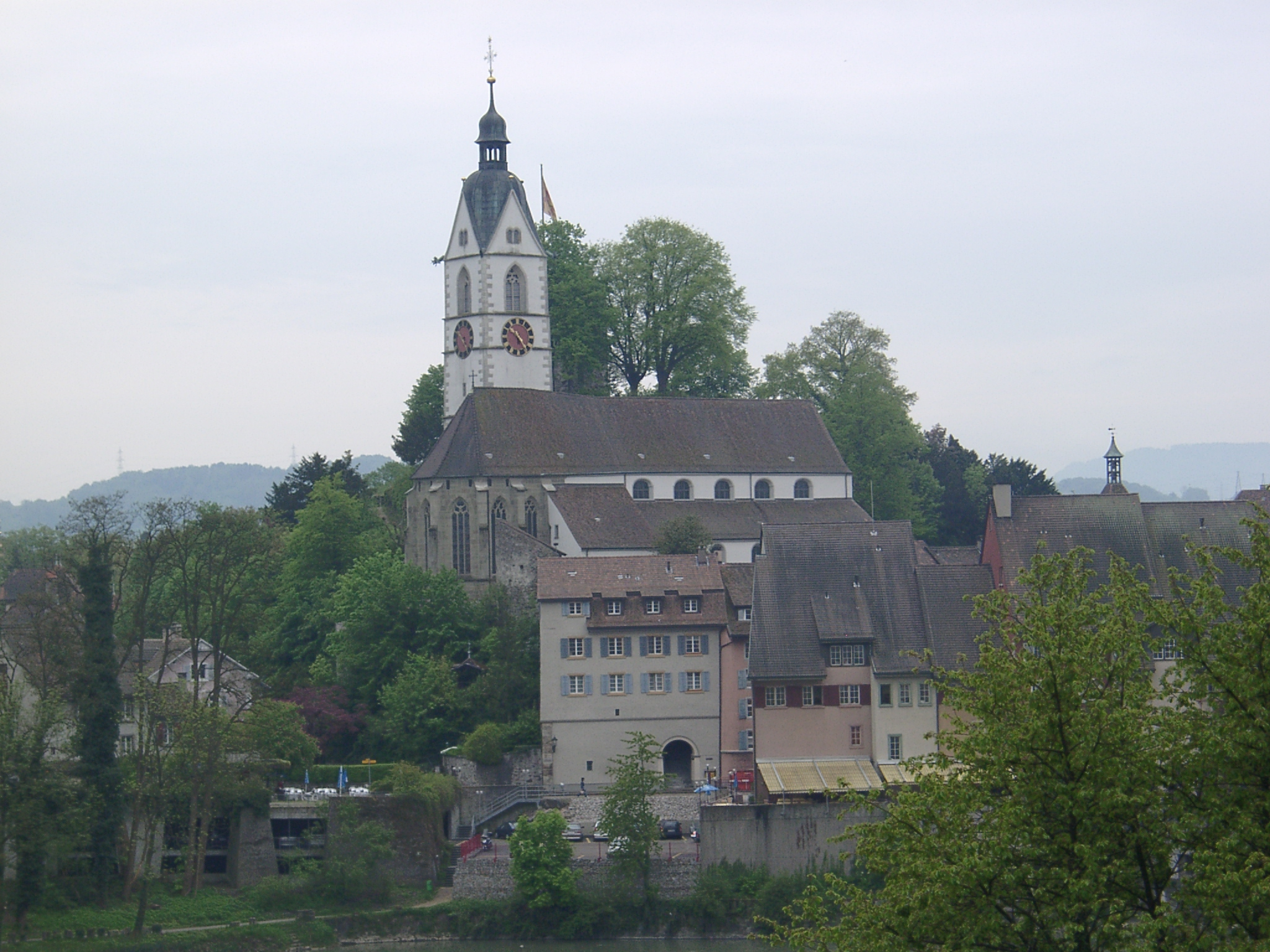
Laufenburg parish church

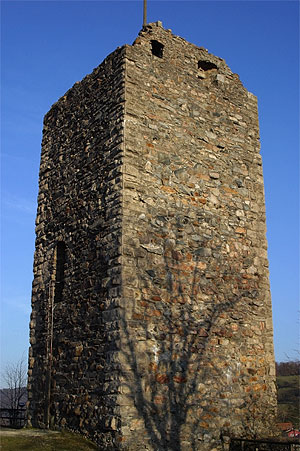
Ruins of the tower of Laufenburg castle

== Economy ==
As of 2007, Laufenburg had an unemployment rate of 2.77%. As of 2005, there were 64 people employed in the primary economic sector and about 6 businesses involved in this sector. 805 people are employed in the secondary sector and there are 24 businesses in this sector. 902 people are employed in the tertiary sector, with 97 businesses in this sector.

In 2000 there were 1,003 workers who lived in the municipality. Of these, 640 or about 63.8% of the residents worked outside Laufenburg while 828 people commuted into Laufenburg for work. There were a total of 1,191 jobs (of at least 6 hours per week) in the municipality. Of the working population, 16.3% used public transportation to get to work, and 42% used a private car.

In 2026, FlexBase selected Invinity Energy Systems to design a vanadium flow battery for its planned technology centre and AI data centre complex in Laufenburg.

== Religion ==
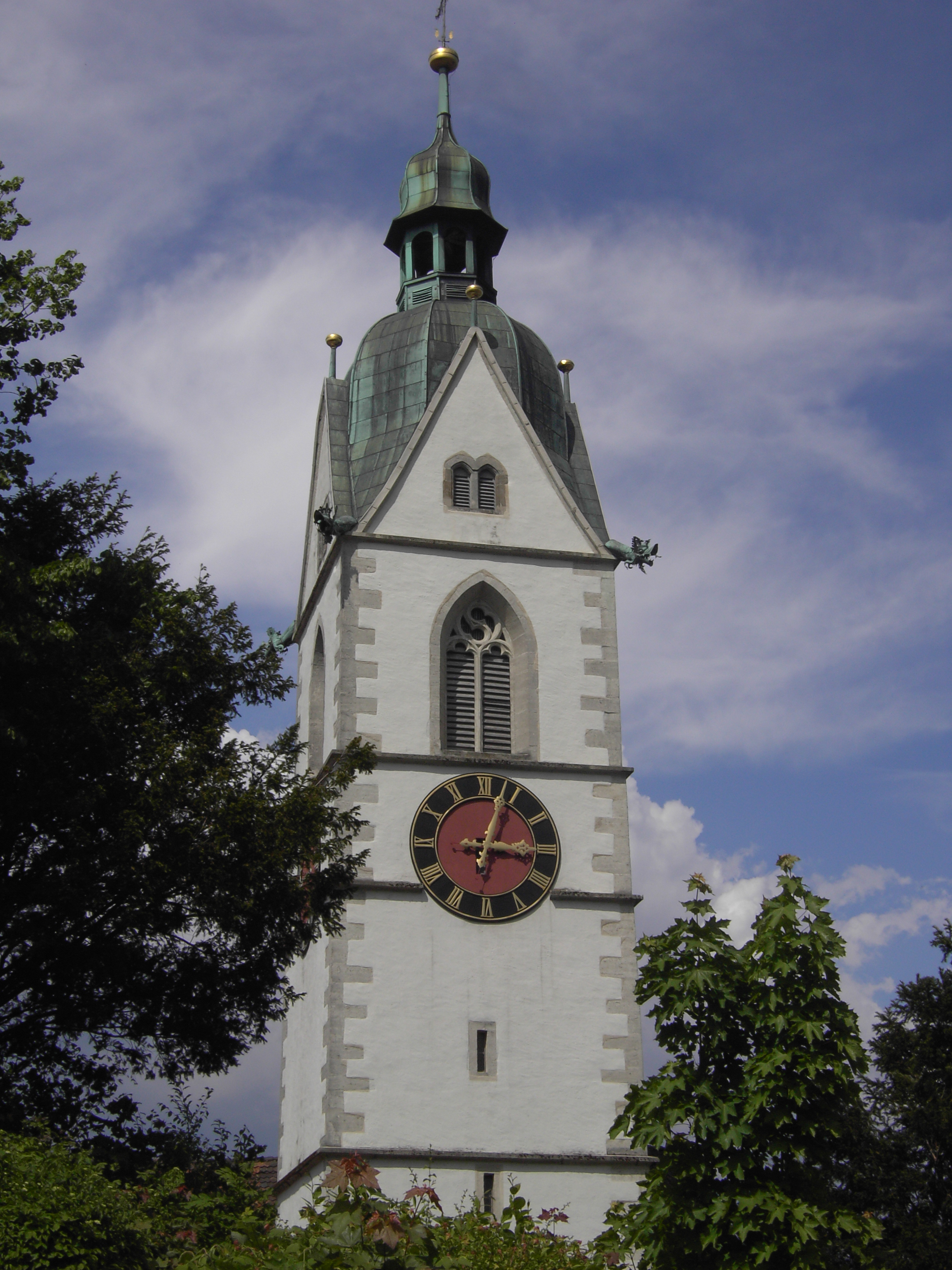
Church tower of the parish church

From the 2000 census, 1,252 or 59.7% were Roman Catholic, while 308 or 14.7% belonged to the Swiss Reformed Church. Of the rest of the population, there were 8 individuals (or about 0.38% of the population) who belonged to the Christian Catholic faith.

== Transport ==
Laufenburg is at the eastern end of the passenger portion of the Koblenz–Stein-Säckingen line and is served by local trains at Laufenburg.
