= Kaisten, Aargau =

Kaisten
- Municipality
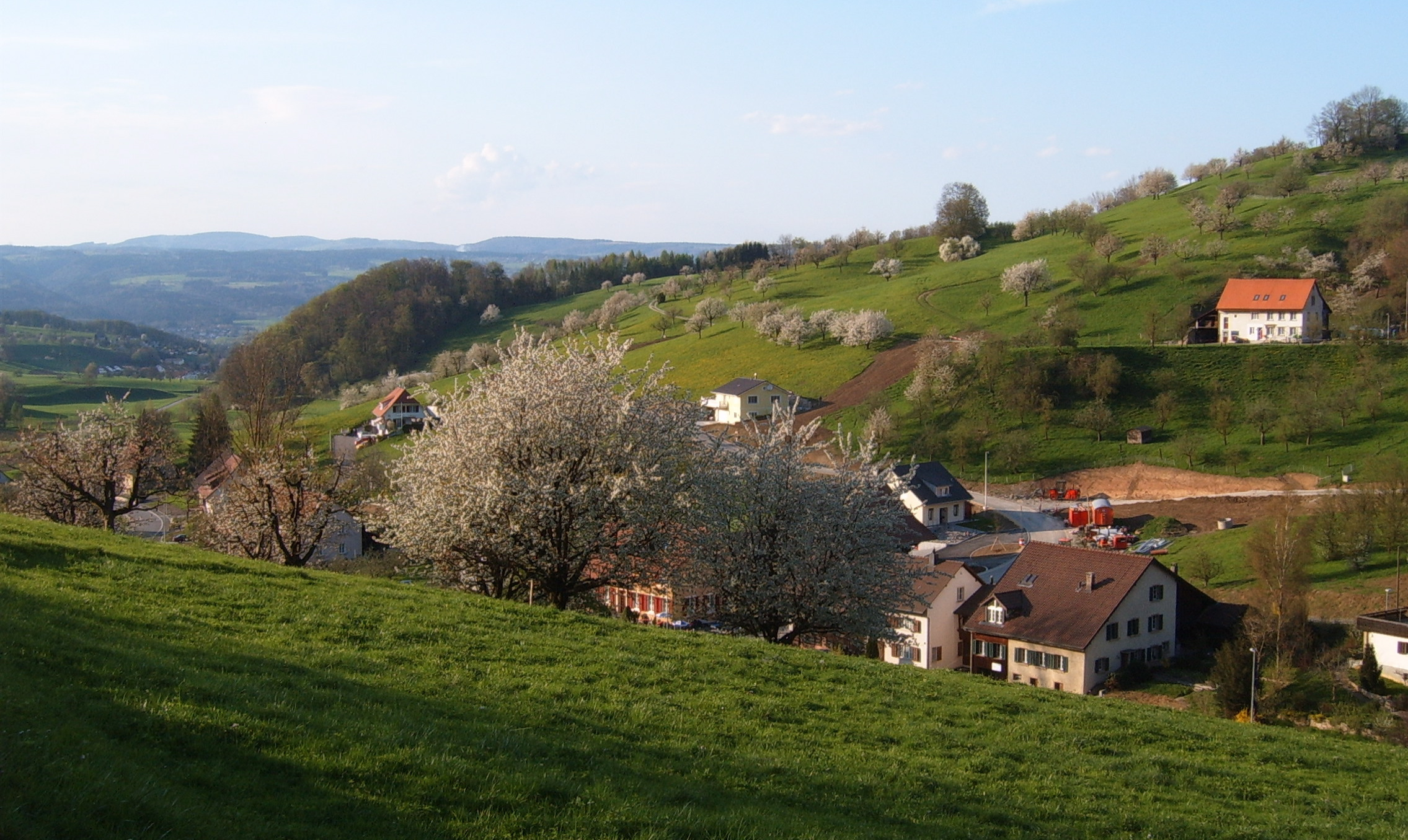
- Ittenthal

- Flag Coat of arms
- Location of Kaisten
- Location within Switzerland Location within Canton of Aargau
- Coordinates: 47°32′N 8°3′E
- Country: Switzerland
- Canton: Aargau
- District: Laufenburg

Area
  - Total: 14.19 km^{2} (5.48 sq mi)
- Elevation: 335 m (1,099 ft)

Population (December 2006)
  - Total: 2,257
  - Density: 159.1/km^{2} (412.0/sq mi)
- Time zone: UTC+01:00 (CET)
  - Summer (DST): UTC+02:00 (CEST)
- Postal code: 5082
- SFOS number: 4169
- ISO 3166 code: CH-AG
- Surrounded by: Eiken, Frick, Ittenthal, Laufenburg (DE-BW), Laufenburg, Murg (DE-BW), Oeschgen, Sisseln, Sulz
- Website: kaisten.ch

Kaisten is a municipality in the district of Laufenburg in the canton of Aargau in Switzerland. On 1 January 2010 the municipality of Ittenthal merged into the municipality of Kaisten.

== History ==
Archeological finds in Kaisten include a Bronze Age burial mound of the Hallstatt period, and a Roman watchtower and brick kiln. Kaisten is first mentioned in 1282 as Keiston. Ittenthal was first mentioned in 1297 as Utendal though this comes from a 15th-century copy of the original. Ittenthal was also mentioned in 1318 as ze Uttendal. Kaisten castle was built in the 12th and 13th centuries and was part of the territory of Säckingen. After the 13th century, it was part of the Austrian Habsburgs land, until 1797. After the annexation of the Fricktal by the Canton of Aargau in the 1803 Act of Mediation it became a municipality.

The Church of St. Michael, founded by Säckingen, was first mentioned in 1443. Until 1804 it was a filial church of the Laufenburg church. The present building dates from 1717. Before 1812 Kaisten and Ittenthal formed a parish.

Economically, vineyards played an important role into the mid-19th century. Throughout the Middle Ages and the early modern age, smelting of iron was also important. In the 20th century, a brick factory was built in Kaisten. Until 1960 Kaisten was mostly a farming village, but it then moved to the chemicals industry.

== Geography ==
Aerial view (1953)

Kaisten has an area, as of 2009, of 14.19 square kilometers (5.48 sq mi). Of this area, 5.86 km^{2} (2.26 sq mi) or 41.3% is used for agricultural purposes, while 6.38 km^{2} (2.46 sq mi) or 45.0% is forested. Of the rest of the land, 1.62 km^{2} (0.63 sq mi) or 11.4% is settled (buildings or roads), 0.3 km^{2} (0.12 sq mi) or 2.1% is either rivers or lakes and 0.02 km^{2} (4.9 acres) or 0.1% is unproductive land.

Of the built up area, industrial buildings made up 1.3% of the total area while housing and buildings made up 4.4% and transportation infrastructure made up 3.5%. Power and water infrastructure as well as other special developed areas made up 1.8% of the area Out of the forested land, 43.0% of the total land area is heavily forested and 2.0% is covered with orchards or small clusters of trees. Of the agricultural land, 24.5% is used for growing crops and 15.2% is pastures, while 1.6% is used for orchards or vine crops. All the water in the municipality is in rivers and streams.

The municipality is located in the Laufenburg district in the upper Fricktal (Frick river valley). It consists of the haufendorf village (an irregular, unplanned and quite closely packed village, built around a central square) of Kaisten and the hamlets of Oberkaisten as well as the former municipality of Ittenthal.

== Coat of arms ==
The blazon of the municipal coat of arms is Or a Vine Leaf Gules slipped.

== Demographics ==
Kaisten has a population (as of December 2020) of 2,754 As of June 2009, 14.7% of the population are foreign nationals. Over the last 10 years (1997–2007) the population has changed at a rate of 14.1%. Most of the population (as of 2000) speaks German (93.0%), with Italian being second most common ( 1.5%) and Albanian being third ( 1.5%).

The age distribution, as of 2008, in Kaisten is; 248 children or 10.8% of the population are between 0 and 9 years old and 322 teenagers or 14.0% are between 10 and 19. Of the adult population, 232 people or 10.1% of the population are between 20 and 29 years old. 310 people or 13.5% are between 30 and 39, 427 people or 18.6% are between 40 and 49, and 296 people or 12.9% are between 50 and 59. The senior population distribution is 243 people or 10.6% of the population are between 60 and 69 years old, 155 people or 6.7% are between 70 and 79, there are 57 people or 2.5% who are between 80 and 89, and there are 10 people or 0.4% who are 90 and older.

As of 2000 the average number of residents per living room was 0.57, which is about equal to the cantonal average of 0.57 per room. In this case, a room is defined as space of a housing unit of at least 4 m^{2} (43 sq ft) as normal bedrooms, dining rooms, living rooms, kitchens and habitable cellars and attics. About 62% of the total households were owner occupied, or in other words did not pay rent (though they may have a mortgage or a rent-to-own agreement).

As of 2000, there were 34 homes with 1 or 2 persons in the household, 288 homes with 3 or 4 persons in the household, and 412 homes with 5 or more persons in the household. As of 2000, there were 771 private households (homes and apartments) in the municipality, and an average of 2.6 persons per household. In 2008 there were 471 single family homes (or 54.0% of the total) out of a total of 872 homes and apartments. There were a total of 8 empty apartments for a 0.9% vacancy rate. As of 2007, the construction rate of new housing units was 0 new units per 1000 residents.

In the 2007 federal election the most popular party was the SVP which received 27.7% of the vote. The next three most popular parties were the CVP (23.9%), the SP (19.7%) and the FDP (14.6%).

The entire Swiss population is generally well educated. In Kaisten about 73% of the population (between age 25–64) have completed either non-mandatory upper secondary education or additional higher education (either university or a Fachhochschule). Of the school age population (in the 2008/2009 school year), there are 188 students attending primary school, there are 117 students attending secondary school in the municipality.

The historical population is given in the following table:

year	population (Kaisten)	population (Ittenthal)
1803	875	171
1850	1,189	265
1900	994	217
1950	1,160	221
2000	2,054	222

== Sights ==
The village of Ittenthal is designated as part of the Inventory of Swiss Heritage Sites.

== Economy ==
As of 2007, Kaisten had an unemployment rate of 1.96%. As of 2005, there were 94 people employed in the primary economic sector and about 30 businesses involved in this sector. 516 people are employed in the secondary sector and there are 19 businesses in this sector. 176 people are employed in the tertiary sector, with 45 businesses in this sector.

In 2000 there were 1,015 workers who lived in the municipality. Of these, 724 or about 71.3% of the residents worked outside Kaisten while 344 people commuted into the municipality for work. There were a total of 635 jobs (of at least 6 hours per week) in the municipality. Of the working population, 16.7% used public transportation to get to work, and 48% used a private car.

== Religion ==
From the 2000 census, 1,298 or 63.2% were Roman Catholic, while 395 or 19.2% belonged to the Swiss Reformed Church. Of the rest of the population, there were 10 individuals (or about 0.49% of the population) who belonged to the Christian Catholic faith.
