= Münchwilen, Aargau =

- Municipality
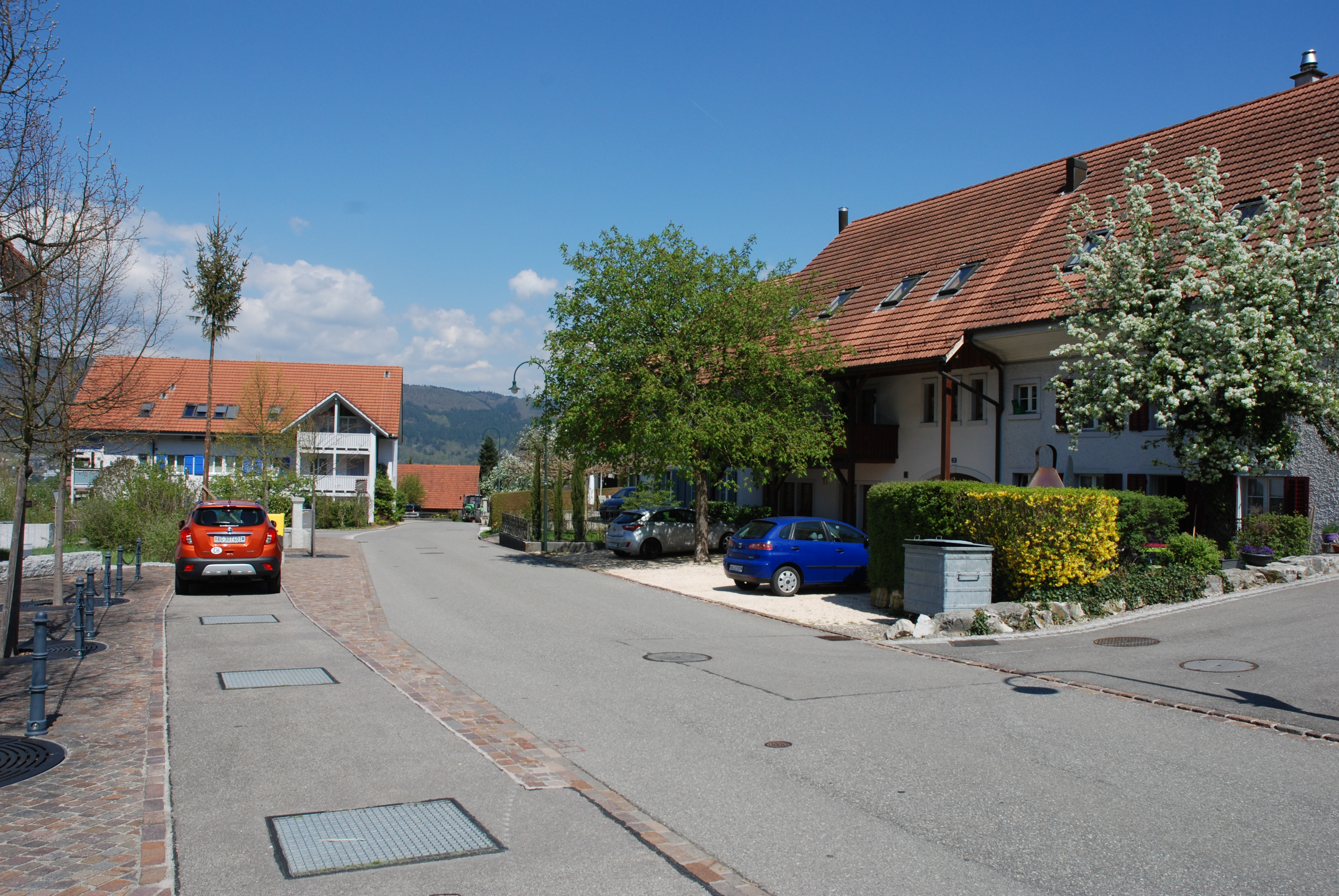

- Flag Coat of arms
- Location of Münchwilen, Aargau
- Location within Switzerland Location within Canton of Aargau
- Coordinates: 47°32′N 7°58′E
- Country: Switzerland
- Canton: Aargau
- District: Laufenburg

Area
  - Total: 2.46 km^{2} (0.95 sq mi)
- Elevation: 342 m (1,122 ft)

Population (December 2006)
  - Total: 668
  - Density: 272/km^{2} (703/sq mi)
- Time zone: UTC+01:00 (CET)
  - Summer (DST): UTC+02:00 (CEST)
- Postal code: 4333
- SFOS number: 4172
- ISO 3166 code: CH-AG
- Surrounded by: Eiken, Obermumpf, Schupfart, Sisseln, Stein
- Website: muenchwilen-ag.ch

Münchwilen is a municipality in the district of Laufenburg in the canton of Aargau in Switzerland.

== History ==
In the first Century AD there was a villa rustica in what is now Münchwilen. The modern village of Münchwilen is first mentioned around 1303-08 as Munchwille. It grew out of the farming estate Stein which belonged to Säckingen Abbey. During the Middle Ages the low justice right went the local Habsburg vassal, and the village became part of the bailiwick of Eiken. In 1802 it was part of the Canton of Fricktal, then in 1803 it became part of the Canton of Aargau when the Fricktal was absorbed into Aargau.

Aerial view from 3000 m by Walter Mittelholzer (1922)

Since the Middle Ages, the village church has belonged to the Eiken parish. The Chapel of St. Ursula, which was partly built from Roman stones, was originally owned by the monastery of St. Martin in Rheinfelden and until 1791 it was a small hermitage.

Until the middle of the 20th Century the major economic activity in Münchwilen was agriculture. By World War I, many residents went to the German city of Säckingen to go to market or to work in the factory. Since 1945, Münchwilen has had good connections with outside trade and industry, which include the train station at Stein and the A3 motorway onramp at Eiken.

== Geography ==
Münchwilen has an area, as of 2009, of 2.46 square kilometers (0.95 sq mi). Of this area, 0.99 km^{2} (0.38 sq mi) or 40.2% is used for agricultural purposes, while 0.78 km^{2} (0.30 sq mi) or 31.7% is forested. Of the rest of the land, 0.7 km^{2} (0.27 sq mi) or 28.5% is settled (buildings or roads), 0.01 km^{2} (2.5 acres) or 0.4% is either rivers or lakes.

Of the built up area, industrial buildings made up 6.1% of the total area while housing and buildings made up 9.8% and transportation infrastructure made up 6.9%. Power and water infrastructure as well as other special developed areas made up 4.1% of the area while parks, green belts and sports fields made up 1.6%. Out of the forested land, 29.7% of the total land area is heavily forested and 2.0% is covered with orchards or small clusters of trees. Of the agricultural land, 31.7% is used for growing crops and 6.9% is pastures, while 1.6% is used for orchards or vine crops. All the water in the municipality is in rivers and streams.

The municipality is located in the Laufenburg district, on a terrace between Sisslerfeld and the Jura Mountains. It consists of the linear village of Münchwilen.

== Coat of arms ==
The blazon of the municipal coat of arms is Azure a Monk passant clad and wearing hat and sandals Marron and holding a pilgrim stick Argent. The monk (German: Mönch) is an example of canting.

== Demographics ==
Münchwilen has a population (as of December 2020) of 1,007. As of June 2009, 14.5% of the population are foreign nationals. Over the last 10 years (1997–2007) the population has changed at a rate of 19.6%. Most of the population (as of 2000) speaks German (97.1%), with Italian being second most common ( 1.0%) and Serbo-Croatian being third ( 0.5%).

The age distribution, as of 2008, in Münchwilen is; 68 children or 9.5% of the population are between 0 and 9 years old and 66 teenagers or 9.2% are between 10 and 19. Of the adult population, 73 people or 10.2% of the population are between 20 and 29 years old. 101 people or 14.1% are between 30 and 39, 129 people or 18.0% are between 40 and 49, and 89 people or 12.4% are between 50 and 59. The senior population distribution is 108 people or 15.1% of the population are between 60 and 69 years old, 51 people or 7.1% are between 70 and 79, there are 29 people or 4.1% who are between 80 and 89, and there are 2 people or 0.3% who are 90 and older.

As of 2000 the average number of residents per living room was 0.49 which is fewer people per room than the cantonal average of 0.57 per room. In this case, a room is defined as space of a housing unit of at least 4 m^{2} (43 sq ft) as normal bedrooms, dining rooms, living rooms, kitchens and habitable cellars and attics. About 73.8% of the total households were owner occupied, or in other words did not pay rent (though they may have a mortgage or a rent-to-own agreement).

As of 2000, there were 12 homes with 1 or 2 persons in the household, 114 homes with 3 or 4 persons in the household, and 118 homes with 5 or more persons in the household. As of 2000, there were 254 private households (homes and apartments) in the municipality, and an average of 2.3 persons per household. In 2008 there were 169 single family homes (or 52.6% of the total) out of a total of 321 homes and apartments. There were a total of 4 empty apartments for a 1.2% vacancy rate. As of 2007, the construction rate of new housing units was 23 new units per 1000 residents.

In the 2007 federal election the most popular party was the SVP which received 34.5% of the vote. The next three most popular parties were the SP (22%), the FDP (16.5%) and the CVP (12.1%).

In Münchwilen about 75.2% of the population (between age 25–64) have completed either non-mandatory upper secondary education or additional higher education (either university or a Fachhochschule). Of the school age population (in the 2008/2009 school year), there are 47 students attending primary school in the municipality.

The historical population is given in the following table:

Historical population
Year	Pop.	±%
1768	105	—
1850	227	+116.2%
1900	246	+8.4%
1950	295	+19.9%
2000	587	+99.0%

== Economy ==
As of 2007, Münchwilen had an unemployment rate of 2%. As of 2005, there were 5 people employed in the primary economic sector and about 2 businesses involved in this sector. 346 people are employed in the secondary sector and there are 7 businesses in this sector. 69 people are employed in the tertiary sector, with 27 businesses in this sector.

In 2000 there were 278 workers who lived in the municipality. Of these, 230 or about 82.7% of the residents worked outside Münchwilen while 280 people commuted into the municipality for work. There were a total of 328 jobs (of at least 6 hours per week) in the municipality. Of the working population, 15.2% used public transportation to get to work, and 60.8% used a private car.

== Religion ==
From the 2000 census, 347 or 59.1% were Roman Catholic, while 169 or 28.8% belonged to the Swiss Reformed Church. Of the rest of the population, there were 8 individuals (or about 1.36% of the population) who belonged to the Christian Catholic faith.
