= Christoph Rehmann-Sutter =

Philosopher and bioethicist

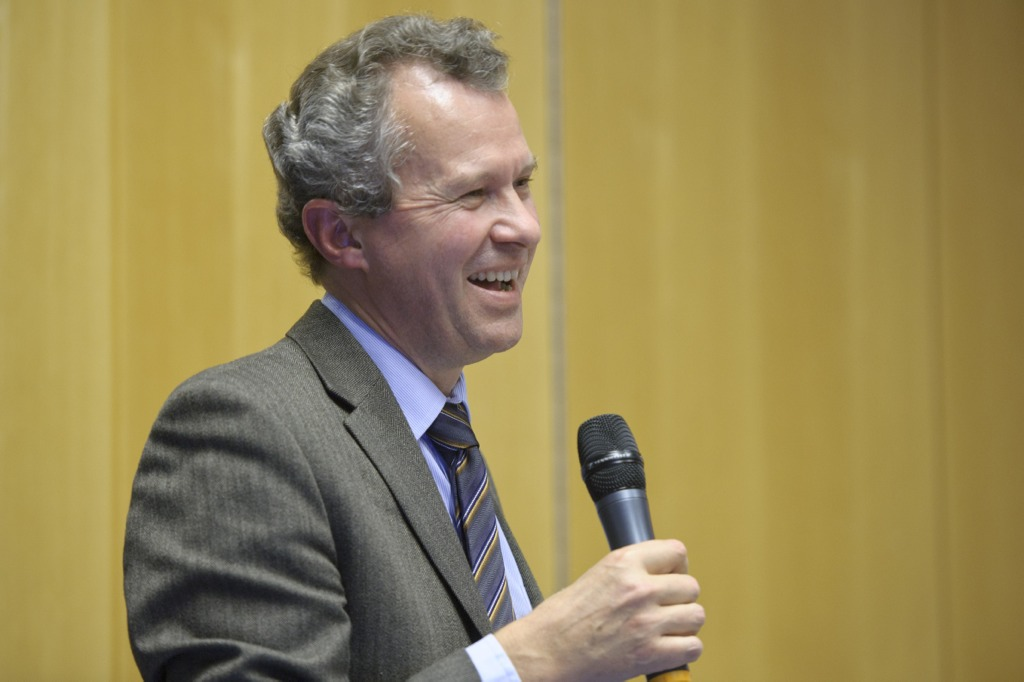
Christoph Rehmann-Sutter

Christoph Rehmann-Sutter (born 26 February 1959 in Laufenburg) is a philosopher and bioethicist. He is holding a professorship for theory and ethics in biosciences at the Institute for History of Medicine and Science Studies at the University of Lübeck in Germany.

== Life and professional Career ==
Christoph Rehmann-Sutter is the son of the sculptor Erwin Rehmann and the teacher Margrit Rehmann(-Hüsser). He was raised in Laufenburg (Switzerland) and went to school in Laufenburg and Aarau. He received a diploma in molecular biology from the Biocenter at the University of Basel in 1984. This was followed by a second training in philosophy and sociology (licentiate 1988) at the Universities of Basel and Freiburg im Breisgau.

His doctoral degree in philosophy he received 1995 from the Technical University of Darmstadt with a book on what biologists ‘do’ (in practical and ethical terms) when they describe life (Leben Beschreiben. Über Handlungszusammenhänge in der Biologie). Supervisor was Prof. Gernot Böhme. During this time, he worked as a lecturer for environmental philosophy and bioethics in the research group of Werner Arber at the University of Basel. In 1996 he founded the Unit for Ethics in the Biosciences at the University of Basel, in collaboration with the fellow bioethicist Jackie Leach Scully . For his work on philosophical foundations of bioethics he received his venia legendi (Habilitation) for philosophy at the University of Basel in 2000 (Lebendiges Selbst - lebendige Andere. Ethik aus biomedizinischen und ökologischen Kontexten).

During the academic year 1997/1998 he was a research fellow in the Department of Environmental Science, Policy and Management (ESPM) at the University of California, Berkeley. After that, he was appointed Assistant Professor of Ethics in the Biosciences and Biotechnology at the University of Basel. In 2001, he was elected by the Swiss government president of the Swiss National Advisory Commission on Biomedical Ethics, which was a public advisory role for the parliament and the government. He held this office until 2009 when he accepted a professorship for Theory and Ethics in the Biosciences in Lübeck.

Guest professorships at:

- the Policy, Ethics and Life Sciences (PEALS) Research Centre, Newcastle University (2008)
- the London School of Economics and Political Science (LSE, 2009-2011)
- the Department of Global Health and Social Medicine at the King’s College London (2012–present)

Rehmann-Sutter is married to the theologian Luzia Sutter Rehmann.

== Research interests ==
- Hermeneutic approaches to philosophical ethics, interdisciplinary and multiperspective bioethics with qualitative social research
- governance of medicine and biotechnology, ethics committees
- Phenomenology of livingness
- Techno-ecological risks, with a focus on climate crisis
- Biomedical research ethics
- Ethics of Genetics and genomics
- Ethics of Reproductive medicine and stem cell research
- Decision-making at the end of life

== Projects ==
- Democracy and techno-ecological risks (Original title: „Demokratie und technisch-ökologische Risiken“; in cooperation with Andres Klein, Hansjörg Seiler and Adrian Vatter; Stiftung Mensch-Gesellschaft-Umwelt, University of Basel 1994-1996)
- Genome and Organism. Philosophical Interpretations of the developmental Biology (in cooperation with Eva Neumann-Held; Stiftung Mensch-Gesellschaft-Umwelt, University of Basel 1997-2000)
- Perceptions of Healing Needs: Somatic gene therapy, disability and identity (in cooperation with Jackie Leach Scully; Swiss National Science Foundation 1998-2000)
- Time as a Contextual Element in Ethical Decision Making in the Field of Genetic Diagnostics (in cooperation with Jackie Leach Scully and Rouven Porz; Swiss National Science Foundation 2002-2005)
- BIONET – Ethical Governance of Biological and Biomedical Research: Chinese-European Co-operation (Chairman of the European-Chinese Expert Group on the Ethical Governance of Research in the Life Sciences and Biomedicine; coordinated by Nikolas Rose, EU-FP 6 2006-2009)
- Ethical decisions about the fate of embryos: the views and approaches of couples undergoing IVF (in cooperation with Jackie Leach Scully and Rouven Porz; Swiss National Science Foundation 2005-2008)
- Wishes to die in palliative care patients (in cooperation with Heike Gudat, Kathrin Ohnsorge and Nina Streeck; diverse grants, including Oncosuisse and Swiss National Science Foundation 2006-2016)
- The Well-being of the child in conflict. Stem cell transplantation between siblings (in cooperation with Christina Schües, Martina Jürgensen and Madeleine Herzog; Fritz Thyssen Stiftung and Deutsches Bundesministerium für Bildung und Forschung 2011-2019)
- Treatment decisions with older cancer patients (in cooperation with Frank Wörler and Christina Schües, PI: Alexander Katalinic; Innovationsfonds 2017-2020)
- Prenatal Genetics in Germany and Israel: Meanings and Practices (in cooperation with Aviad Raz, Christina Schües, Yael Hashiloni-Dolev, Stefan Reinsch, Hannes Foth and Tamar Nov Klaiman; Deutsche Forschungsgemeinschaft 2017-2020)

== Research interests ==
- Hermeneutic philosophical approaches to ethics, interdisciplinary and pluriperspective bioethics, with qualitative social research and cultural approaches
- Transnational bioethics
- Governance in medicine and biotechnologies, ethics committees
- Techno-ecological risks
- Biomedical research ethics
- Genetics and genomics
- Reproductive medicine and stem cell research
- Decision-making at the end of life

== Selected English publications ==
Books

Genetic Transparency? Ethical and Social Implications of Next Generation Genomics and Genetic Medicine. Gemeinsam mit Malte Dreier und Jeanette Erdmann. Amsterdam: Brill Rodopi 2016, ISBN 978-9004306684

The Patient’s Wish to Die. Research, Ethics, and Palliative Care. Gemeinsam mit Heike Gudat und Kathrin Ohnsorge. Oxford: Oxford University Press 2015, ISBN 978-0198713982

The Human Enhancement Debate and Disability. New Bodies for a Better Life. Gemeinsam mit Miriam Eilers und Katrin Grüber. Basingstoke: Palgrave Macmillan 2014, ISBN 978-1-137-40553-1

Bioethics in Cultural Contexts. Reflections on Methods and Finitude. Gemeinsam mit Marcus Düwell und Dietmar Mieth. Dordrecht: Springer 2006, ISBN 978-1-4020-4241-6

Genes in Development. Re-reading the molecular paradigm. Gemeinsam mit Eva M. Neumann-Held. Durham: Duke University Press 2006, ISBN 978-0822336679
