= Olsberg, Aargau =

Olsberg
- Municipality
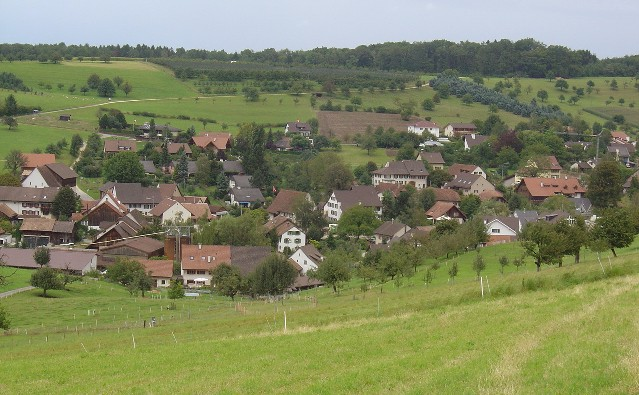
- Olsberg village

- Flag Coat of arms
- Location of Olsberg
- Location within Switzerland Location within Canton of Aargau
- Coordinates: 47°31′N 7°47′E
- Country: Switzerland
- Canton: Aargau
- District: Rheinfelden

Area
  - Total: 4.62 km^{2} (1.78 sq mi)
- Elevation: 377 m (1,237 ft)

Population (December 2005)
  - Total: 363
  - Density: 78.6/km^{2} (203/sq mi)
- Time zone: UTC+01:00 (CET)
  - Summer (DST): UTC+02:00 (CEST)
- Postal code: 4305
- SFOS number: 4257
- ISO 3166 code: CH-AG
- Surrounded by: Arisdorf (BL), Giebenach (BL), Kaiseraugst, Magden, Rheinfelden
- Twin towns: Olsberg (Germany)
- Website: www.olsberg.ch

Olsberg (Swiss Standard German pronunciation: [ˈɔlsbɛrɡ]; Swiss German: Olschprg) is a municipality in the district of Rheinfelden in the canton of Aargau in Switzerland.

== History ==
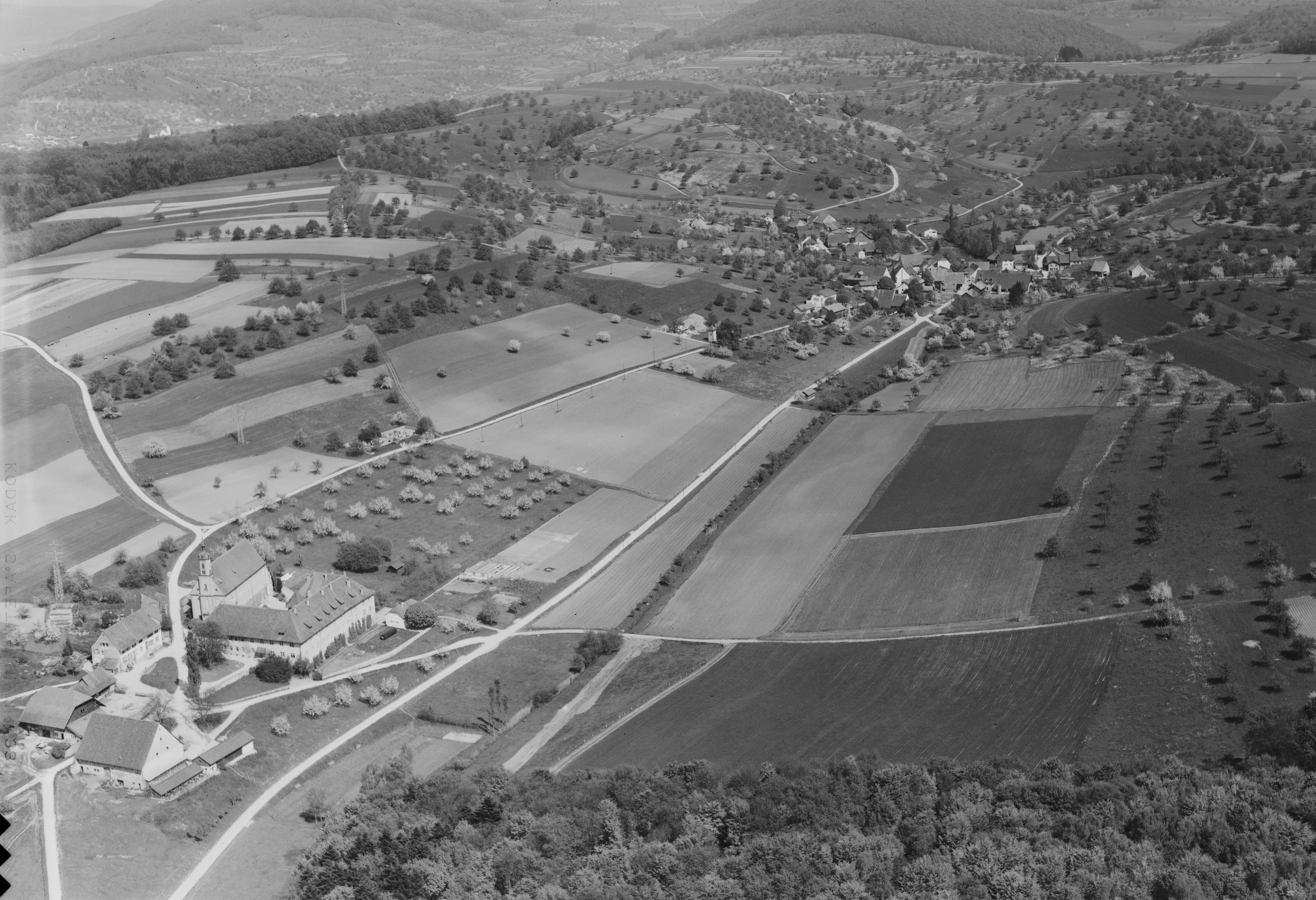
Aerial view (1965)

During the Neolithic era there was a small settlement near Olsberg. There was also a Roman farm in the area during the 1st century AD. The modern village of Olsberg is first mentioned in 1236 as Olsperg. The original settlement grew out from the courtyard of the convent. Until 1790, the convent held the low justice rights as well as the ownership of the land. With some interruptions, the part of Olsberg to the right of the Violenbach stream belonged to the Austrian district of Rheinfelden from 1330 until 1797. After 1797 it was a French protectorate and then went with the rest of the Fricktal to the newly formed Canton of Aargau in 1803. The left hand side of the stream belonged to the city of Basel from 1461 and later to Canton of Basel-Country (and now forms part of the municipality of Arisdorf).

The Abbey Church was renovated between 1670 and 1707. It was originally a branch church of the parish church in Kaiseraugst. After 1786 it became the parish church of its own parish. In 1872 it became the first Christian Catholic parish church in Switzerland.

== Geography ==
Olsberg has an area, as of 2009, of 4.62 square kilometers (1.78 sq mi). Of this area, 1.58 km^{2} (0.61 sq mi) or 34.2% is used for agricultural purposes, while 2.77 km^{2} (1.07 sq mi) or 60.0% is forested. Of the rest of the land, 0.25 km^{2} (0.097 sq mi) or 5.4% is settled (buildings or roads), 0.01 km^{2} (2.5 acres) or 0.2% is either rivers or lakes.

Of the built up area, housing and buildings made up 2.6% and transportation infrastructure made up 2.4%. Out of the forested land, all of the forested land area is covered with heavy forests. Of the agricultural land, 10.6% is used for growing crops and 18.2% is pastures, while 5.4% is used for orchards or vine crops. All the water in the municipality is in rivers and streams.

The municipality is located in the Rheinfelden district, in the lower Fricktal (Frick river valley). In 1882 Olsberg merged with Arisdorf.

== Coat of arms ==
The blazon of the municipal coat of arms is Vert a Rose Argent and a Chief counter-compony Gules and Argent.

== Demographics ==
Olsberg has a population (as of December 2020) of 356 As of June 2009, 7.7% of the population are foreign nationals. Over the last 10 years (1997–2007) the population has changed at a rate of 7.6%. Most of the population (as of 2000) speaks German(96.3%), with French being second most common ( 1.6%) and Italian being third ( 0.5%).

The age distribution, as of 2008, in Olsberg is; 23 children or 6.3% of the population are between 0 and 9 years old and 37 teenagers or 10.2% are between 10 and 19. Of the adult population, 31 people or 8.5% of the population are between 20 and 29 years old. 48 people or 13.2% are between 30 and 39, 57 people or 15.7% are between 40 and 49, and 62 people or 17.1% are between 50 and 59. The senior population distribution is 77 people or 21.2% of the population are between 60 and 69 years old, 17 people or 4.7% are between 70 and 79, there are 8 people or 2.2% who are between 80 and 89, and there are 3 people or 0.8% who are 90 and older.

As of 2000 the average number of residents per living room was 0.54 which is about equal to the cantonal average of 0.57 per room. In this case, a room is defined as space of a housing unit of at least 4 m^{2} (43 sq ft) as normal bedrooms, dining rooms, living rooms, kitchens and habitable cellars and attics. About 76.7% of the total households were owner occupied, or in other words did not pay rent (though they may have a mortgage or a rent-to-own agreement).

As of 2000, there were 8 homes with 1 or 2 persons in the household, 48 homes with 3 or 4 persons in the household, and 73 homes with 5 or more persons in the household. As of 2000, there were 134 private households (homes and apartments) in the municipality, and an average of 2.6 persons per household. In 2008 there were 92 single family homes (or 56.4% of the total) out of a total of 163 homes and apartments. There were a total of 0 empty apartments for a 0.0% vacancy rate. As of 2007, the construction rate of new housing units was 5.6 new units per 1000 residents.

In the 2007 federal election the most popular party was the SVP which received 30.14% of the vote. The next three most popular parties were the SP (28.61%), the FDP (13.29%) and the CVP (10.72%). In the federal election, a total of 133 votes were cast, and the voter turnout was 48.0%.

The historical population is given in the following table:

Historical population
Year	Pop.	±%
1768	128	—
1850	248	+93.8%
1900	259	+4.4%
1950	230	−11.2%
1990	300	+30.4%
2000	375	+25.0%

== Heritage sites of national significance ==
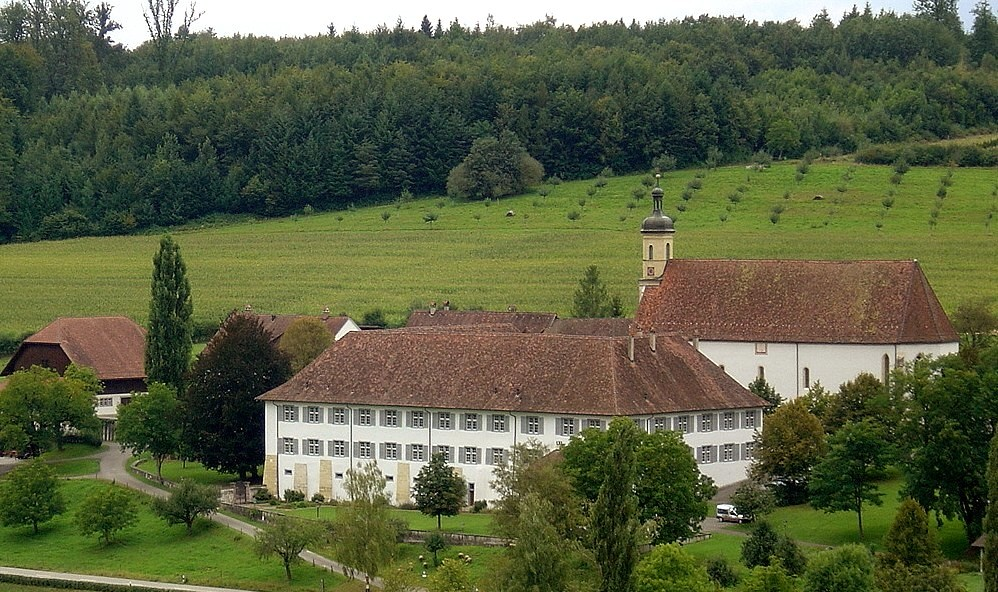
Former convent building

The former Cistercian convent, church and outbuildings are listed as a Swiss heritage site of national significance.

== Economy ==
As of 2007, Olsberg had an unemployment rate of 0.75%. As of 2005, there were 46 people employed in the primary economic sector and about 16 businesses involved in this sector. people are employed in the secondary sector and there are businesses in this sector. 52 people are employed in the tertiary sector, with 10 businesses in this sector.

In 2000 there were 200 workers who lived in the municipality. Of these, 149 or about 74.5% of the residents worked outside Olsberg while 74 people commuted into the municipality for work. There were a total of 125 jobs (of at least 6 hours per week) in the municipality. Of the working population, 11.1% used public transportation to get to work, and 54.1% used a private car.

== Religion ==
From the 2000 census, 86 or 22.9% were Roman Catholic, while 166 or 44.3% belonged to the Swiss Reformed Church. Of the rest of the population, there were 41 individuals (or about 10.93% of the population) who belonged to the Christian Catholic faith.

== Education ==
In Olsberg about 90.7% of the population (between ages 25 and 64) have completed either non-mandatory upper secondary education or additional higher education (either university or a Fachhochschule). Of the school age population (in the 2008/2009 school year), there are 26 students attending primary school in the municipality.

Olsberg is home to the Schul-u.Gde.Bibliothek Olsberg (school and municipal library of Olsberg).

== Culture ==
The cellist Sol Gabetta has since 2005 organized a chamber music festival in Olsberg called Solsberg.
