= List of mayors of Rheinfelden =

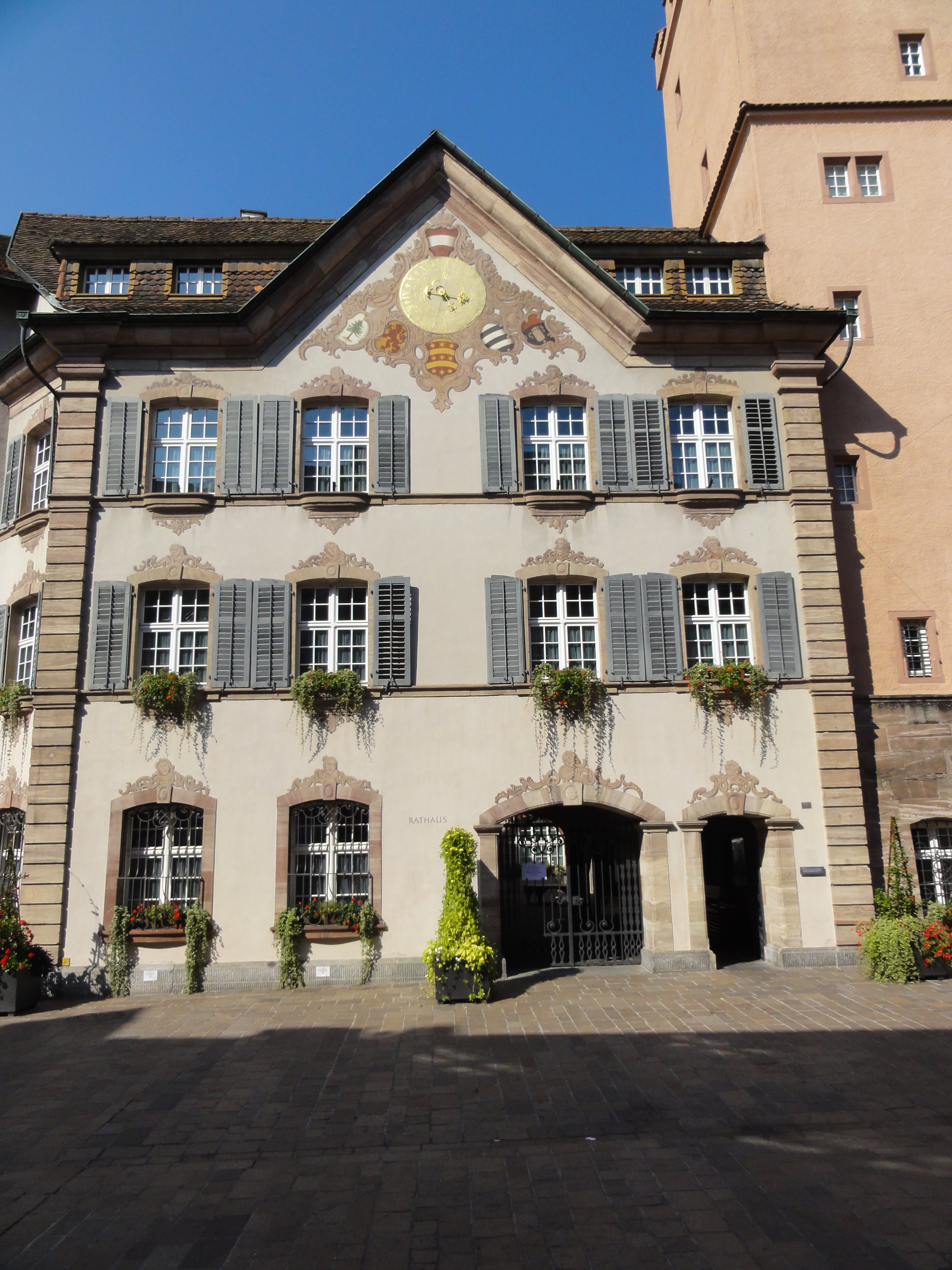
Rathaus Rheinfelden

Coat of arms of Rheinfelden

This is a list of mayors of Rheinfelden, Switzerland. The mayor (Stadtammann) of Rheinfelden chairs the five-member council (Gemeinderat).

Mayor (Stadtammann) of Rheinfelden
Term	Mayor	Lifespan	Party	Notes
1897–1928	Friedrich Brunner	(1850–1928)	FDP/PRD	
1929–1965	Bruno Beetschen	(1897–1989)	FDP/PRD	
1966–1987	Richard Molinari	(1916-2003)		
1987–2001	Hansruedi Schnyder	(1934-2003)	SVP/UDC	
2001–2005	Urs Felber			
2006–present	Franco Mazzi	(born 1959)	FDP/PRD	
