= Rheinfelden (Aargau) =

- Municipality
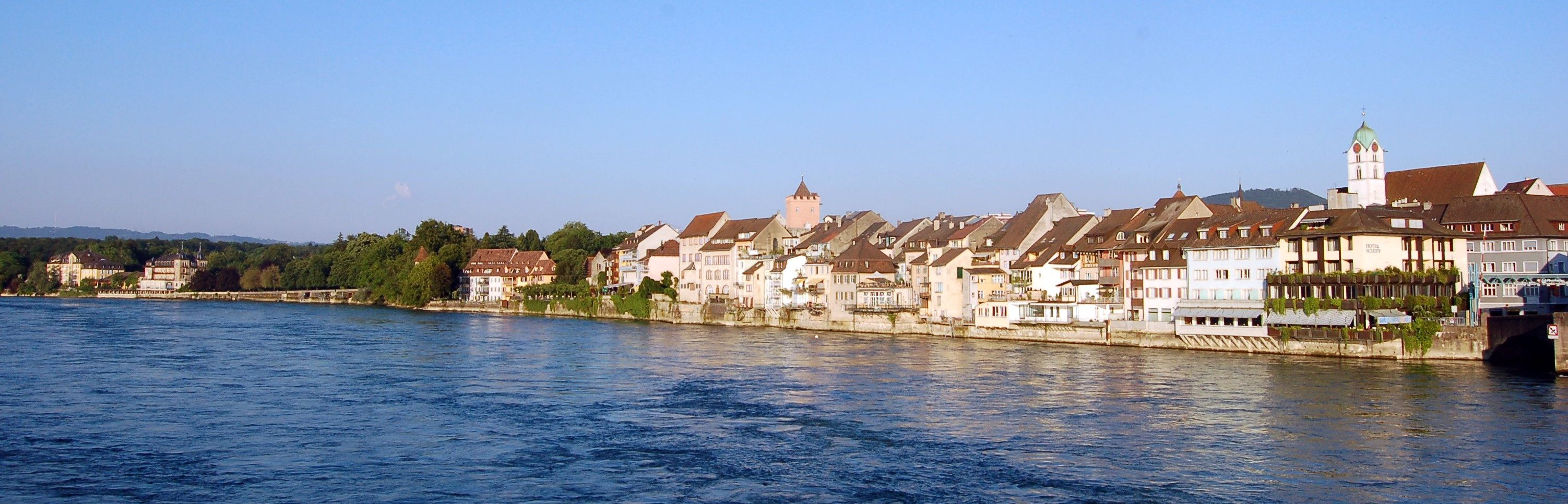

- Flag Coat of arms
- Location of Rheinfelden
- Location within Switzerland Location within Canton of Aargau
- Coordinates: 47°33′N 7°48′E
- Country: Switzerland
- Canton: Aargau
- District: Rheinfelden

Government
  - Executive: Gemeinderat with 5 members
  - Mayor: Stadtammmann (list); Franco Mazzi FDP/PRD (as of February 2014)

Area
  - Total: 16.12 km^{2} (6.22 sq mi)
- Elevation: 280 m (920 ft)

Population (December 2007)
  - Total: 10,881
  - Density: 675.0/km^{2} (1,748/sq mi)
- Time zone: UTC+01:00 (CET)
  - Summer (DST): UTC+02:00 (CEST)
- Postal code: 4310
- SFOS number: 4258
- ISO 3166 code: CH-AG
- Surrounded by: Kaiseraugst, Magden, Möhlin, Olsberg, Rheinfelden (DE-BW), Schwörstadt (DE-BW)
- Website: http://www.rheinfelden.ch

Rheinfelden (Swiss Standard German pronunciation: [ˈraɪnˌfɛldn̩]; Alemannic German: Rhyfälde [ˈriːfæld̥ə]) is a municipality in the canton of Aargau in Switzerland, seat of the district of Rheinfelden. It is located 15 kilometres east of Basel. The name means the fields of the Rhine, as the town is located on the High Rhine. It is home to Feldschlösschen, the most popular beer in Switzerland. The city is across the river from Rheinfelden in Baden-Württemberg; the two cities were joined until Napoleon Bonaparte fixed the Germany–Switzerland border on the Rhine in 1802 and are still socially and economically tied.

== Geography ==
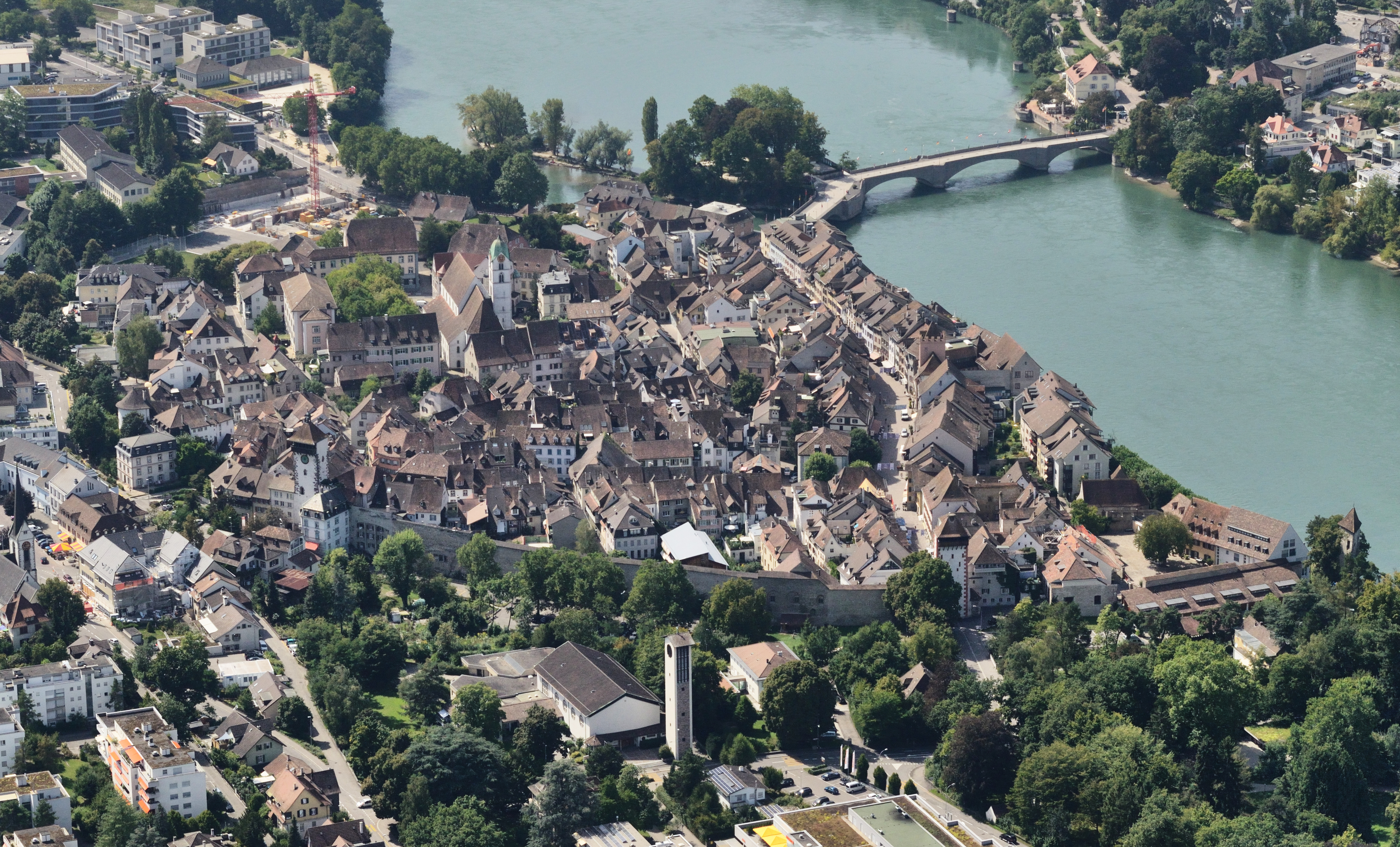
Aerial view at the historic centre

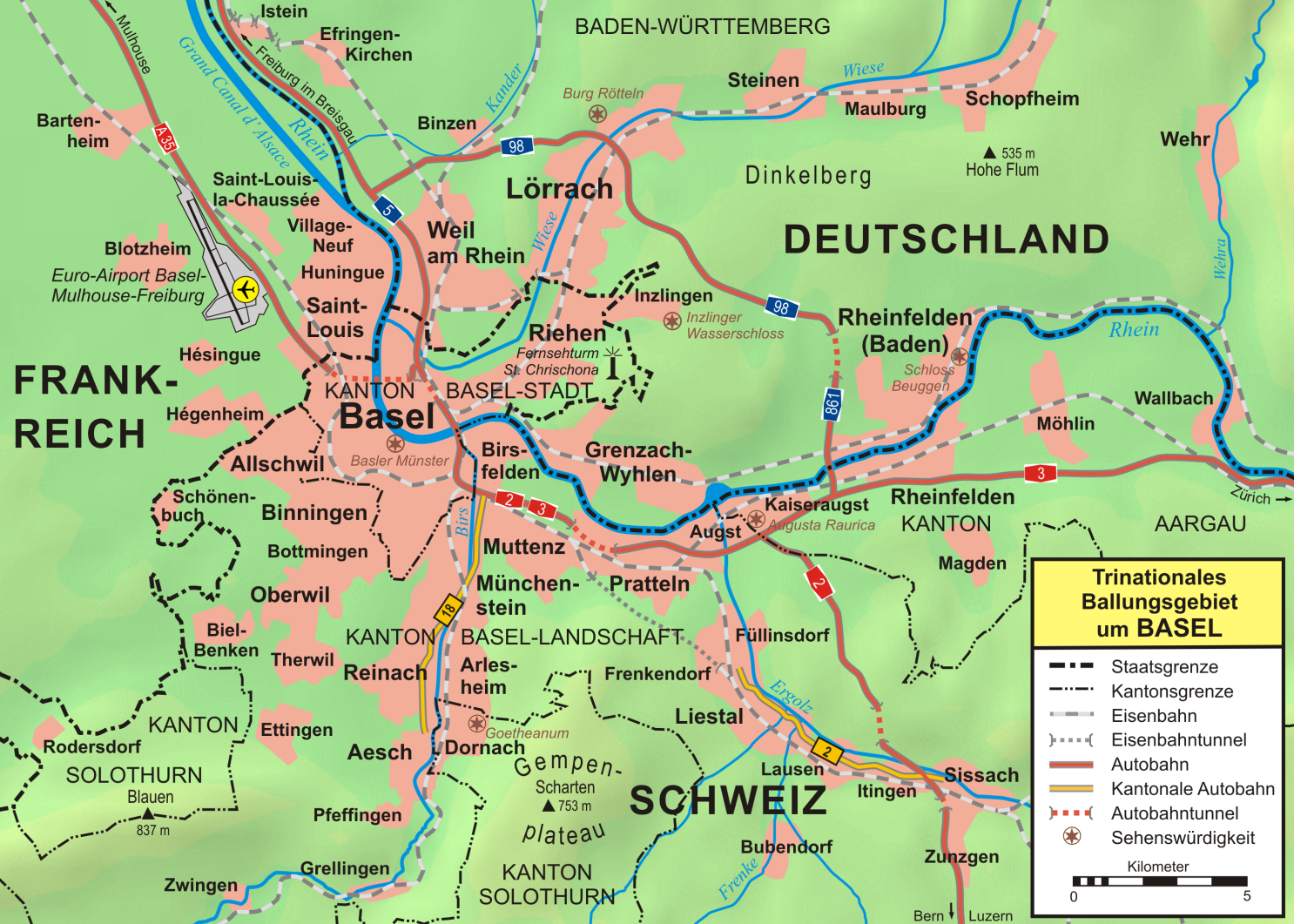
Rheinfelden, shown to the right of Greater Basel

The old town of Rheinfelden lies on the left bank of the Rhine, where the river is divided into two arms by the "Inseli", a roughly 150 metres (490 ft) long island. Downstream of the Inseli and the Rheinbrücke, the river bottoms drops to about 30 m (98 ft) deep, creating a huge and deadly vortex, known as the St-Anna-Loch. Nearly 400 m (1,300 ft) east is the Magdenerbach.

The wooded, gently-rising foothills of the Tafeljura lie south of the town. These are the Steppberg (395 m [1,296 ft]above sea level) and the "Berg" (427 m [1,401 ft]), both in the south-east. Between these two hills lie the deeply incised valleys of the Magdenerbach.

Rheinfelden has an area, (as of the 2004/09 survey) of 16.02 km^{2} (6.19 sq mi). Of this area, about 20.7% is used for agricultural purposes, while 50.0% is forested. Of the rest of the land, 22.6% is settled (buildings or roads) and 6.7% is unproductive land. In the 2013/18 survey a total of 213 ha (530 acres) or about 13.3% of the total area was covered with buildings, an increase of 57 ha (140 acres) over the 1982 amount. Over the same time period, the amount of recreational space in the municipality increased by 25 ha (62 acres) and is now about 3.43% of the total area. Of the agricultural land, 4 ha (9.9 acres) is used for orchards and vineyards, 297 ha (730 acres) is fields and grasslands. Since 1982 the amount of agricultural land has decreased by 104 ha (260 acres). Over the same time period the amount of forested land has increased by 6 ha (15 acres). Rivers and lakes cover 108 ha (270 acres) in the municipality.

The highest point (427 m (1,401 ft)) is located on "Berg", the lowest point (270 m (890 ft)) is on the Rhine. Neighbouring cities are Kaiseraugst to the west, Olsberg to the south-west, Magden to the south and Möhlin to the east (all in the Aargau); over the river in Germany lies Rheinfelden, Baden-Württemberg.

== History ==
Aerial view (1945)

The area around Rheinfelden was already settled in the Middle Stone Age, around 10,000 years before the present day. At that time, people lived in the "Hermitage", a small natural cave next to the current highway. In the year 45 BC, a few kilometres further west, the settlement Augusta Raurica was founded, the first Roman town in Switzerland, near modern Kaiseraugst. In the plains at Rheinfelden was then a large estate. Towards the end of the 4th century a border fort was constructed at the western settlement.

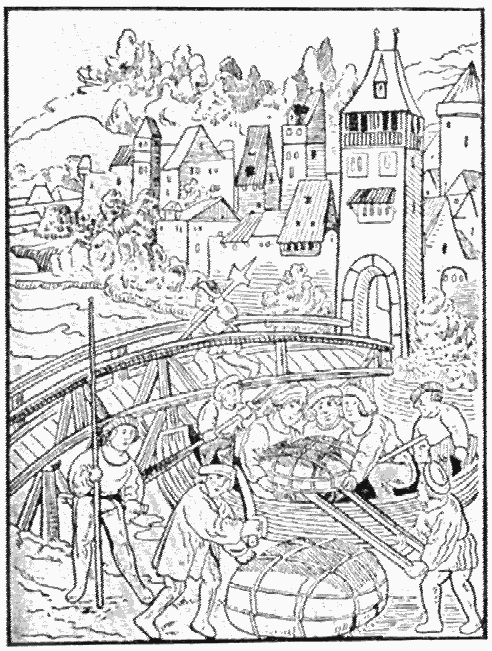
Loading a boat near the gate of Rheinfelden from Diebold Schillings "Schweizerchronik" from 1484. The Rhein has always played a pivotal role in the development of Rheinfelden.

Rheinfelden is first mentioned about 851 as Rifelt and in the first half of the 12th century it was called Rinfelden. In the second half of the 10th century, the entire Fricktal area—the Frick valley, a finger of land in northwestern Switzerland east of present-day Basel, between the Jura Mountains to the south, and the High Rhine border with present-day Germany to the north—was within Kingdom of Burgundy. At that time, Rheinfelden was granted to the von Wetterau family. They later adopted the title of Count of Rheinfelden. The Rheinfeldens built a fortress, "Stein", on the strategically located island; a riverbank settlement stood at the "Altenburg". The last of this comital line was Rudolf of Rheinfelden, Duke of Swabia (1057–79) and German antiking (1077–80) during the Investiture Controversy.

When Rudolf died on 15 October 1080 in Merseburg, his territories were inherited by Berthold II of Zähringen.but the town went to his son Otto and his family the von Wetter's. Berhold's second son, Conrad, awarded market rights to the city, making it the oldest Zähringerstadt in Switzerland and the oldest city in the Aargau; in 1150 he also had the first bridge built across the Rhine, between Konstanz and Strasbourg. In 1218, Berthold V died without issue. In 1225, Rheinfelden gained Reichsfreiheit to become an Imperial City.

A little over a century later, in 1330, the city pledged itself to the Habsburgs, becoming a part of Further Austria. In 1445, when the Habsburgs were fighting the Old Zürich War, insurgents destroyed the castle on the "Inseli", due to the city's allegiance with Basel. After a siege lasting several months, Rheinfelden was returned to Austrian subjugation in 1449. After the Waldshut War from 1468, all of Fricktal Burgundy pledged to the Habsburgs. After the Burgundians were beaten by the Old Swiss Confederacy in the Burgundian Wars, Rheinfelden land, not Title, was restored to Austria in 1477.

During the 17th century, there was very little time during which the city enjoyed peace. During the Rappenkrieg, a peasant uprising that lasted from 1612 until 1614, the city was unsuccessfully besieged but devastated. Between 1633 and 1638 the Thirty Years' War reached Fricktal, where Rheinfelden played an important role. On 15 July 1633, Swedish and French troops devastated the city. On 5 February 1638, the city was besieged by Protestant troops under the command of Bernhard of Saxe-Weimar. On 28 February the Battle of Rheinfelden began, as the city was attacked by numerically superior Imperial and Bavarian troops under the command of Johann von Werth and Federico Savelli. The Protestants lost this encounter and withdrew. Bernhard brought them weapons, but in the second action, on 3 March, they were victorious, as he and his men unexpectedly re-appeared on the battlefield; both Savelli and Werth were captured.

By the end of the Thirty Years' War, the Austrians had built a fortress on the island to secure the southwestern border of the Breisgau. In 1678, French troops under the command of François de Créquy fired at the city. In 1745, during the War of the Austrian Succession, the French made a fortress on the same ground and also blasted a portion of the city wall. On 17 July 1796 Rheinfelden was again occupied and looted by the French.

As a result of the Treaty of Campo Formio in 1797, the Fricktal became a French protectorate, forming the front line between the French Revolutionary and the Austrian troops in the War of the Second Coalition. On 20 February 1802 Rheinfelden was made a district capital of the newly created Canton of Fricktal, (Principality of Frickgau), joining the Helvetic Republic in August, the point at which the city became decisively Swiss. After the removal of the governor Sebastian Fahrländer at the end of September 1802, the seat of the cantonal government was relocated here from Laufenburg. With the beginning of the Reichsdeputationshauptschluss (the German Mediatisation), Napoleon Bonaparte dissolved the canton of Fricktal. Since 19 March 1803, Rheinfelden has been the capital of a district of the same name, in the canton of Aargau. With the Reichsdeputationshauptschluss, the remaining (German) parts of the city lost their independence to the Grand Duchy of Baden, becoming Rheinfelden, Germany.

== Mayors ==
- 1945: Eugen Walz
- 1945–1946: Franz Fischer
- 1946–1948: Alois Maier
- 1948–1988: Herbert King
- 1988–2012: Eberhard Niethammer
- since 2012: Klaus Eberhardt (born 1956)

== Coat of arms ==
The blazon of the municipal coat of arms is Barry of Six Or and Gules with three Mullets of the first.

== Demographics ==
Rheinfelden has a population (as of December 2020) of 13,551. As of June 2009, 27.6% of the population are foreign nationals. Over the last 10 years (1997–2007) the population has changed at a rate of 6.1%. Most of the population (as of 2000) speaks German (82.9%), with Italian being second most common (3.8%) and Serbo-Croatian being third (2.0%).

The age distribution, as of 2008, in Rheinfelden is; 1,031 children or 9.1% of the population are between 0 and 9 years old and 1,173 teenagers or 10.4% are between 10 and 19. Of the adult population, 1,418 people or 12.6% of the population are between 20 and 29 years old. 1,652 people or 14.6% are between 30 and 39, 1,904 people or 16.9% are between 40 and 49, and 1,544 people or 13.7% are between 50 and 59. The senior population distribution is 1,260 people or 11.2% of the population are between 60 and 69 years old, 790 people or 7.0% are between 70 and 79, there are 441 people or 3.9% who are between 80 and 89, and there are 77 people or 0.7% who are 90 and older.

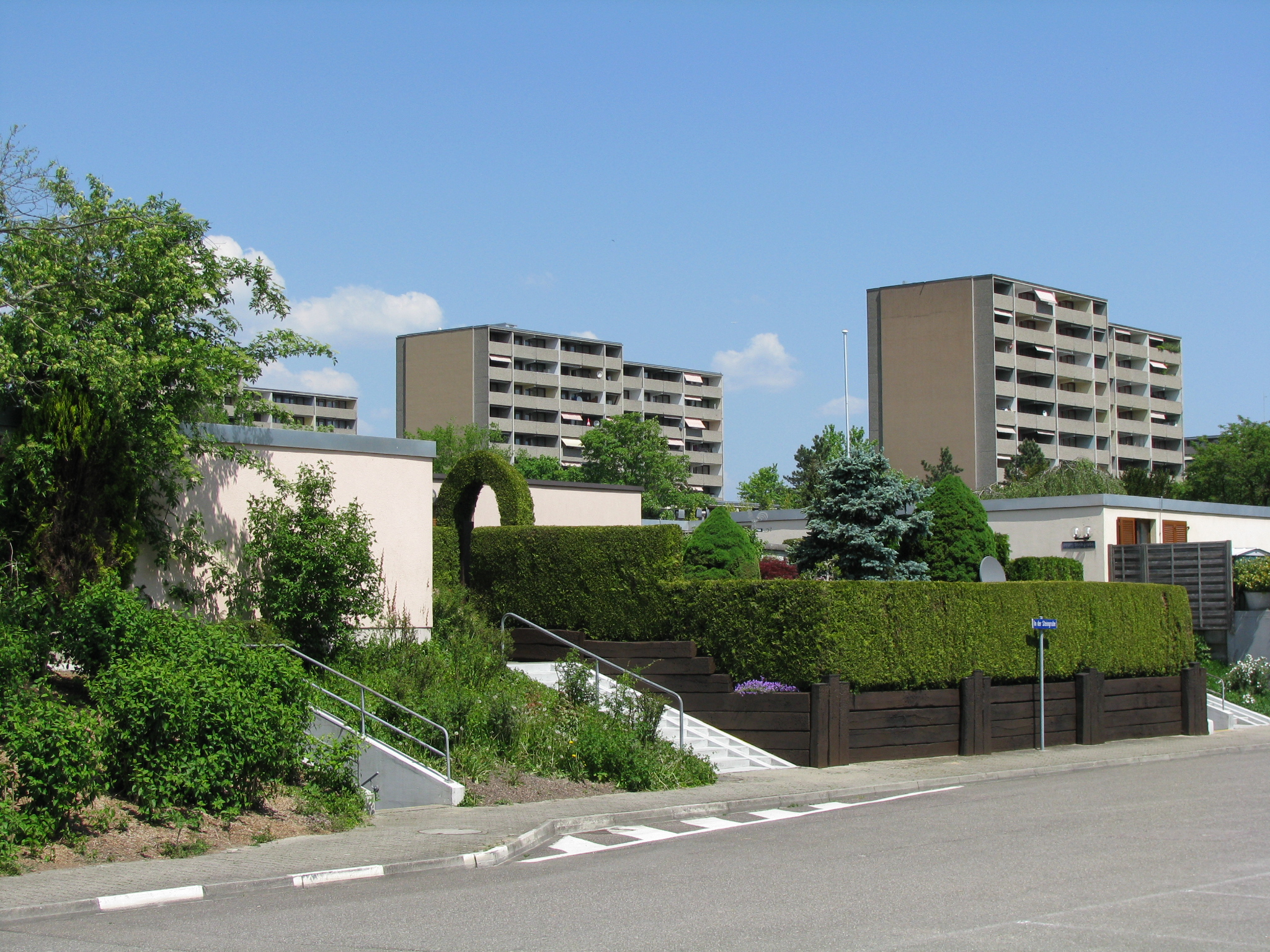
Apartment towers in Augarten, part of Rheinfelden

As of 2000, there were 682 homes with 1 or 2 persons in the household, 2,876 homes with 3 or 4 persons in the household, and 1,250 homes with 5 or more persons in the household. As of 2000, there were 4,953 private households (homes and apartments) in the municipality, and an average of 2.1 persons per household. In 2008 there were 958 single family homes (or 15.7% of the total) out of a total of 6,087 homes and apartments. There were a total of 86 empty apartments for a 1.4% vacancy rate. As of 2007, the construction rate of new housing units was 2.8 new units per 1000 residents.

In the 2007 federal election the most popular party was the SP which received 27.64% of the vote. The next three most popular parties were the SVP (26.15%), the FDP (16.05%) and the CVP (11.13%). In the federal election, a total of 2,934 votes were cast, and the voter turnout was 42.9%.

The historical population is given in the following table:

Historical population
| Year | Pop. | ±% |
|---|---|---|
| 1788 | 1,226 | — |
| 1850 | 1,910 | +55.8% |
| 1900 | 3,349 | +75.3% |
| 1950 | 4,550 | +35.9% |
| 1970 | 6,866 | +50.9% |
| 2000 | 10,637 | +54.9% |

== Heritage sites of national significance ==
The entire old town of Rheinfelden is designated as part of the Inventory of Swiss Heritage Sites. There are seven sites in Rheinfelden that are listed as Swiss heritage sites of national significance. Two religious buildings are on the list, the Christian Catholic collegiate church of St. Martin and the Johanniter Chapel at Johannitergasse 70. Three fortifications are on the list; the Heimenholz and the Pferrichgraben which were both part of the old Roman era Rhine fortications and the entire medieval city wall. The last two buildings on the list are the Feldschlösschen brewery at Feldschlösschenstrasse 34 and the former Gasthof (combination hotel and restaurant) zum goldenen Adler at Obertorplatz 4.

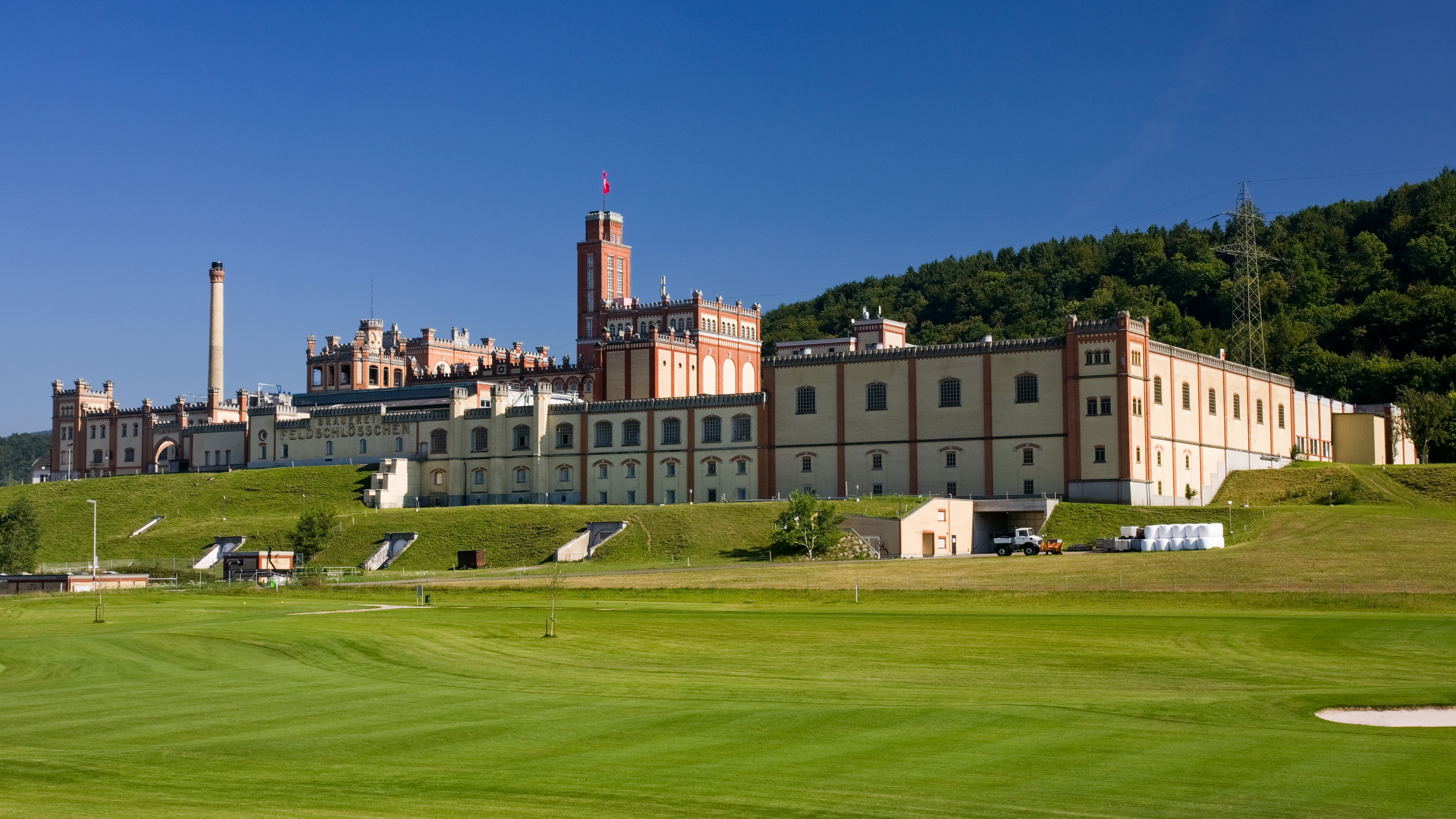
Feldschlösschen brewery

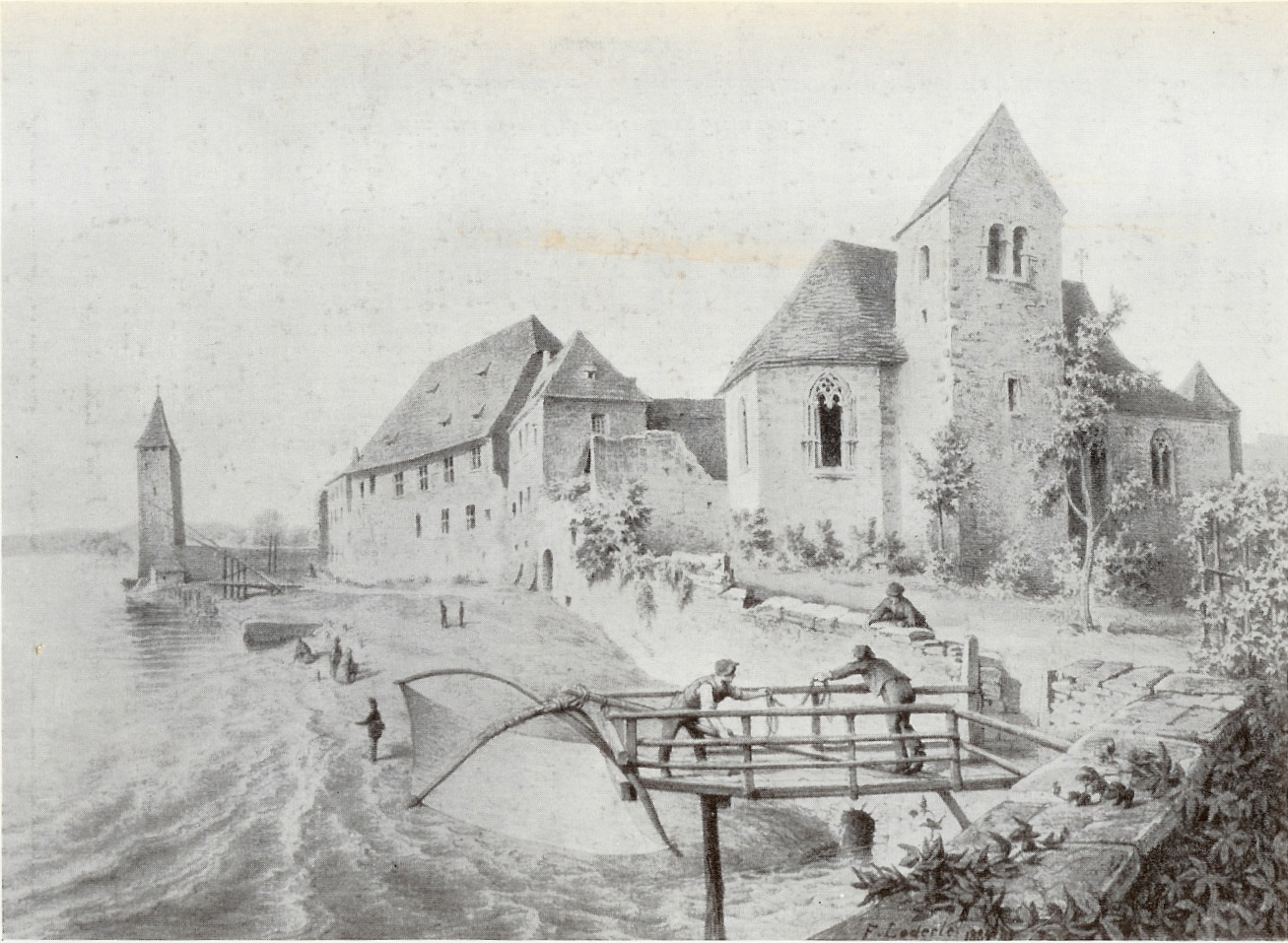
Johanniter Order house with chapel to the right

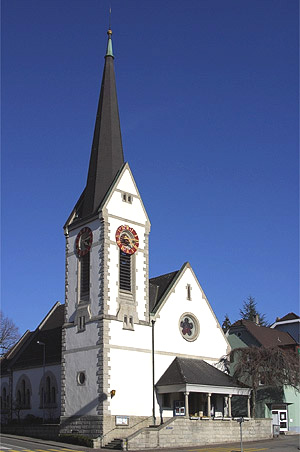
Protestant Church of Rheinfelden

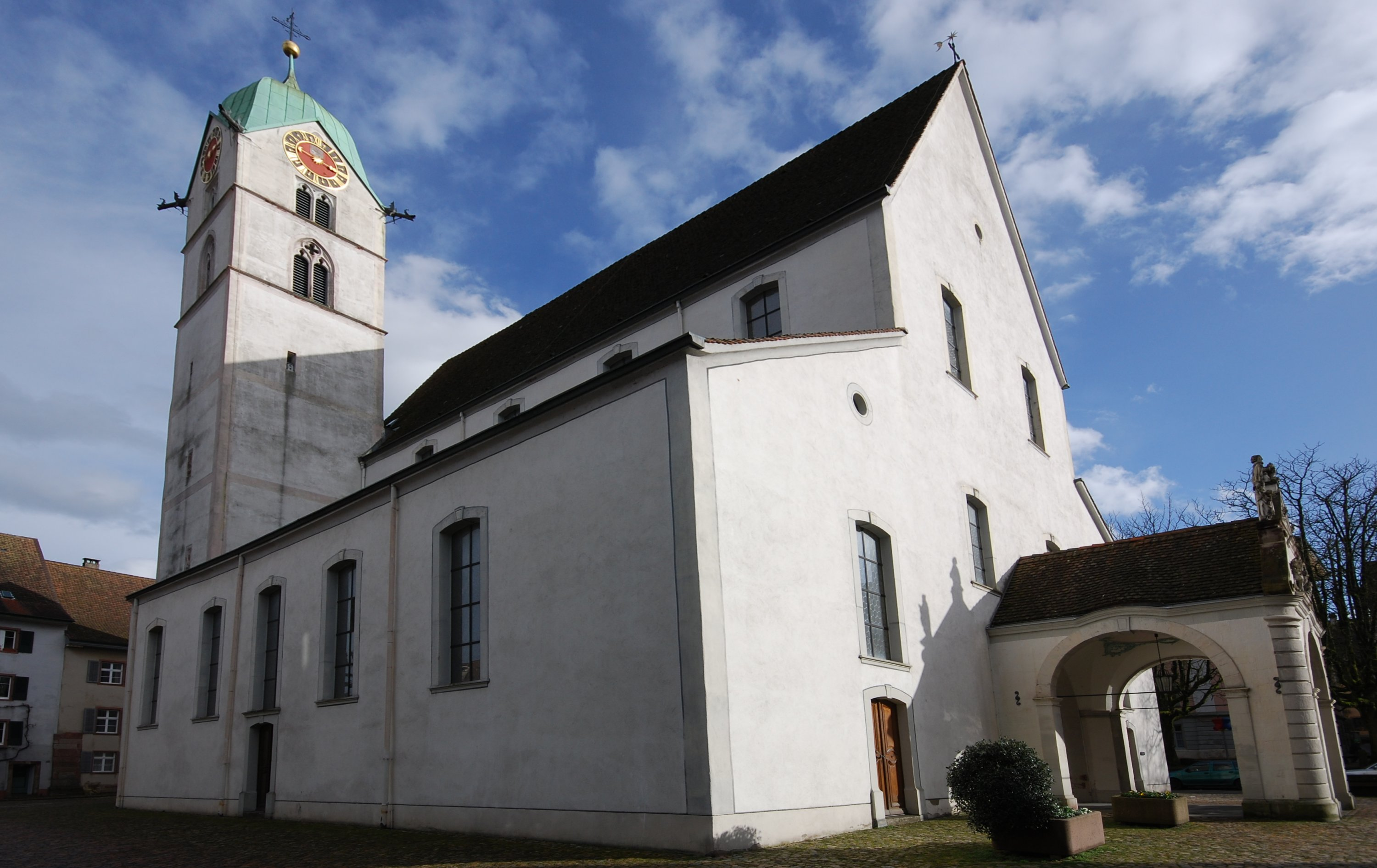
St. Martin's Church

== Economy ==
As of 2007, Rheinfelden had an unemployment rate of 3.83%. As of 2005, there were 40 people employed in the primary economic sector and about 9 businesses involved in this sector. 1,313 people are employed in the secondary sector and there are 86 businesses in this sector. 4,420 people are employed in the tertiary sector, with 432 businesses in this sector.

In 2000 there were 5,437 workers who lived in the municipality. Of these, 3,453 or about 63.5% of the residents worked outside Rheinfelden while 2,807 people commuted into the municipality for work. There were a total of 4,791 jobs (of at least 6 hours per week) in the municipality. Of the working population, 26.3% used public transportation to get to work, and 39.2% used a private car.

== Religion ==
From the 2000 census, 3,858 or 36.1% were Roman Catholic, while 3,520 or 33.0% belonged to the Swiss Reformed Church. Of the rest of the population, there were 285 individuals (or about 2.67% of the population) who belonged to the Christian Catholic faith.

== Transport ==
Rheinfelden sits on the Bözberg railway line and served by local and regional trains at Rheinfelden and Rheinfelden Augarten.

== Education ==
In Rheinfelden about 73.6% of the population (between age 25–64) have completed either non-mandatory upper secondary education or additional higher education (either university or a Fachhochschule). Of the school age population (in the 2008/2009 school year), there are 667 students attending primary school, there are 251 students attending secondary school, there are 386 students attending tertiary or university level schooling, and there are 18 students who are seeking a job after school in the municipality.

Rheinfelden is home to the Stadtbibliothek Rheinfelden library. The library has (as of 2008) 16,442 books or other media, and loaned out 58,291 items in the same year. It was open a total of 250 days with average of 30 hours per week during that year.

== Notable people ==
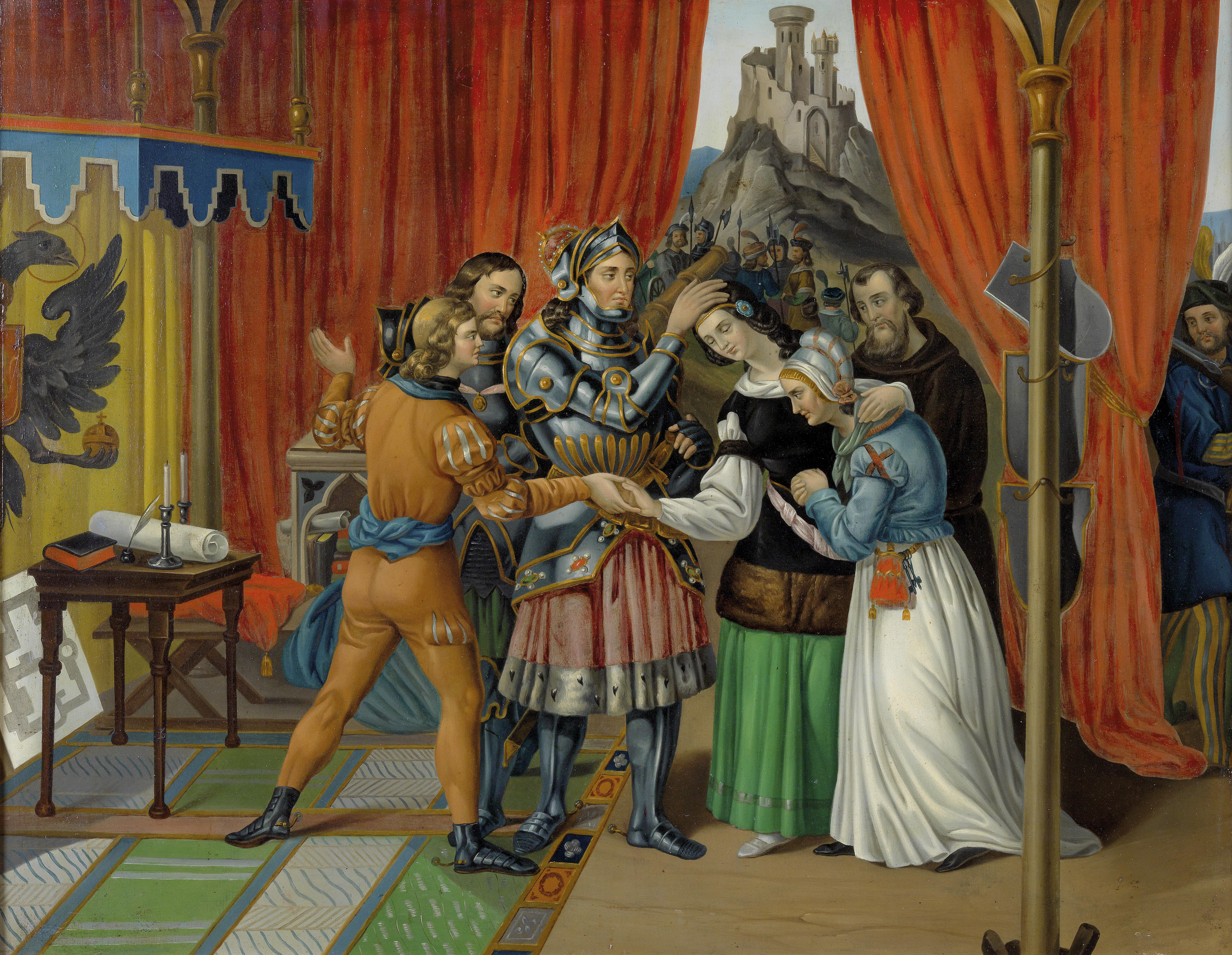
König Rudolf & Agnes von Böhmen

- Matilda of Habsburg (1253 in Rheinfelden – 1304), by marriage, a duchess of Bavaria.
- Hedwig of Habsburg (ca.1260 Rheinfelden, Swabia – 1303) Margravine of Brandenburg 1279-1285/1286
- Rudolf II, Duke of Austria (ca. 1270 in Rheinfelden, Duchy of Swabia – 1290) Duke of Austria and Styria, 1282-1283
- Jacob Sprenger (1436/1438 in Rheinfelden, Further Austria – 1495) a Dominican Friar
- Ernst Hermann Joseph Münch (1798–1841), a Roman Catholic historian of Germany.
- Jakob Christof Rad (1799 in Rheinfelden - 1871) a Swiss-born physician and industrial manager
- Andreas Kyburz (born 1988 in Rheinfelden) a Swiss orienteering competitor

=== Sport ===
- Ivan Rakitić (born 1988 in Rheinfelden) a Croatian professional footballer who plays for Spanish club Sevilla
- Yannick Käser (born 1992 in Rheinfelden) a Swiss breaststroke swimmer
- Alexander Ursenbacher (born 1996 in Rheinfelden) a Swiss professional snooker player
- Eray Cömert (born 1998 in Rheinfelden), a footballer who has played 170 games and 15 for Switzerland

== Weather ==
Climate data for Rheinfelden (1961–1990)
| Month | Jan | Feb | Mar | Apr | May | Jun | Jul | Aug | Sep | Oct | Nov | Dec | Year |
|---|---|---|---|---|---|---|---|---|---|---|---|---|---|
| Mean daily maximum °C (°F) | 2.9 (37.2) | 5.5 (41.9) | 9.9 (49.8) | 14.5 (58.1) | 18.9 (66.0) | 22.0 (71.6) | 24.7 (76.5) | 23.9 (75.0) | 20.6 (69.1) | 14.6 (58.3) | 7.7 (45.9) | 3.8 (38.8) | 14.1 (57.4) |
| Daily mean °C (°F) | −0.1 (31.8) | 1.5 (34.7) | 4.6 (40.3) | 8.3 (46.9) | 12.5 (54.5) | 15.8 (60.4) | 18.1 (64.6) | 17.3 (63.1) | 14.1 (57.4) | 9.7 (49.5) | 4.2 (39.6) | 0.9 (33.6) | 8.9 (48.0) |
| Mean daily minimum °C (°F) | −3.0 (26.6) | −1.9 (28.6) | 0.2 (32.4) | 3.0 (37.4) | 7.1 (44.8) | 10.4 (50.7) | 12.3 (54.1) | 11.9 (53.4) | 9.3 (48.7) | 5.9 (42.6) | 1.0 (33.8) | −1.9 (28.6) | 4.5 (40.1) |
| Average precipitation mm (inches) | 74 (2.9) | 68 (2.7) | 69 (2.7) | 78 (3.1) | 97 (3.8) | 100 (3.9) | 86 (3.4) | 102 (4.0) | 75 (3.0) | 66 (2.6) | 79 (3.1) | 80 (3.1) | 974 (38.3) |
| Average snowfall cm (inches) | 13 (5.1) | 13 (5.1) | 3 (1.2) | 0 (0) | 0 (0) | 0 (0) | 0 (0) | 0 (0) | 0 (0) | 0 (0) | 4 (1.6) | 8 (3.1) | 41 (16) |
| Average precipitation days (≥ 1.0 mm) | 12.2 | 10.9 | 12.4 | 12.7 | 13.4 | 11.9 | 10.4 | 11.5 | 9.2 | 8.9 | 11.4 | 11.7 | 136.6 |
| Average snowy days (≥ 1.0 cm) | 3.4 | 2.9 | 0.9 | 0.1 | 0.0 | 0.0 | 0.0 | 0.0 | 0.0 | 0.0 | 1.2 | 2.4 | 10.9 |
| Average relative humidity (%) | 83 | 79 | 75 | 71 | 72 | 72 | 71 | 74 | 79 | 83 | 84 | 83 | 77 |
Source: MeteoSwiss
