= Ernst Hermann Joseph Münch =

German historian (1798–1841)

- Ernst Münch
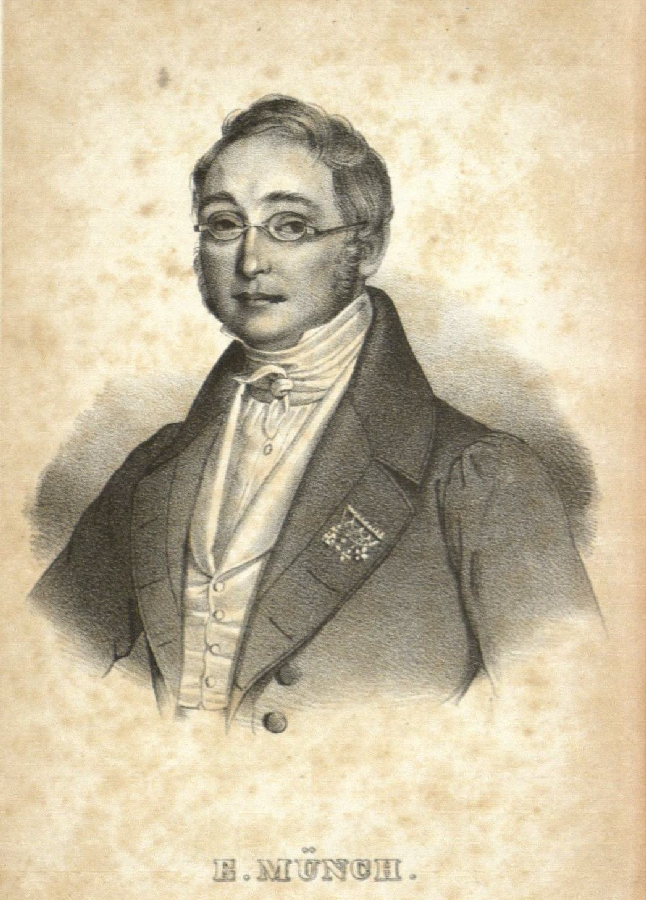
- Эрнст Герман Йозеф фон Мюнх
- Born: Ernst Hermann Joseph von Münch; 25 October 1798; Rheinfelden
- Died: 9 June 1841 (aged 42)
- Occupation: Librarian, historian, university teacher
- Employer: University of Freiburg; University of Liège

Ernst Hermann Joseph Münch (25 October 1798 – 9 June 1841) was a distinguished Roman Catholic historian of Germany.

He was born in Rheinfelden on 25 October 1798. He studied at Freiburg, was in 1819 teacher at Aarau, in 1824 professor at Freiburg, in 1828 professor of Church history and canon law at Liege. In 1831 he accepted a call to Stuttgart as librarian to the king, and died on 9 June 1841.

He published, Die Heerzuge des christlichen Europa wider die Osmanen (Basle, 1822–26, 5 volumes): — Franz von Sickingen's Thaten (Stuttgart, 1827–29, 3 volumes): — Sammlung aller alteren und neueren Konkordate (1830–31, 2 volumes): — Geschichte des Monchthums (1828, 2 volumes): — Allgemeine Geschichte der katholischen Kirche (1838): — Romische Zustande und katholische Kirchenfragen (eod.): — Denkwurdigkeiten zur politischen Reformations und Sittengeschichte, etc. (1839): — Allgemeine Geschichte der neuesten Zeit (1833–35, 6 volumes). See Winer, Handbuch der theol. Lit. 1:696, 701, 747; Zuchold, Bibl. Theol. 2:920; especially the author's Erinnerungen und Studien aus den ersten 37 Jahren eines deutschen Gelehrten (Carlsruhe, 1836–38, 3 volumes). (B.P.)

This article incorporates public domain material from McClintock, John; Strong, James (1867–1887). Cyclopædia of Biblical, Theological and Ecclesiastical Literature. Harper and Brothers.
