= Kaiseraugst =

Place in Aargau, Switzerland

- Municipality
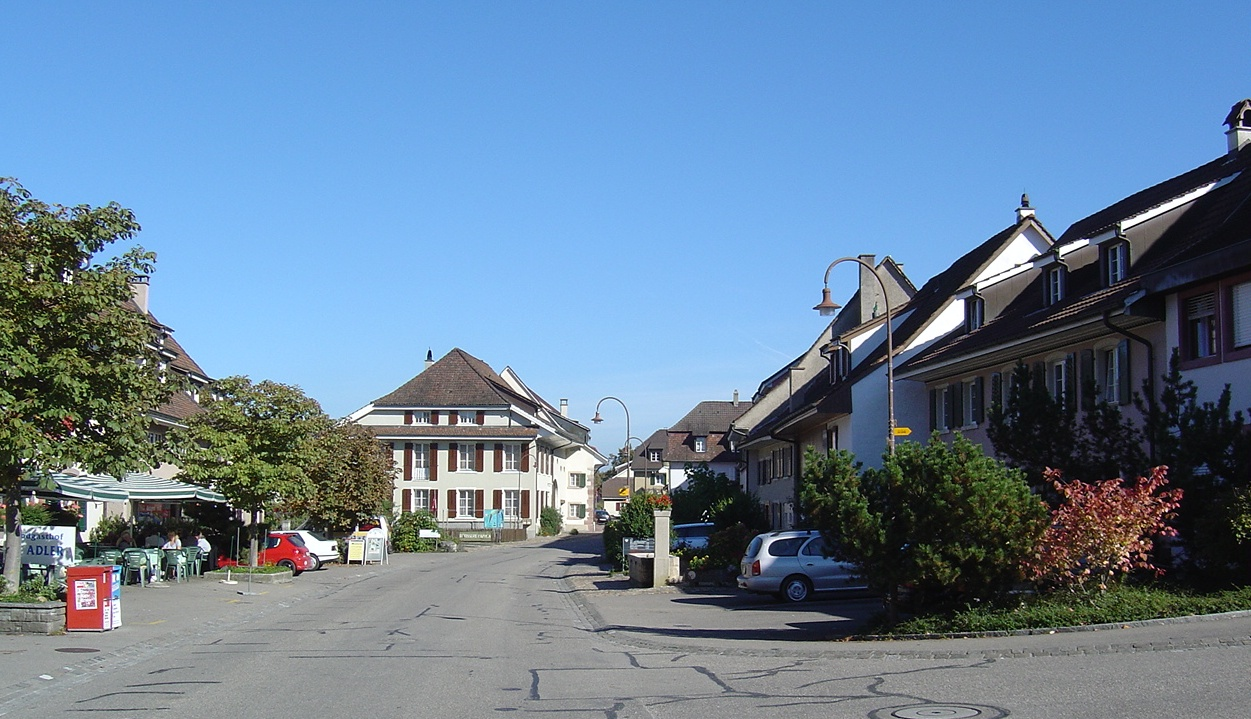
- Kaiseraugst village center

- Flag Coat of arms
- Location of Kaiseraugst
- Location within Switzerland Location within Canton of Aargau
- Coordinates: 47°32′17″N 7°43′46″E
- Country: Switzerland
- Canton: Aargau
- District: Rheinfelden

Area
  - Total: 4.91 km^{2} (1.90 sq mi)
- Elevation: 269 m (883 ft)

Population (December 2005)
  - Total: 4,849
  - Density: 988/km^{2} (2,560/sq mi)
- Time zone: UTC+01:00 (CET)
  - Summer (DST): UTC+02:00 (CEST)
- Postal code: 4303
- SFOS number: 4252
- ISO 3166 code: CH-AG
- Surrounded by: Augst (BL), Giebenach (BL), Grenzach-Wyhlen (DE-BW), Olsberg, Rheinfelden (DE-BW), Rheinfelden
- Website: www.kaiseraugst.ch

Kaiseraugst (Swiss German: Chhäiseraugscht) is a municipality in the district of Rheinfelden in the canton of Aargau in Switzerland. It is named after the Ancient Roman city of Augusta Raurica whose ruins are nearby. The prefix Kaiser- ("imperial") refers to the fact that from medieval times the town formed part of the Habsburg territory of Further Austria, as opposed to the neighbouring village of Augst, which was part of the Canton of Basel in the Old Swiss Confederacy.

== History ==
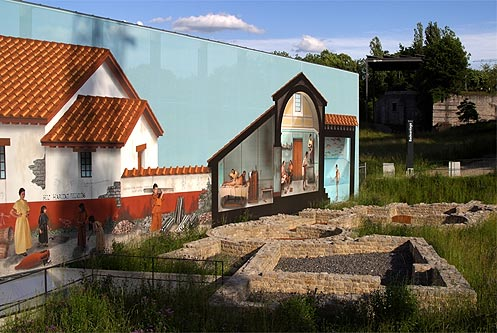
Reconstruction of a bath at Augusta Raurica

About AD 300, following the loss of the Limes Germanicus and the right bank of the Rhine, the Roman army built a fort near the city of Augusta Raurica. The fort, which was named Castrum Rauracense, was intended to serve as the headquarters of the legio I Martia and to protect a ford over the Rhine. During the 4th century, the fort grew in importance because it commanded a bridge that lay along the road from Gaul to the Danube, and sometime around 337 and 341 AD, an amphitheatre, likely the youngest known Roman amphitheatre, was constructed. Emperors Constantius II and Julian assembled their armies at the Castrum Rauracense before marching to battle against the Alemanni.

Following the collapse of the Roman Empire the fort remained occupied as local Germanic tribes moved in. The fort and neighboring church became the seat of a bishop during the 4th century, with the bishop first being mentioned in 346. In the 7th century the bishop moved to Basel and the settlement declined in importance. In 752 a village called Augusta was first mentioned, however it was not until 1442 that the village of Augst split into Augst and Kaiseraugst.

In 894 the East Francian King Arnulf granted the church in Kaiseraugst to his vassal Anno. The church was then granted to the Abbey of St Gall and then later to the Basel Münster. The original church, built in AD 400, was replaced with a new building in 1749. Following the Act of Mediation in 1803 the church was granted to the new canton of Aargau. In 1878 the majority of the community became Christian Catholic and took over the church. In 1900/01 the Roman Catholic church was built and the original church's property was divided. In the early 1960s, the Kaiseraugst nuclear power plant construction project was met with strong opposition from the population, who occupied the site in 1975. After the Chernobyl disaster, the Swiss government and Kaiseraugst Nuclear Energy AG agreed to abandon the project.

== Geography ==
Aerial view (1963)

Kaiseraugst has an area, as of 2009, of 4.91 square kilometers (1.90 sq mi). Of this area, 0.99 km^{2} (0.38 sq mi) or 20.2% is used for agricultural purposes, while 1.58 km^{2} (0.61 sq mi) or 32.2% is forested. Of the rest of the land, 2.01 km^{2} (0.78 sq mi) or 40.9% is settled (buildings or roads), 0.32 km^{2} (0.12 sq mi) or 6.5% is either rivers or lakes and 0.02 km^{2} (4.9 acres) or 0.4% is unproductive land.

Of the built up area, industrial buildings made up 7.5% of the total area while housing and buildings made up 11.8% and transportation infrastructure made up 14.7%. Power and water infrastructure as well as other special developed areas made up 4.3% of the area while parks, green belts and sports fields made up 2.6%. Out of the forested land, 30.8% of the total land area is heavily forested and 1.4% is covered with orchards or small clusters of trees. Of the agricultural land, 13.6% is used for growing crops and 4.1% is pastures, while 2.4% is used for orchards or vine crops. All the water in the municipality is in rivers and streams.

The municipality is located in the Rheinfelden district, along the Rhine river.

== Coat of arms ==
The blazon of the municipal coat of arms is Gules a Watch Tower Argent.

== Demographics ==
Kaiseraugst has a population (as of December 2020) of 5,550 As of June 2009, 24.7% of the population are foreign nationals. Over the last 10 years (1997–2007) the population has changed at a rate of 33.8%. Most of the population (as of 2000) speaks German(88.2%), with Italian being second most common ( 2.2%) and French being third ( 1.8%).

The age distribution, as of 2008, in Kaiseraugst is; 584 children or 11.3% of the population are between 0 and 9 years old and 538 teenagers or 10.4% are between 10 and 19. Of the adult population, 613 people or 11.8% of the population are between 20 and 29 years old. 793 people or 15.3% are between 30 and 39, 908 people or 17.5% are between 40 and 49, and 695 people or 13.4% are between 50 and 59. The senior population distribution is 558 people or 10.8% of the population are between 60 and 69 years old, 311 people or 6.0% are between 70 and 79, there are 163 people or 3.1% who are between 80 and 89, and there are 18 people or 0.3% who are 90 and older.

As of 2000 the average number of residents per living room was 0.59 which is about equal to the cantonal average of 0.57 per room. In this case, a room is defined as space of a housing unit of at least 4 m^{2} (43 sq ft) as normal bedrooms, dining rooms, living rooms, kitchens and habitable cellars and attics. About 28.1% of the total households were owner occupied, or in other words did not pay rent (though they may have a mortgage or a rent-to-own agreement).

As of 2000, there were 217 homes with 1 or 2 persons in the household, 1,119 homes with 3 or 4 persons in the household, and 352 homes with 5 or more persons in the household. As of 2000, there were 1,708 private households (homes and apartments) in the municipality, and an average of 2.2 persons per household. In 2008 there were 488 single family homes (or 21.8% of the total) out of a total of 2,237 homes and apartments. There were a total of 13 empty apartments for a 0.6% vacancy rate.As of 2007, the construction rate of new housing units was 2.3 new units per 1000 residents.

In the 2007 federal election the most popular party was the SVP which received 32% of the vote. The next three most popular parties were the SP (25.1%), the CVP (14.1%) and the FDP (12.9%).

The historical population is given in the following table:

Historical population
Year	Pop.	±%
1758	215	—
1850	405	+88.4%
1900	595	+46.9%
1950	842	+41.5%
1970	1,311	+55.7%
2000	3,917	+198.8%
2018	5,555	+41.8%

== Heritage sites of national significance ==
The Roman city of Augusta Raurica with the Castrum Rauracense fort is listed as a Swiss heritage site of national significance. The entire village of Kaiseraugst is designated as part of the Inventory of Swiss Heritage Sites. In December 2021, a Roman amphitheater was discovered during construction works in Kaiseraugst. Likely built in the 4th century CE, it is the newest known Roman amphitheater.

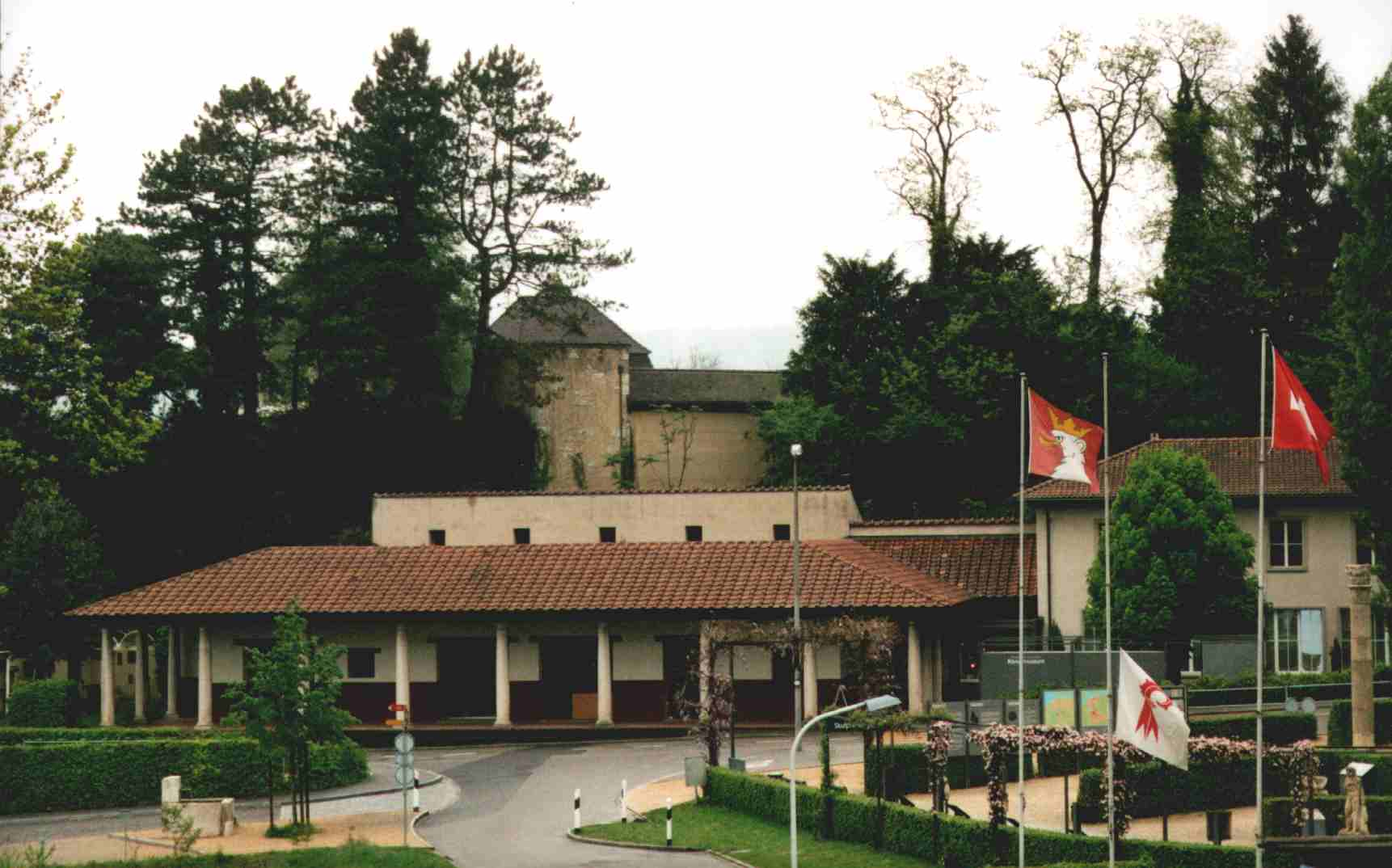
Augusta Raurica Museum

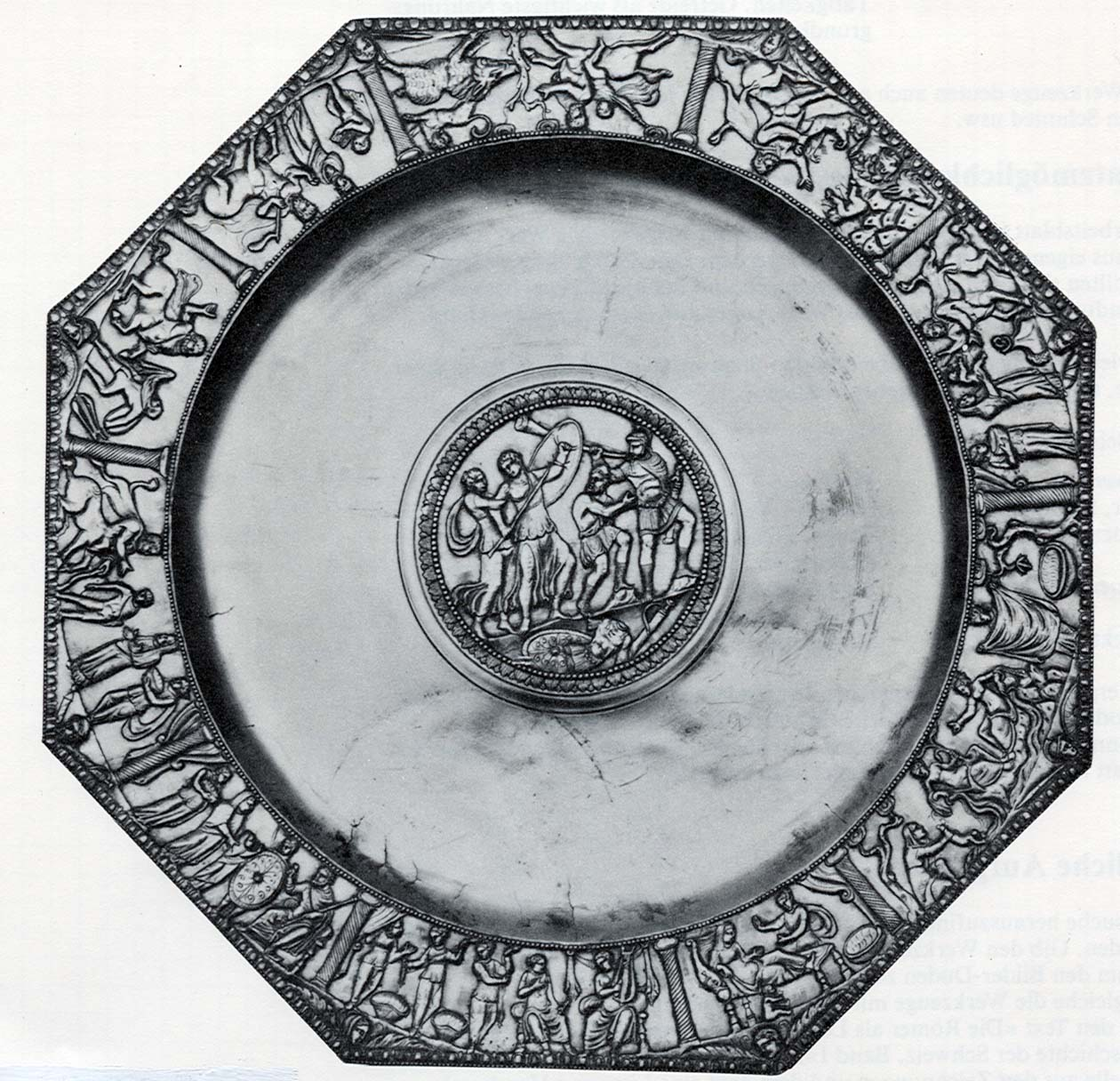
Silver Achilles plate from Augusta Raurica

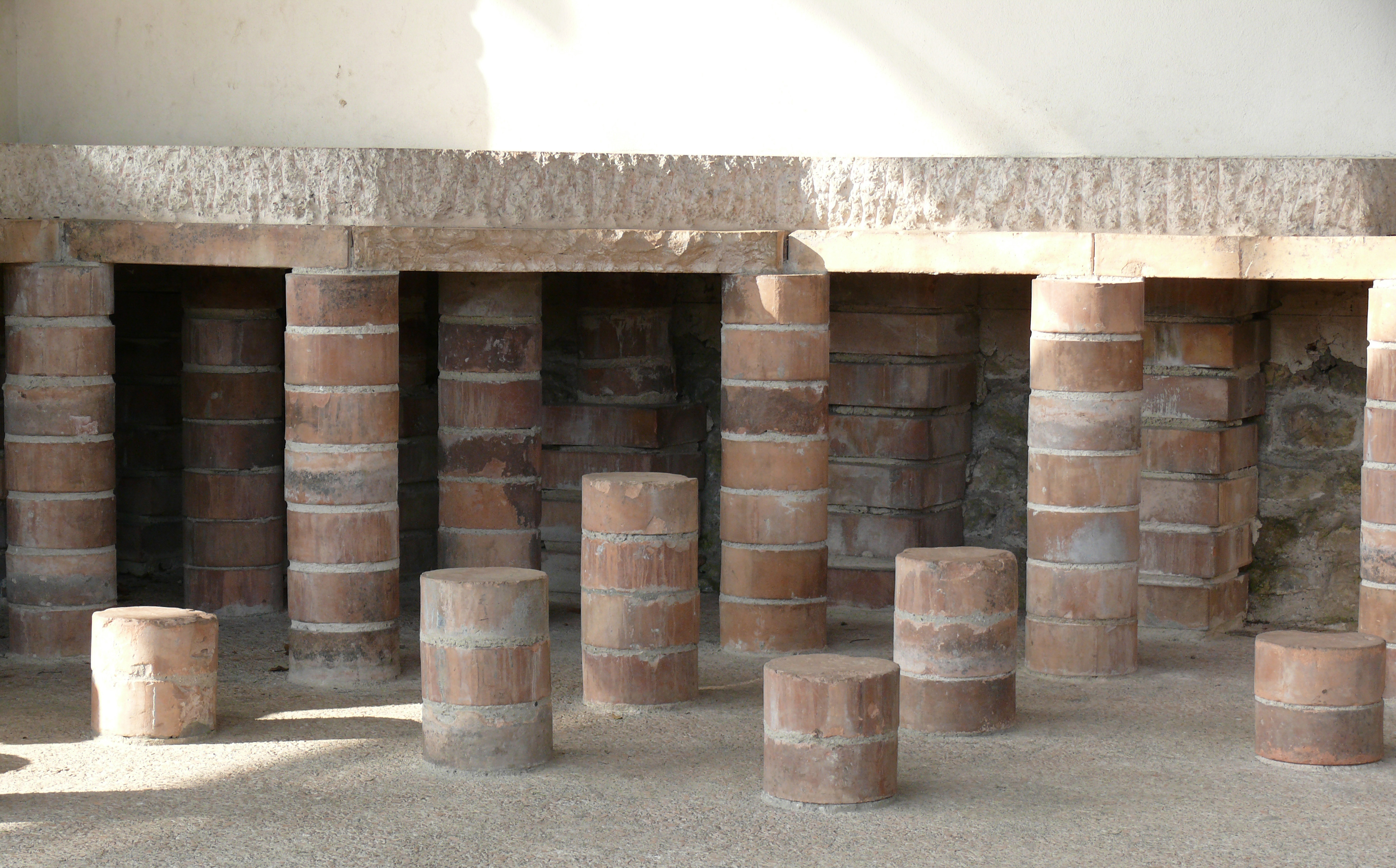
Hypocaust at Augusta Raurica

== Economy ==
As of 2007, Kaiseraugst had an unemployment rate of 3.18%. As of 2005, there were 12 people employed in the primary economic sector and about 4 businesses involved in this sector. 2,629 people are employed in the secondary sector and there are 36 businesses in this sector. 814 people are employed in the tertiary sector, with 125 businesses in this sector.

In 2000 there were 2,048 workers who lived in the municipality. Of these, 1,619 or about 79.1% of the residents worked outside Kaiseraugst while 1,530 people commuted into the municipality for work. There were a total of 1,959 jobs (of at least 6 hours per week) in the municipality. Of the working population, 24.3% used public transportation to get to work, and 46.8% used a private car.

== Religion ==
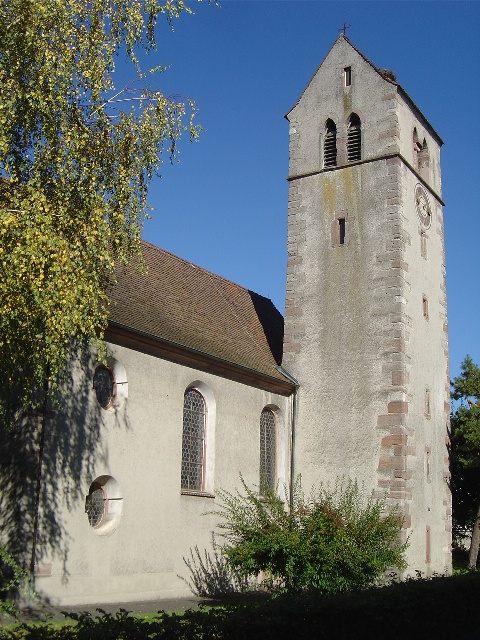
Gallus Church, Christian Catholic Church in Kaiseraugst

From the 2000 census, 1,210 or 30.9% were Roman Catholic, while 1,401 or 35.8% belonged to the Swiss Reformed Church. Of the rest of the population, there were 78 individuals (or about 1.99% of the population) who belonged to the Christian Catholic faith.

== Transport ==
Kaiseraugst sits on the Bözberg railway line and is served by the Basel S-Bahn at Kaiseraugst.

== Education ==
The entire Swiss population is generally well educated. In Kaiseraugst about 76.4% of the population (between age 25–64) have completed either non-mandatory upper secondary education or additional higher education (either university or a Fachhochschule). Of the school age population (in the 2008/2009 school year), there are 395 students attending primary school, there are 123 students attending secondary school, and there are 14 students who are seeking a job after school in the municipality.

Kaiseraugst is home to the Gemeindebibliothek Violahof (municipal library of Kaiseraugst). The library has (as of 2008) 7,167 books or other media, and loaned out 15,774 items in the same year. It was open a total of 143 days with average of 7 hours per week during that year.
