= Amphitheatre of Castrum Rauracense =

Roman amphitheatre

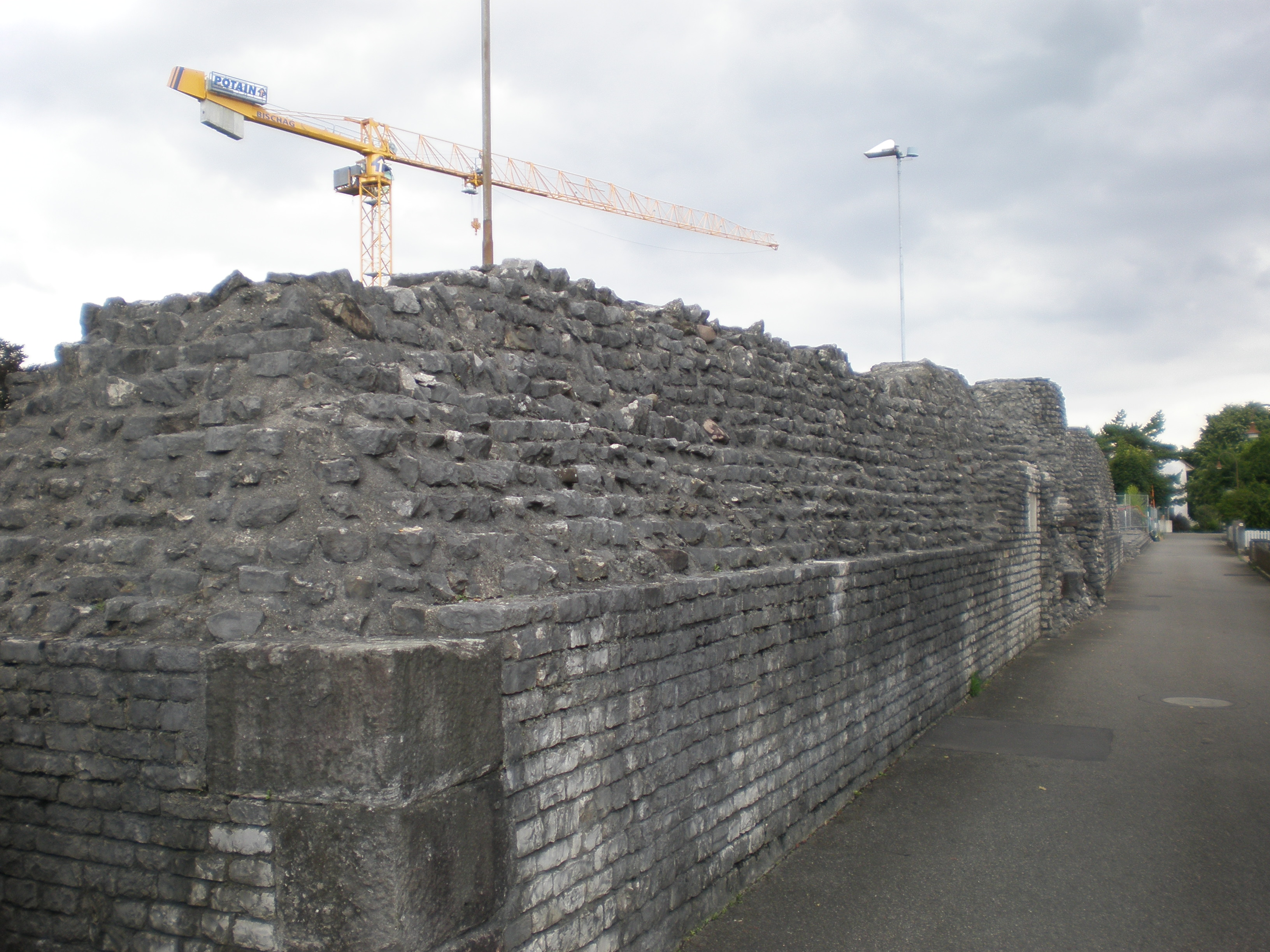
Castrum Rauracense

The Amphitheatre of Castrum Rauracense is the youngest known surviving Roman amphitheatre across the entire Roman Empire. It is located in the ancient Roman fort of Castrum Rauracense, near Kaiseraugst, Switzerland and only ruins survive today. It is the eighth Roman amphitheatre discovered in Switzerland to date.

The fort was built around 300 AD, and the amphitheatre also dates to the fourth century, shortly before the collapse of the Roman Empire and the migration of local Germanic tribes into the area. Based on coins found at the site, the amphitheatre was in use around 337 to 341 AD. It was constructed on the site of a disused Roman quarry and measures roughly 50 metres (160 ft) in length and 40 metres (130 ft) in width. The oval structure was initially of unclear function, but subsequent excavation confirmed it as an amphitheatre based on its layout, including the discovery of side entrances and a plastered arena wall.

A boathouse was planned for the site, and only the ruins of a Roman quarry were expected to be found. However, excavations led by Jakob Baerlocher of the Aargau Canton Archaeology Department, which began in December 2021, uncovered the amphitheatre instead. Parts of the gates, side entrances, preserved sandstone threshold, and interior walls with traces of plaster were revealed. The remains of the amphitheatre will be left in situ, and the boathouse will now be constructed above the site, featuring a glass viewing platform.

The amphitheatre is the second of its kind discovered in the canton of Aargau and the third associated with the Roman city of Augusta Raurica. It was built in a former Roman quarry near the Castrum Rauracense, which archaeological authorities describe as an important military and administrative site. The find adds to a broader archaeological landscape shared between the modern-day Swiss cantons of Aargau and Basel-Landschaft.
